= List of Marcel Breuer works =

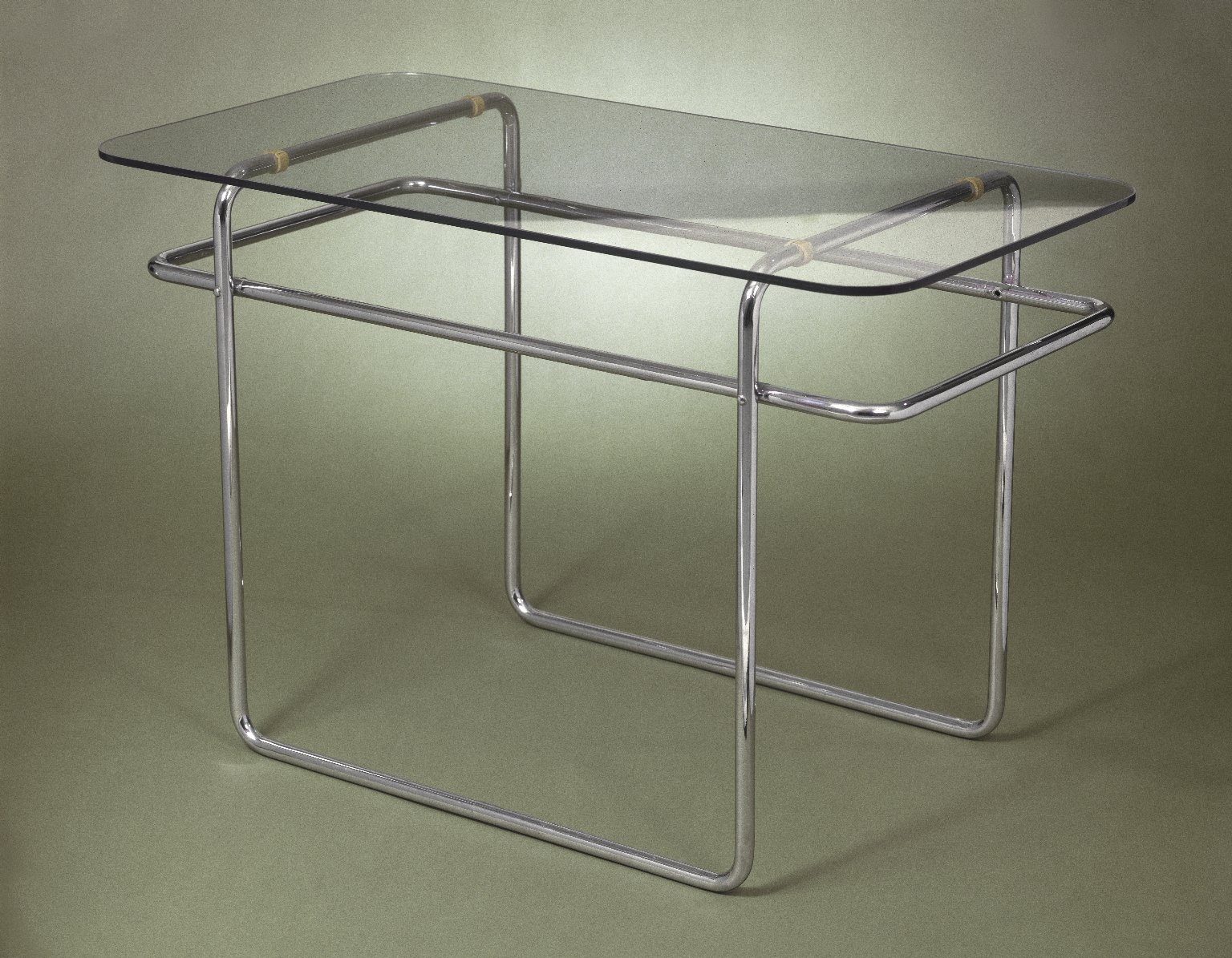
Marcel Breuer. Table, Model B19, ca. 1928 Brooklyn Museum

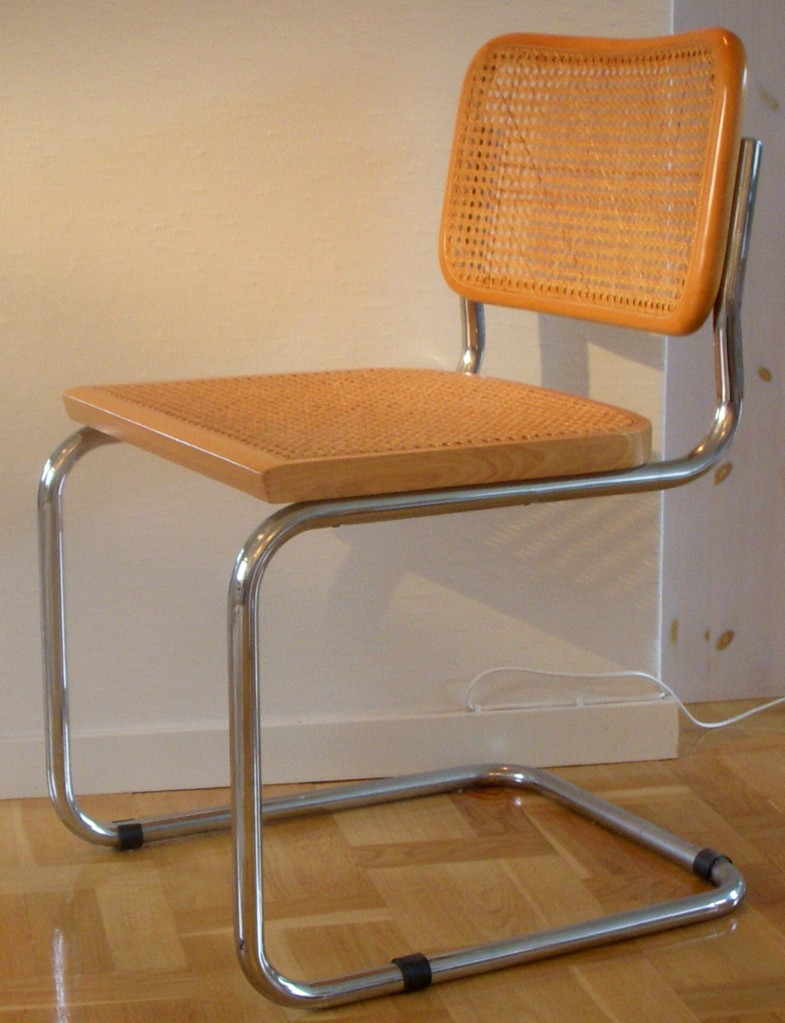
Cesca

This is a chronological list of houses, commercial buildings and other works by Marcel Breuer.

== Completed work ==
=== Structures ===
Completed	Name	Location/City	Country	Other architects	Notes
1926	Gropius, Moholy-Nagy, Kandinsky, and Muche Interiors	The Bauhaus – Dessau	Germany	Bauhaus	
1927	Piscator Apartment	Berlin	Germany	Independent practice	
1927	Weissenhof Siedlung – Gropius and Stam Apartment Interiors	Stuttgart	Germany	Independent practice	
1932	Harnischmacher House I	Wiesbaden	Germany	Independent practice	
1935	Spring Trade Fair Competition	Budapest	Hungary	Independent practice	
1936	Doldertal Apartments	Zurich	Switzerland	Alfred and Emil Roth	
1936	Gane's Exhibition Pavilion	Bristol	England	with F. R. S. Yorke	
1937	London Theatre Studio	London	England	with F. R. S. Yorke	
1937	Rose House (Shangri-La)	Lee-on-the-Solent	England	with F. R. S. Yorke	
1937	Macnabb House (Sea Lane House)	Angmering	England	with F. R. S. Yorke	
1938	Two Houses for Masters, Eton College	Buckinghamshire	England	with F. R. S. Yorke	
1936	Ventris Apartment in Highpoint	London	England	with F. R. S. Yorke	
1938	Gropius House	Lincoln, Massachusetts	United States	with Walter Gropius	
1938	Hagerty House	Cohasset, Massachusetts	United States	with Walter Gropius	
1939	Breuer House, Lincoln	Lincoln, Massachusetts	United States	with Walter Gropius	
1939	Ford House	Lincoln, Massachusetts	United States	with Walter Gropius	
1939	Alan I W Frank House	Pittsburgh, Pennsylvania	United States	with Walter Gropius	
1939	New York World's Fair Pennsylvania State Exhibition	Queens, New York	United States	with Walter Gropius	
1940	Chamberlain Cottage	Wayland, Massachusetts	United States	with Walter Gropius	
1941	Weizenblatt House	Asheville, North Carolina	United States	with Walter Gropius	
1941	Aluminum City Terrace	New Kensington, Pennsylvania	United States	with Walter Gropius	
1945	Geller House I	Lawrence, New York	United States		Demolished in 2022.
1946	Tompkins House	Hewlett Harbor, New York	United States		
1947	Breuer House, New Canaan I	New Canaan, Connecticut	United States	Cantilevered	
1947	Mills House	New Canaan, Connecticut	United States		
1947	Ariston Club	Mar del Plata	Argentina	with Eduardo Catalano	
1947	Robinson House	Williamstown, Massachusetts	United States		
1948	Kniffen House	New Canaan, Connecticut	United States	with Eliot Noyes	
1948	Scott House	Dennis, Massachusetts	United States		
1948	Thompson House	Ligonier, Pennsylvania	United States		
1949	Kepes Cottage	Wellfleet, Massachusetts	United States		
1949	Breuer Cottage	Wellfleet, Massachusetts	United States		
1949	Hooper House I	Baltimore, Maryland	United States		
1949	House in the Museum Garden, Museum of Modern Art (MoMA)	Manhattan, New York	United States		
1950	Tilley House	Red Bank, New Jersey	United States		based upon the MoMA House
1950	Lauck House	Princeton, New Jersey	United States		based upon the MoMA House
1950	Foote House	Chappaqua, New York	United States		based upon the MoMA House
1950	Marshad House	Croton-on-Hudson, New York	United States		
1950	Wolfson Trailer House	Pleasant Valley, New York	United States		
1950	Clark House	Orange, Connecticut	United States		
1950	Englund House	Pleasantville, New York	United States		
1950	Hanson House	Huntington, New York	United States		
1950	Stillman House I	Litchfield, Connecticut	United States		
1950	Peter and Karen McComb House	Poughkeepsie, New York	United States		
1950	Ferry Cooperative Dormitory at Vassar College	Poughkeepsie, New York	United States		
1951	Breuer House, New Canaan II	New Canaan, Connecticut	United States		Rubble stone
1951	Pack House	Scarsdale, New York	United States		
1951	Witalis House	Kings Point, New York	United States		
1951	Sarah Lawrence College Arts Center	Bronxville, New York	United States		
1951	Grosse Pointe Public Library	Grosse Pointe, Michigan	United States		
1951	Abraham & Straus Exterior Façade	Hempstead, New York	United States		
1952	Caesar Cottage	Lakeville, Connecticut	United States		
1952	Levy House	Princeton, New Jersey	United States		
1953	Northfield Elementary School	Litchfield, Connecticut	United States	with O'Connor & Kilham	
1953	Saint John's Abbey and University Master Plan	Collegeville, Minnesota	United States	with Hamilton Smith	
1953	Torin Corp Manufacturing Plant	Oakville, Ontario	Canada		
1953	Edgar Stillman Cottage	Wellfleet, Massachusetts	United States		
1954	Crall House	Gates Mills, Ohio	United States		
1954	Neumann House	Croton-on-Hudson, New York	United States		
1954	Snower House	Kansas City, Kansas	United States	with Robert Gatje	
1954	Grieco House	Andover, Massachusetts	United States		
1954	O E McIntyre, Inc Manufacturing Plant	Westbury, New York	United States	with William Landsberg	
1954	Starkey House	Duluth, Minnesota	United States	with Herbert Beckhard and Robert Gatje	
1954	Gagarin House I	Litchfield, Connecticut	United States	with Herbert Beckhard	
1955	Connecticut Junior Republic	Litchfield, Connecticut	United States	with Herbert Beckhard	
1955	Saint John's Abbey Monastery Wing	Collegeville, Minnesota	United States	with Hamilton Smith	
1956	Torin Corp Manufacturing Plant	Van Nuys, California	United States	Supervising architect: Craig Ellwood	
1956	Bantam Elementary School	Bantam, Connecticut	United States	with O’Connor & Kilham	
1956	Litchfield High School (Litchfield, Connecticut)	Litchfield, Connecticut	United States	with O’Connor & Kilham	
1956	Karsten House	Owings Mills, Maryland	United States		
1957	Laaff House	Andover, Massachusetts	United States	with Herbert Beckhard	
1957	De Bijenkorf Department Store	Rotterdam	The Netherlands	Associated architect: nl:Abraham Elzas	
1957	Members' Housing at the Institute for Advanced Study	Princeton, New Jersey	United States	with Robert Gatje	
1958	UNESCO Headquarters	Paris	France	with Pier Luigi Nervi and Bernard Zehrfuss	
1958	United States Embassy	The Hague	The Netherlands		
1958	Van Leer Office Building	Amstelveen	The Netherlands		
1958	Staehelin House	Feldmeilen	Switzerland	with Herbert Beckhard	
1958	Krieger House	Bethesda, Maryland	United States		
1959	Westchester Reform Temple	Scarsdale, New York	United States	with William Landsberg	
1959	Hooper House II	Baltimore, Maryland	United States	with Herbert Beckhard	
1959	Saint John's University St. Thomas Aquinas Hall	Collegeville, Minnesota	United States	with Hamilton Smith	
1959	Annunciation Priory Convent	Bismarck, North Dakota	United States	with Hamilton Smith	
1960	Library and Administration Building at Hunter College (now Lehman College)	The Bronx, New York	United States	with Robert Gatje	
1960	McMullen Beach House	Mantoloking, New Jersey	United States	with Herbert Beckhard	
1960	Resort Town Flaine Master Plan	Haute-Savoie	France	with Herbert Beckhard	
1961	Saint John's Abbey Church and Bell Banner	Collegeville, Minnesota	United States	with Hamilton Smith	
1961	New York University (now Bronx Community College) Dormitory and Student Center	The Bronx, New York	United States	with Robert Gatje	
1961 & 1970	New York University (now Bronx Community College) Technology Buildings; five structures including Begrisch Hall	The Bronx, New York	United States	with Hamilton Smith	
1961	IBM La Gaude Research Center	La Gaude	France	with Robert Gatje	
1961	Kacmarcik House	St. Paul, Minnesota	United States		
1963	Wise Cottage	Wellfleet, Massachusetts	United States		
1963	Torin Corp Machine Division	Torrington, Connecticut	United States	with Robert Gatje	
1964	Torin Corp Manufacturing Plant	Nivelles	Belgium	with Hamilton Smith	
1965	Rufus Stillman House II	Litchfield, Connecticut	United States	with Herbert Beckhard	
1966	Torin Corp Administration Building	Torrington, Connecticut	United States	with Herbert Beckhard	
1966	Torin Corp Manufacturing Plant	Swindon	England	with Robert Gatje	
1966	Saint John's University Alcuin Library	Collegeville, Minnesota	United States	Hamilton Smith	
1966	Saint John's University Peter Engel Science Building	Collegeville, Minnesota	United States	with Hamilton Smith	
1967	Saint John's University St. Patrick, St. Boniface, St. Bernard Halls	Collegeville, Minnesota	United States	with Hamilton Smith	
1968	Saint John's University Ecumenical Institute	Collegeville, Minnesota	United States	with Robert Gatje	
1968	Annunciation Priory, Mary College	Bismarck, North Dakota	United States	with Tician Papachristou	
1968	Torin Corp Manufacturing Plant	Rochester, Indiana	United States	with Robert Gatje	
since 1968	IBM France Extensions	La Gaude	France	with Robert Gatje and Mario Jossa	
since 1969	Over fifty buildings at Resort Town Flaine	Flaine	France	with Robert Gatje and Mario Jossa	
1969	Geller House II	Lawrence, New York	United States	with Herbert Beckhard	
1971	Torin Corp Technical Center	Torrington, Connecticut	United States	with Herbert Beckhard	
1974	Rufus Stillman House III	Litchfield, Connecticut	United States	with Tician Papachristou	
1963	Fairview Heights Apartments	Ithaca, New York	United States	with Hamilton Smith	
1966	Koerfer House	Moscia (Tessin)	Switzerland	with Herbert Beckhard	
1966	The Whitney Museum of American Art third location	Manhattan, New York	United States	with Hamilton Smith	
1966	St. Francis de Sales Church	Muskegon, Michigan	United States	with Herbert Beckhard	
1966	ZUP de Bayonne Master Plan & Apartments	Bayonne	France	with Robert Gatje	
1967	Laboratoires Sarget-Ambrine Headquarters	Merignac	France	with Robert Gatje	
1968	Department of HUD Headquarters	Washington, D.C.	United States	with Herbert Beckhard	
1968	IBM Master Plan and Manufacturing Center	Boca Raton, Florida	United States	with Robert Gatje	
1968	Project for Grand Central Tower	Manhattan, New York	United States	with Herbert Beckhard	
1969	Soriano House	Greenwich, Connecticut	United States	with Tician Papachristou	
1970	IBM Boca Extensions	Boca Raton, Florida	United States	with Robert Gatje	
1970	University of Massachusetts Amherst Campus Center	Amherst, Massachusetts	United States	with Herbert Beckhard	
1970	Yale University Becton Laboratory Building	New Haven, Connecticut	United States	with Hamilton Smith	
1970	Cleveland Museum of Art Education Wing	Cleveland, Ohio	United States	with Hamilton Smith	
1970	Armstrong Rubber Company Headquarters	New Haven, Connecticut	United States	with Robert Gatje	
1970	Baldegg Convent "Mother House"	Lucerne	Switzerland	with Robert Gatje	
1971	Cleveland Trust Company Headquarters	Cleveland, Ohio	United States	with Hamilton Smith	
1971	Bryn Mawr School for Girls Lower and Elementary	Baltimore, Maryland	United States	with Hamilton Smith	
1973	Sayer House	Glanville	France	with Mario Jossa and Robert Gatje	
1974	American Press Institute Conference Center	Reston, Virginia	United States	with Hamilton Smith	
1974	SNET Telephone Systems Building	Torrington, Connecticut	United States	with Hamilton Smith	
1975	Grand Coulee Dam Third Power Plant	Grand Coulee, Washington	United States	with Hamilton Smith	
1976	Torin Corp Manufacturing Plant	Penrith, New South Wales	Australia	with Harry Seidler and Bruce Rickard	
1978	Grand Coulee Dam Visitors Arrival Center	Grant and Okanogan counties, Washington	United States	with Hamilton Smith	
1975	Mundipharma Hqs and Mfg Bldg	Limburg	Germany	with Robert Gatje	
1975	Clarksburg Harrison Public Library	Clarksburg, West Virginia	United States	with Hamilton Smith	
1976	Department of HEW Headquarters	Washington, D.C.	United States	with Herbert Beckhard	
1977	SUNY@ Buffalo Furnas Hall School of Engineering and Applied Sciences	Amherst, New York	United States	with Robert Gatje	
1977	Madison Park High School	Boston, Massachusetts	United States		
1979	Strom Thurmond Federal Building and United States Courthouse	Columbia, South Carolina	United States	with James C. Hemphill, Jr.	
1980	Atlanta Central Public Library	Atlanta, Georgia	United States	with Hamilton Smith	

=== Furniture ===
Completed	Name	Other architects	Notes
1921	The African chair with Gunta Stölzl	Bauhaus	Completed while still a student
1923	Furniture and built-in cabinetry for the Haus am Horn, Weimar	Bauhaus	Completed while still a student
1925	First all-tubular steel chair (the Wassily)	Independent practice	
1925	Stool / Side Table of tubular steel (leading to cantilevered chair)	Independent practice	
1928	First cantilevered steel chair (the Cesca)	Independent practice	
1929	Model B 55 cantilevered steel chair	Independent practice	
1935	Plywood Tables and Stacking Chairs	Isokon furniture company	
1936	Reclining Plywood Chairs	Isokon furniture company	

== Other works ==
- 1931 Berlin Building Exhibition – "Haus fur ein Sportsmann" – Berlin, Germany
- 1954 Harnischmacher House II – Wiesbaden, Germany
- 1932 Wohnbedarf Furniture Stores – Basel and Zurich, Switzerland – for Sigfried Giedion
- 1935 Doldertal Apartments – Zurich, Switzerland – with A and E Roth for Sigfried Giedion
- 1936 Model for the "Civic Center of the Future" FRS Yorke
- 1968 Project for Grand Central Tower, New York (unbuilt)

== Gallery ==
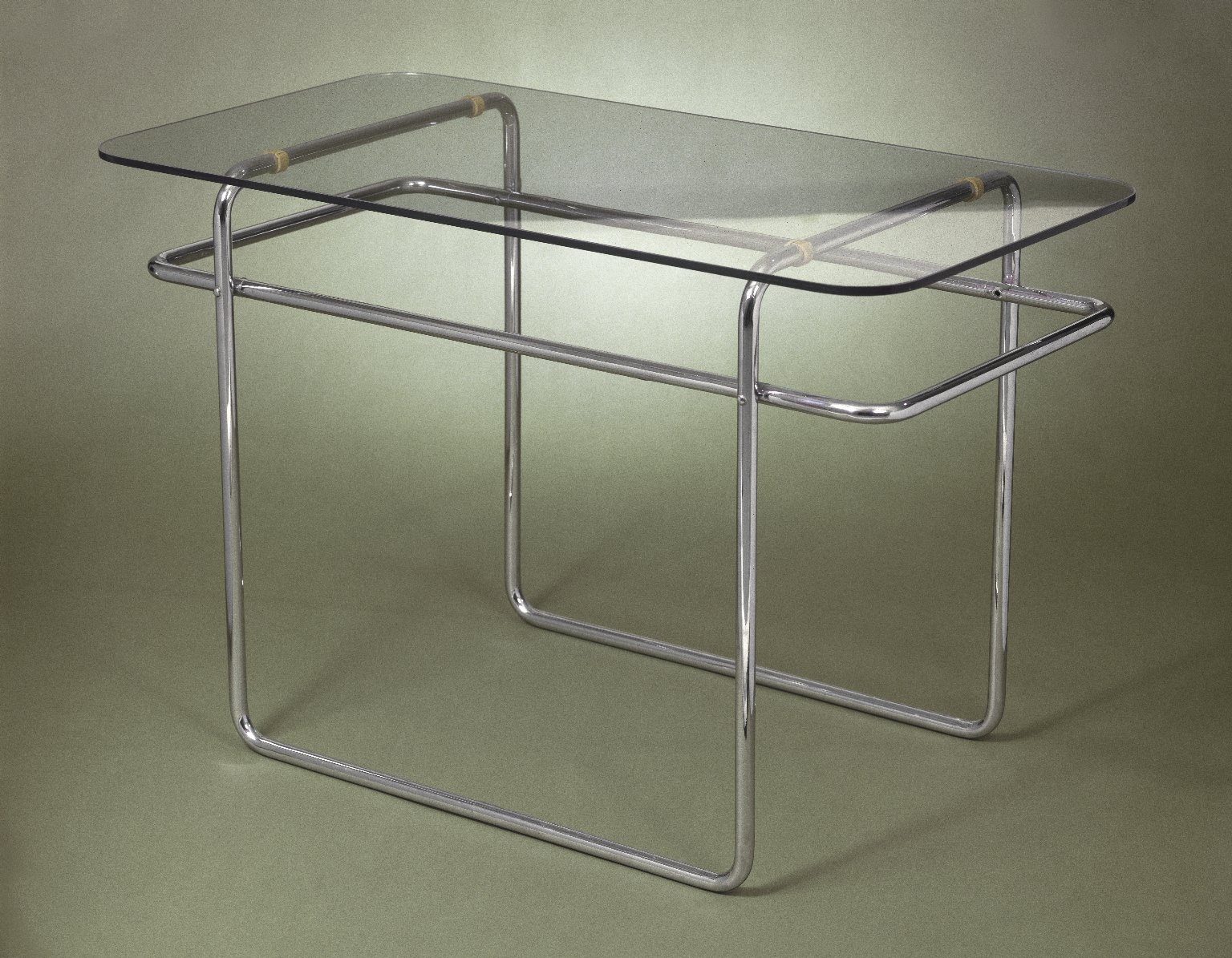
Marcel Breuer. Table, Model B19, ca. 1928 Brooklyn Museum

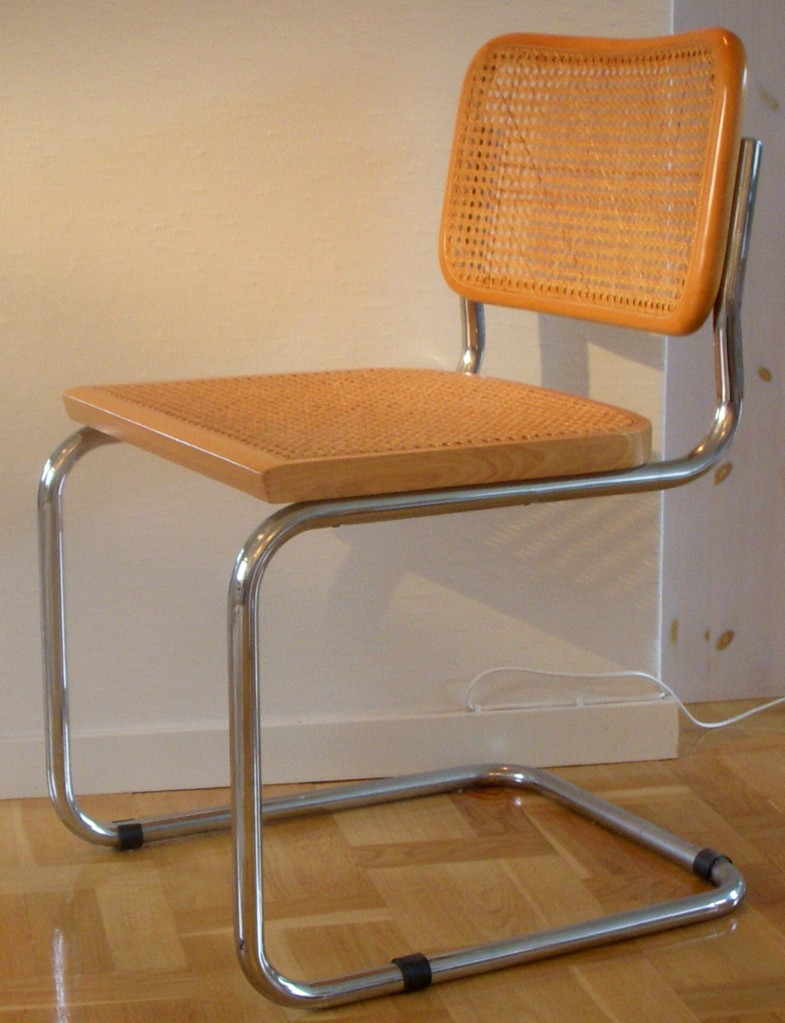
Cesca chair

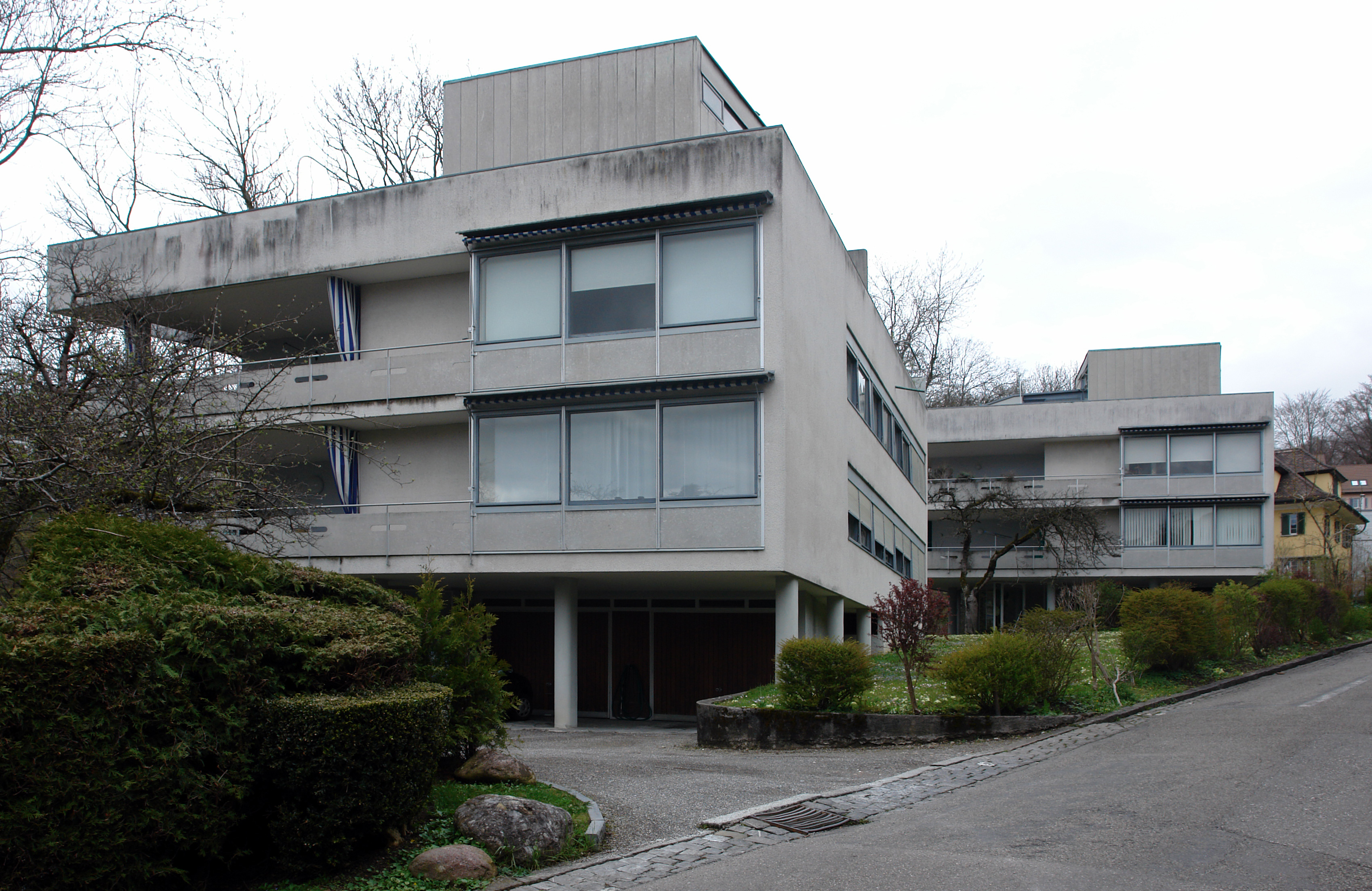
Doldertal Apartments (1935)

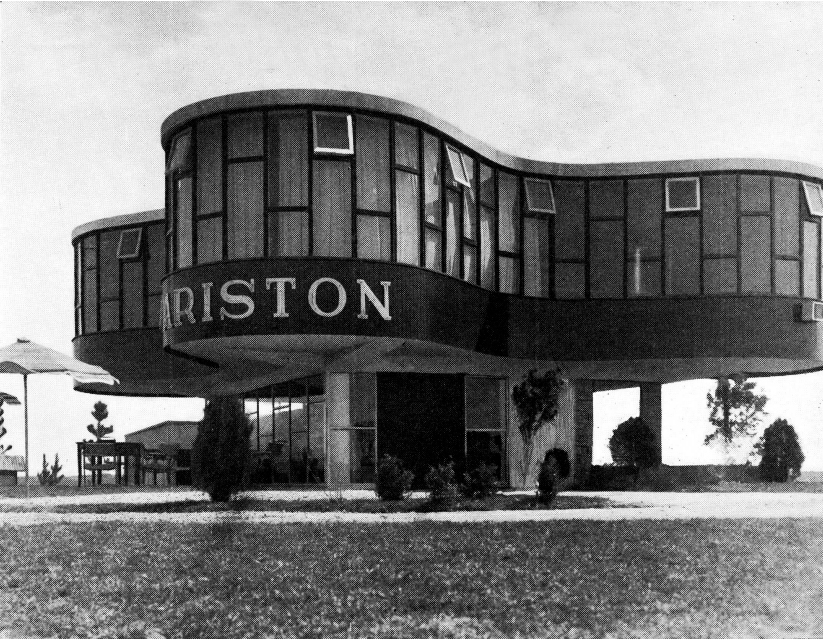
Ariston Club (1948) – Mar del Plata, Argentina

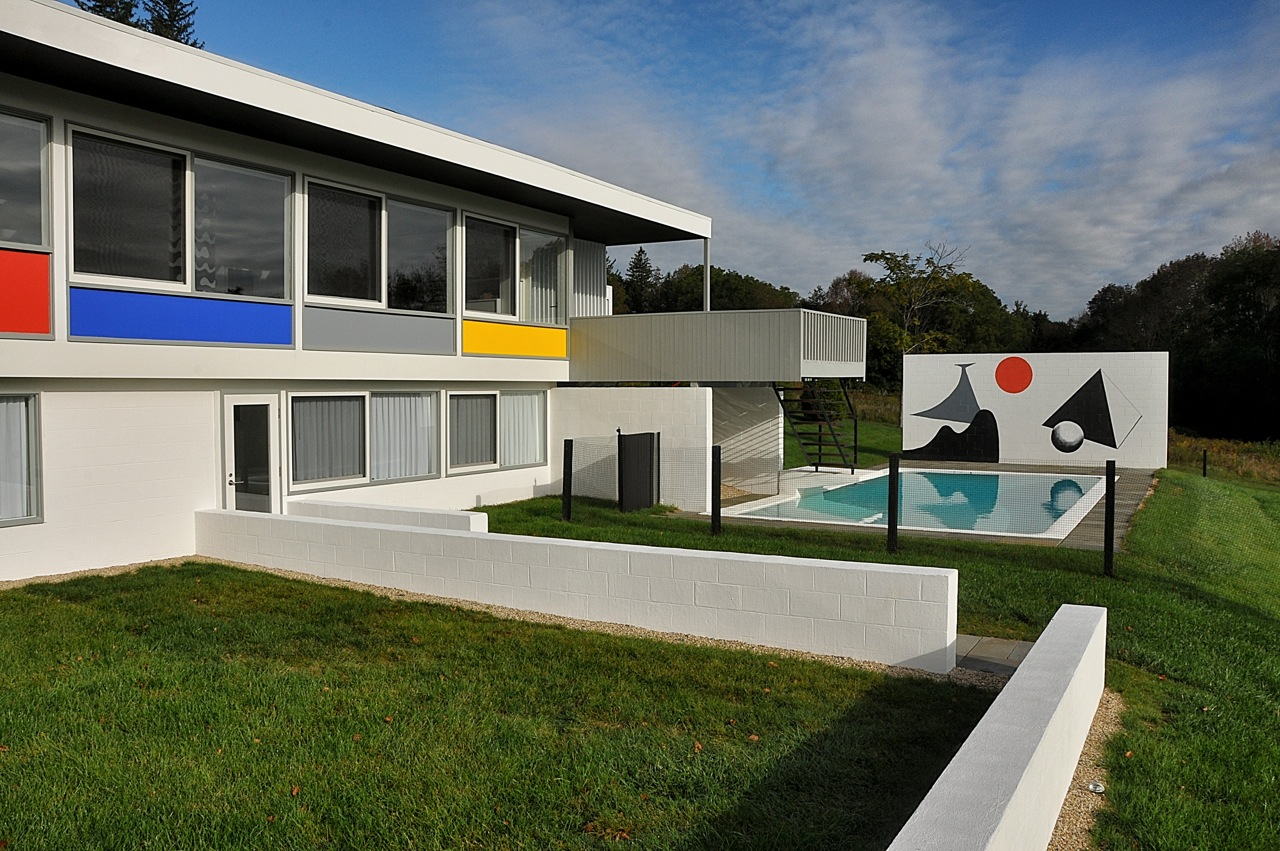
Rufus Stillman House I, Litchfield, Connecticut (1950)

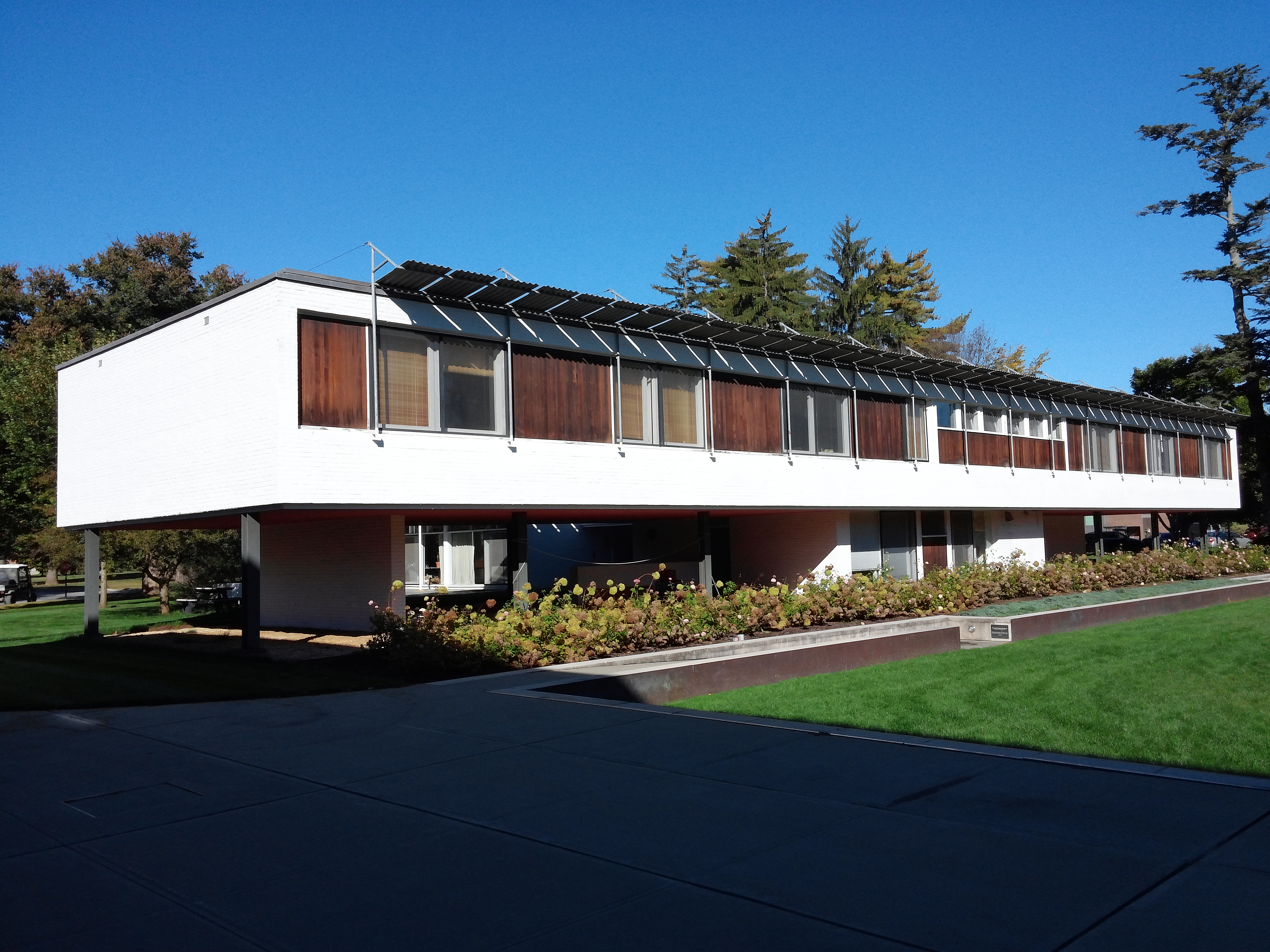
Dexter M. Ferry Cooperative House, Vassar College (1950)

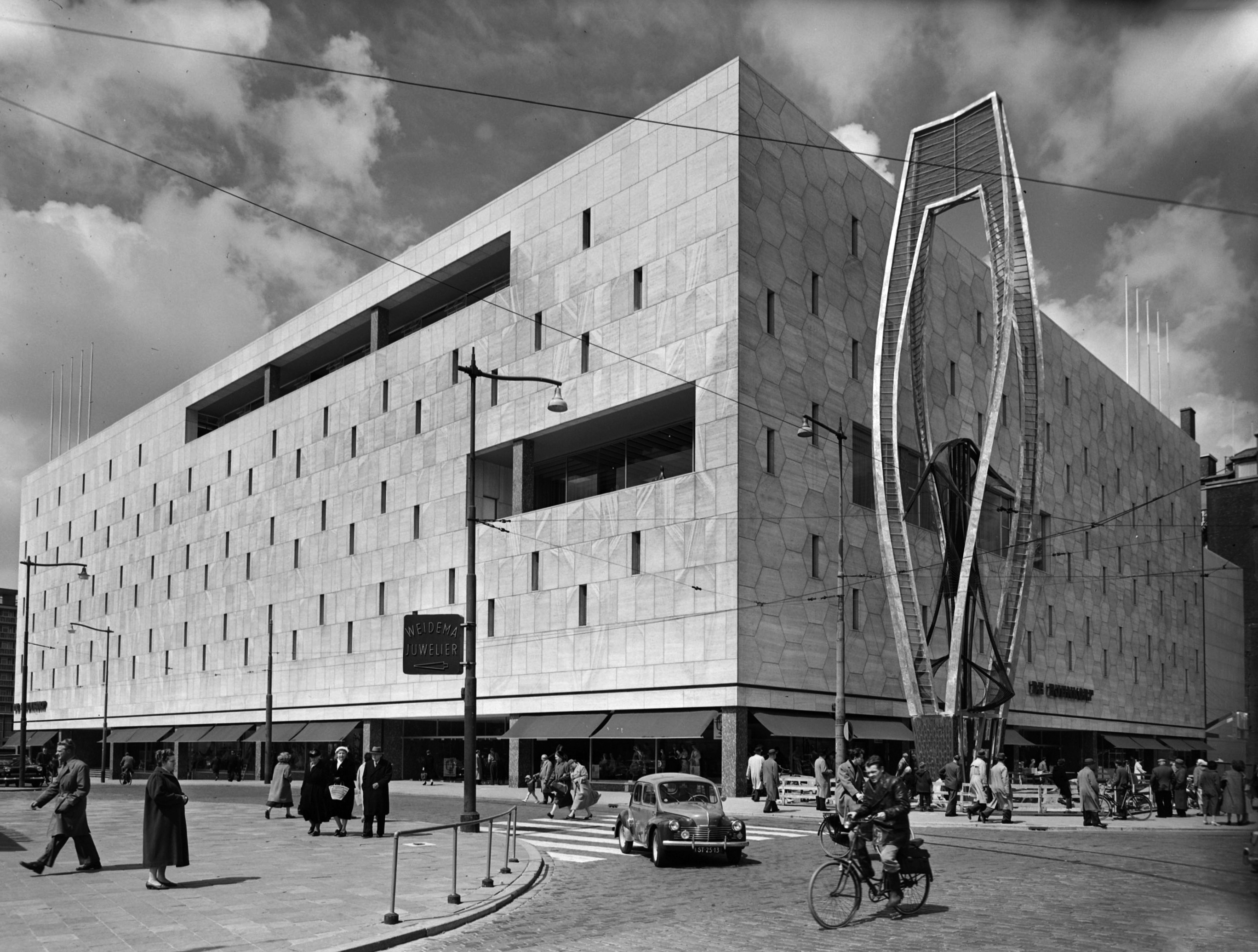
1957 new building Bijenkorf store in Rotterdam in cooperation with Abraham Elzas. On the right a sculpture by Naum Gabo

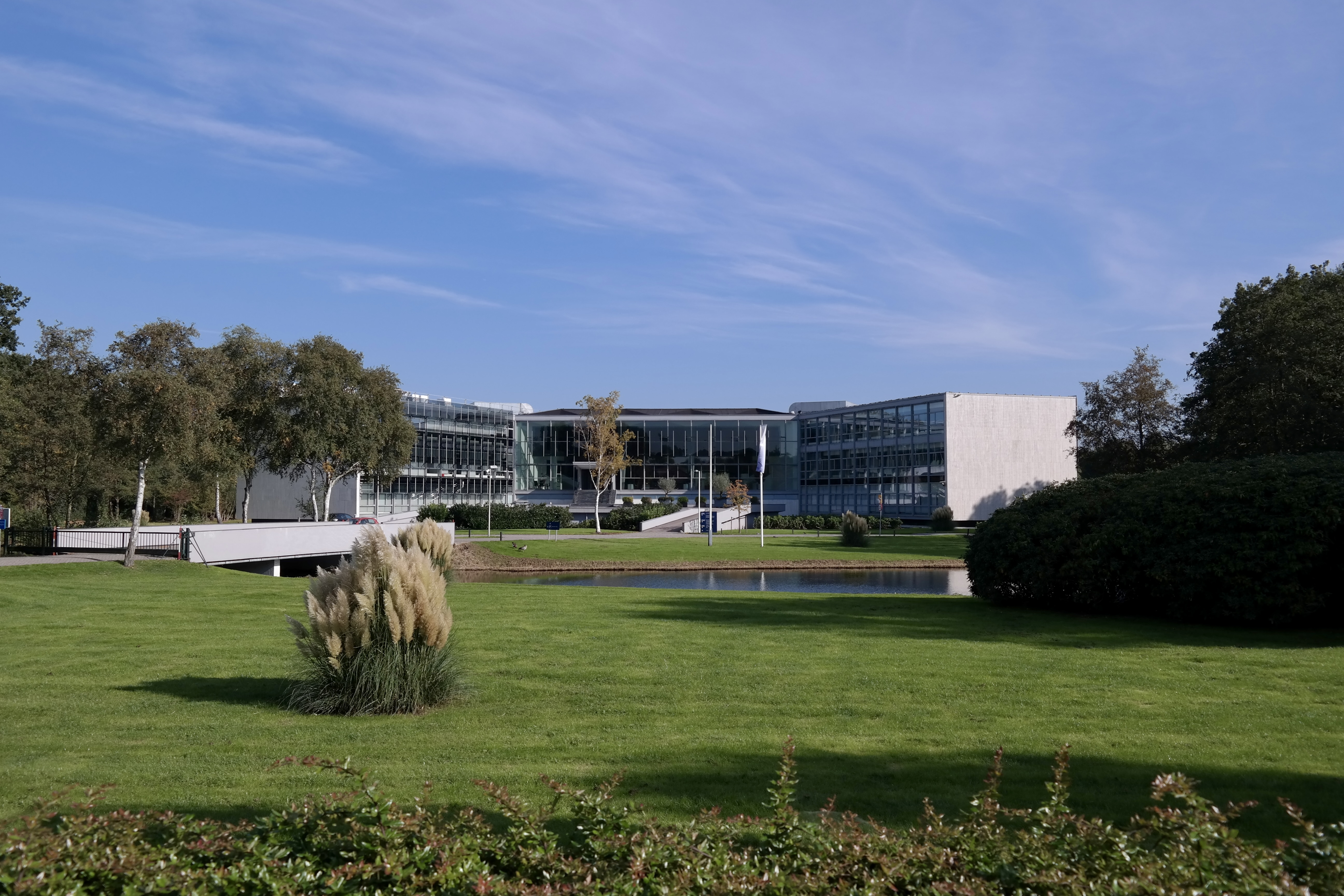
Van Leer's Office building, Amstelveen, The Netherlands (1958)

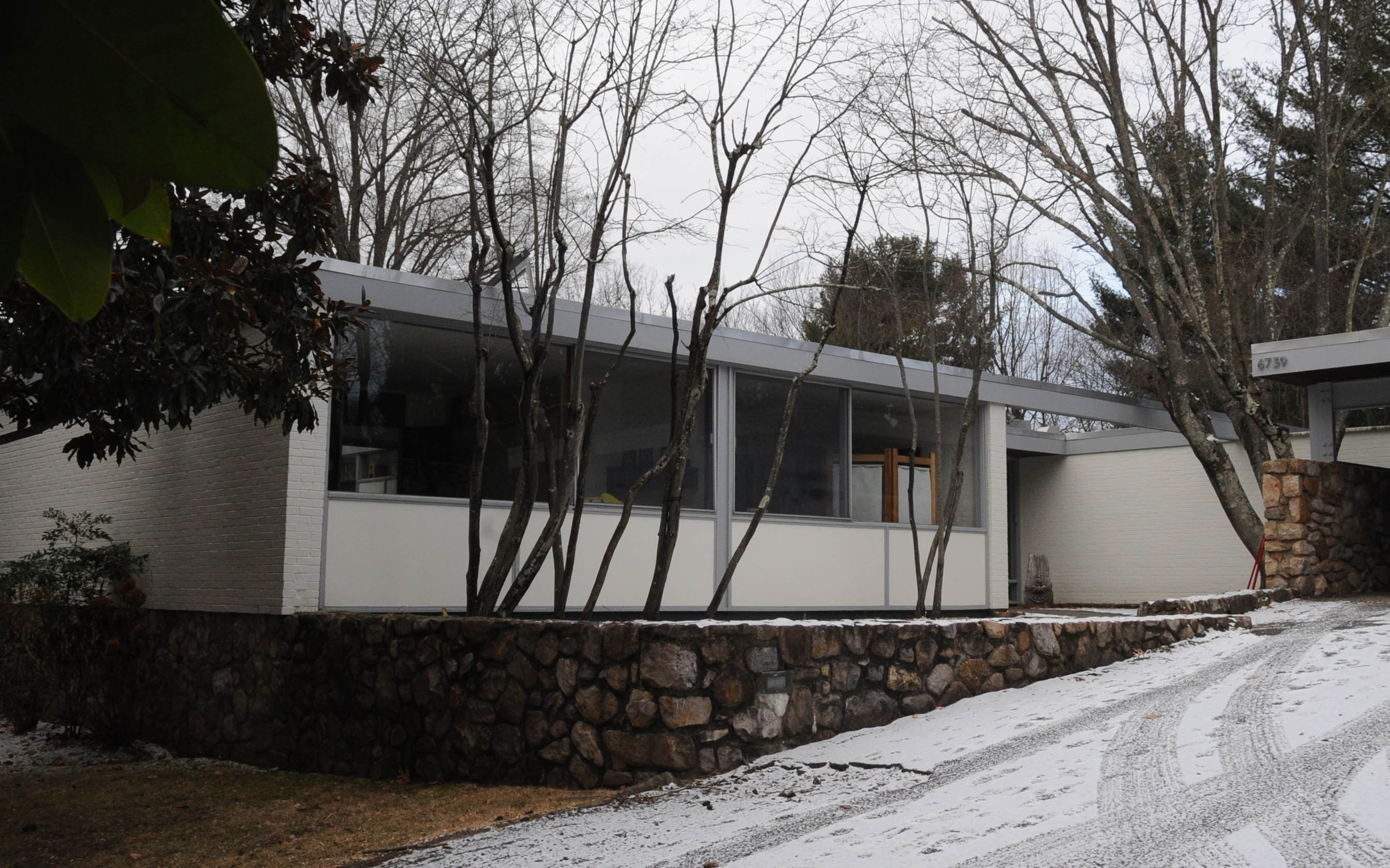
Seymour Krieger House, Bethesda, Maryland (1958)

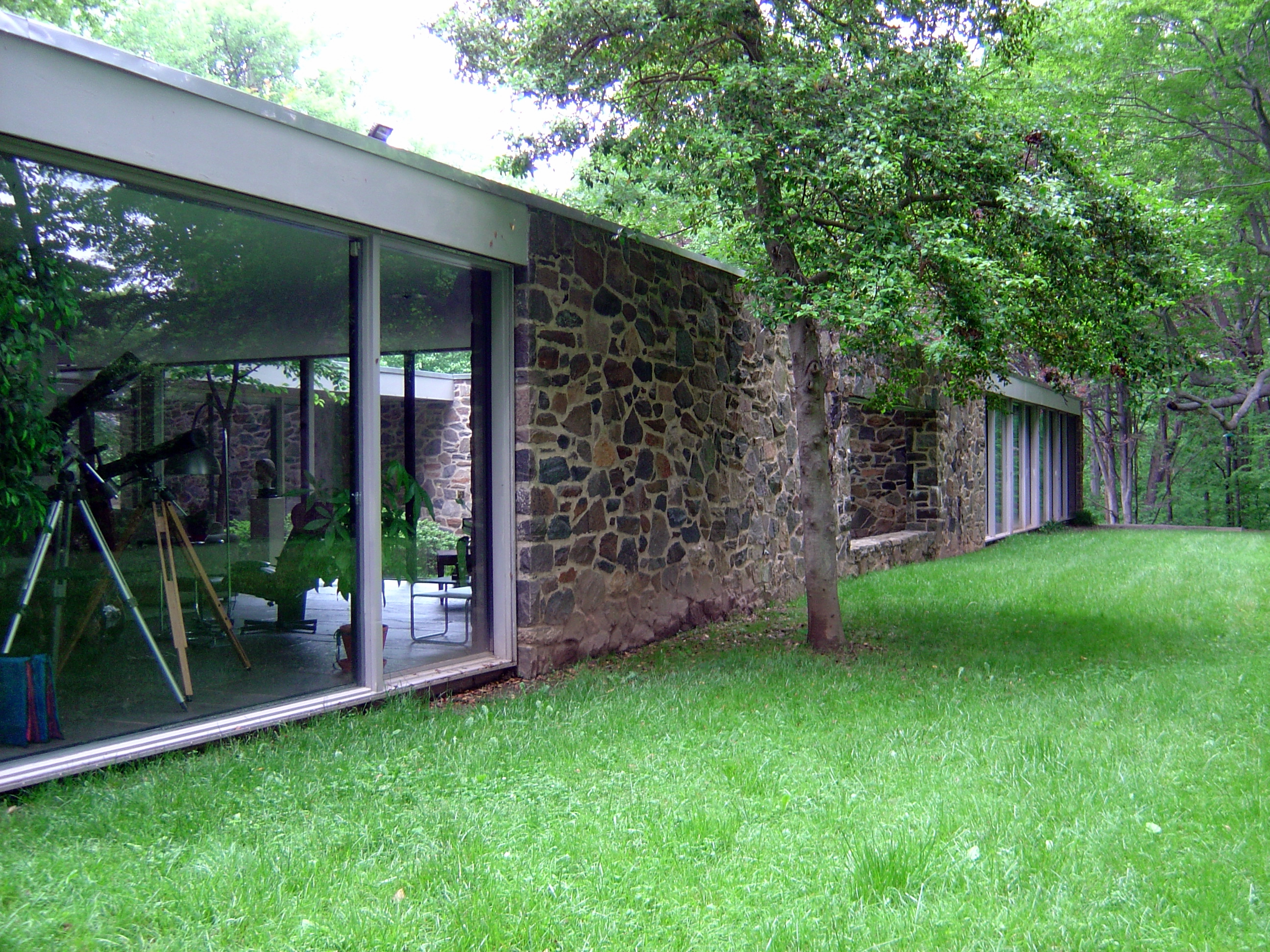
Hooper House II, Baltimore County, Maryland (1959)

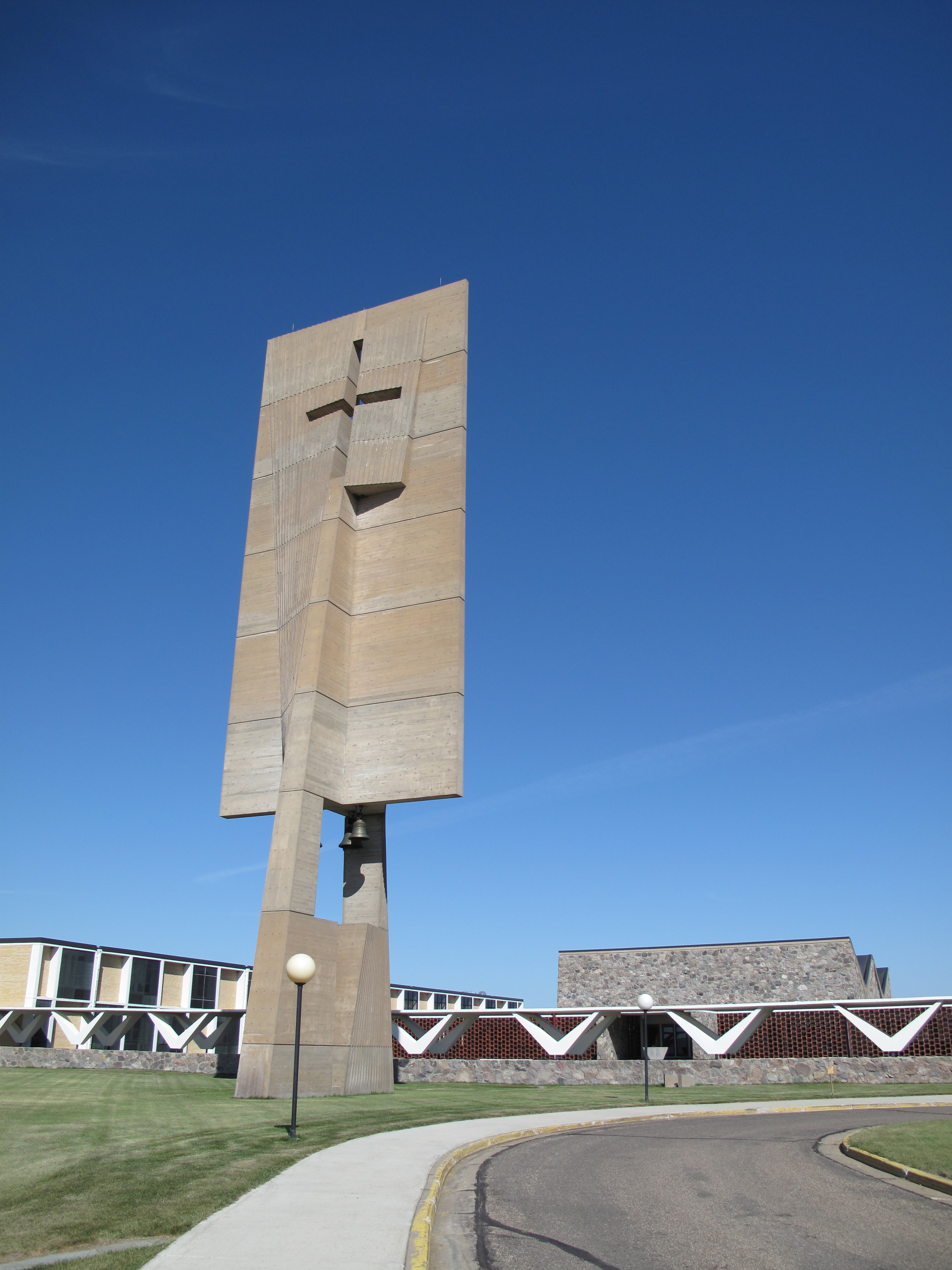
Mary College University of Mary (1960)

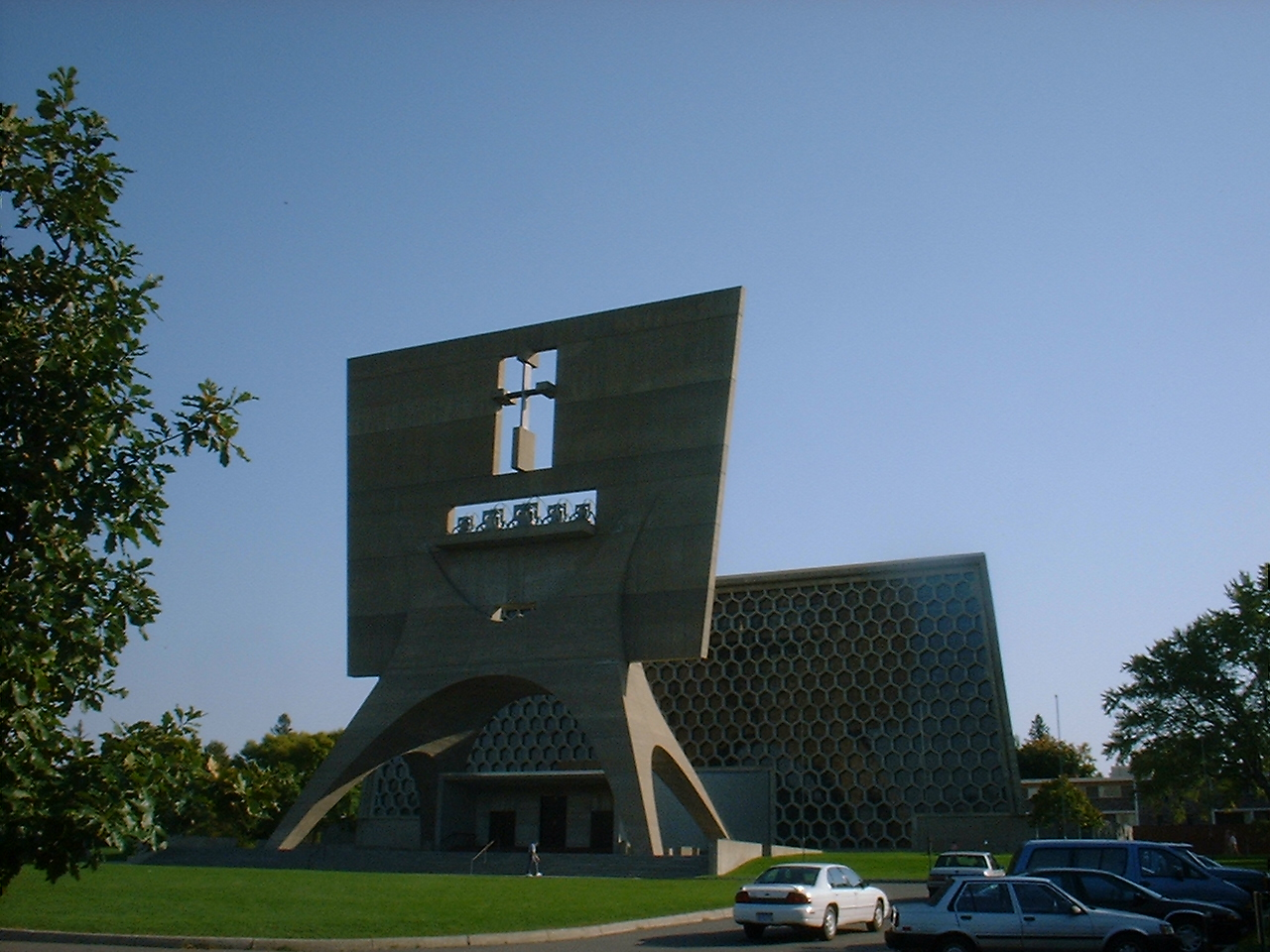
St. John's Abbey Church at the campus of Saint John's University, 1961

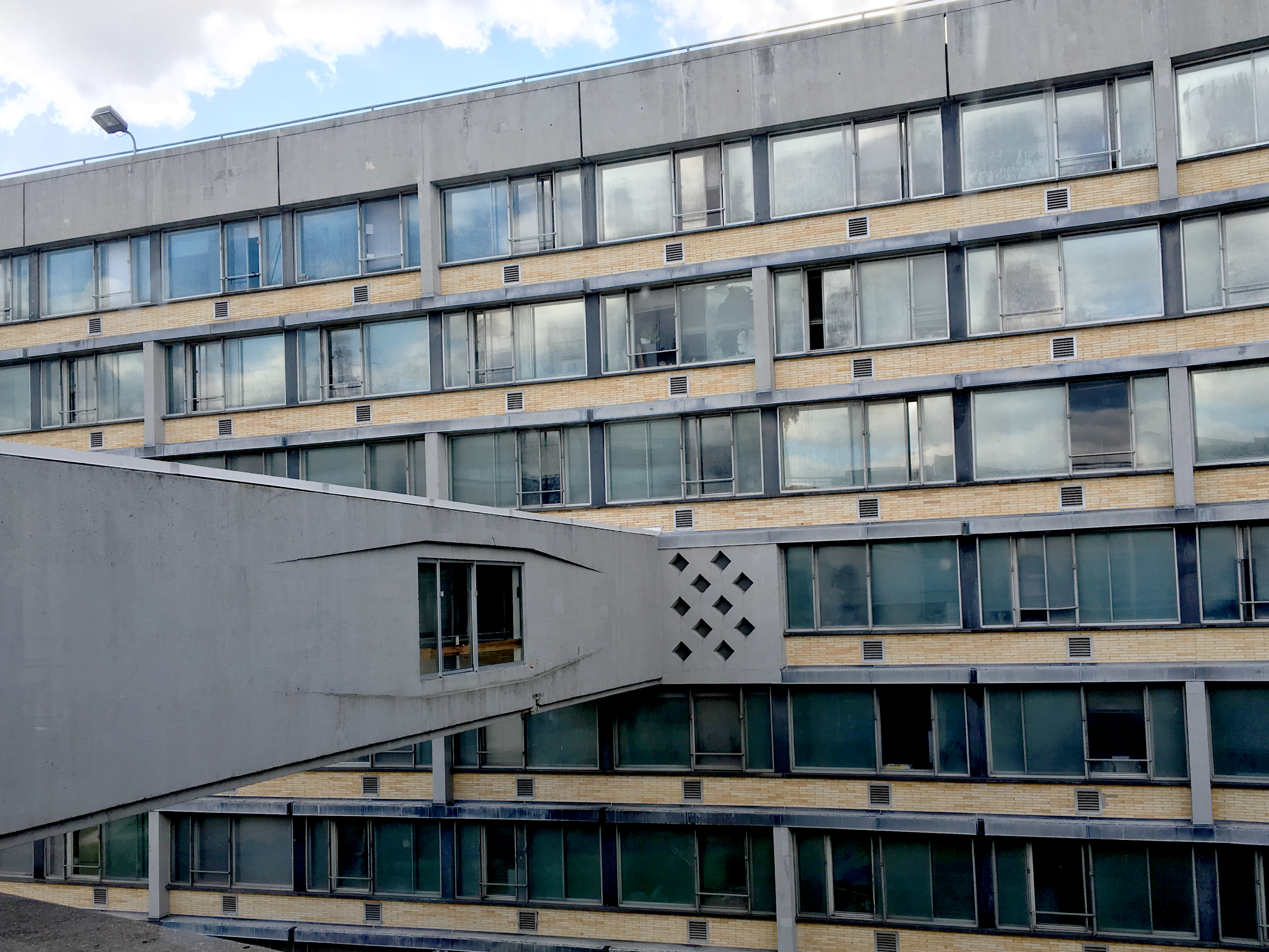
Colston Hall, Bronx Community College (1961) Originally a New York University campus.

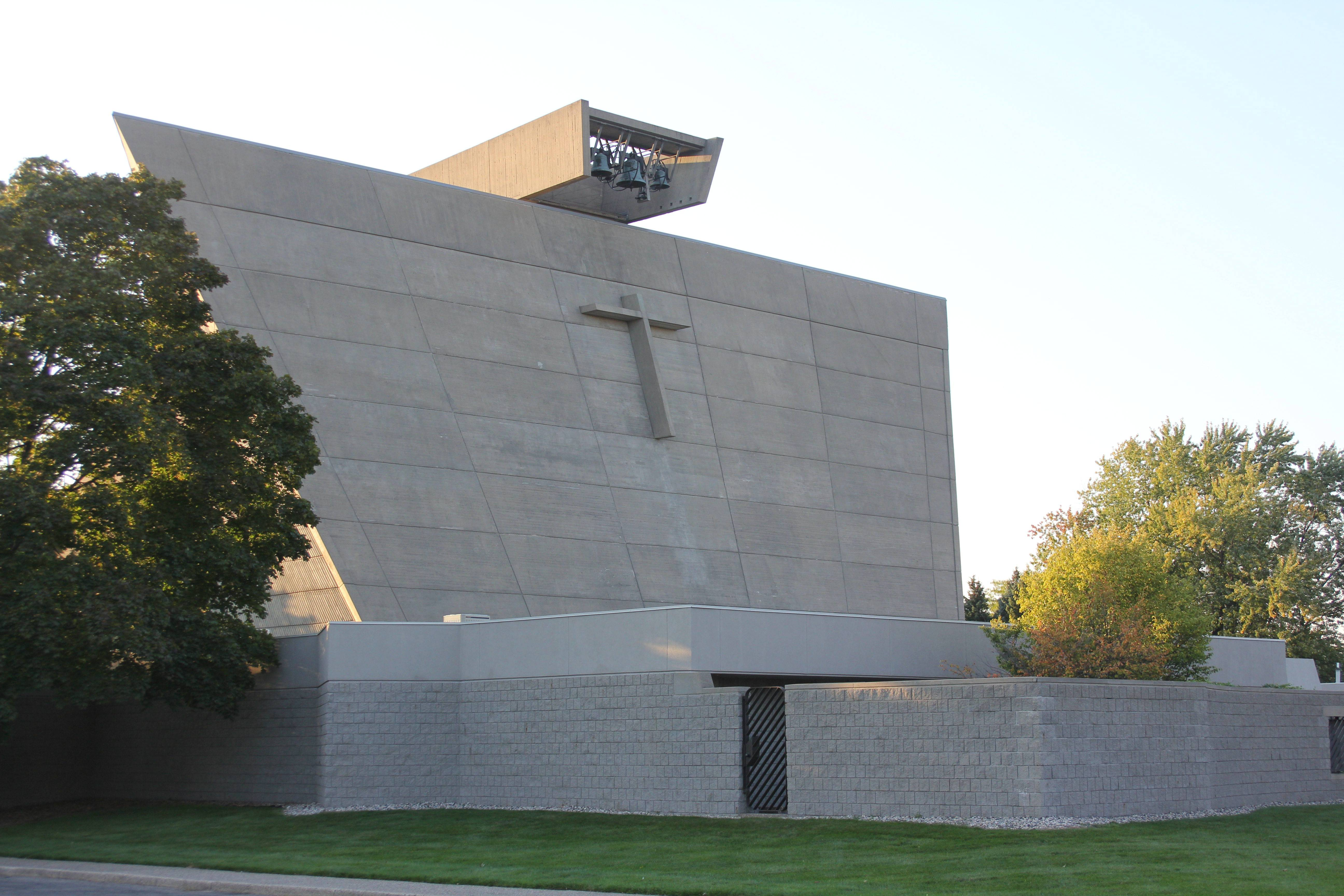
St. Francis De Sales Catholic Church, Muskegon, Michigan (1966)

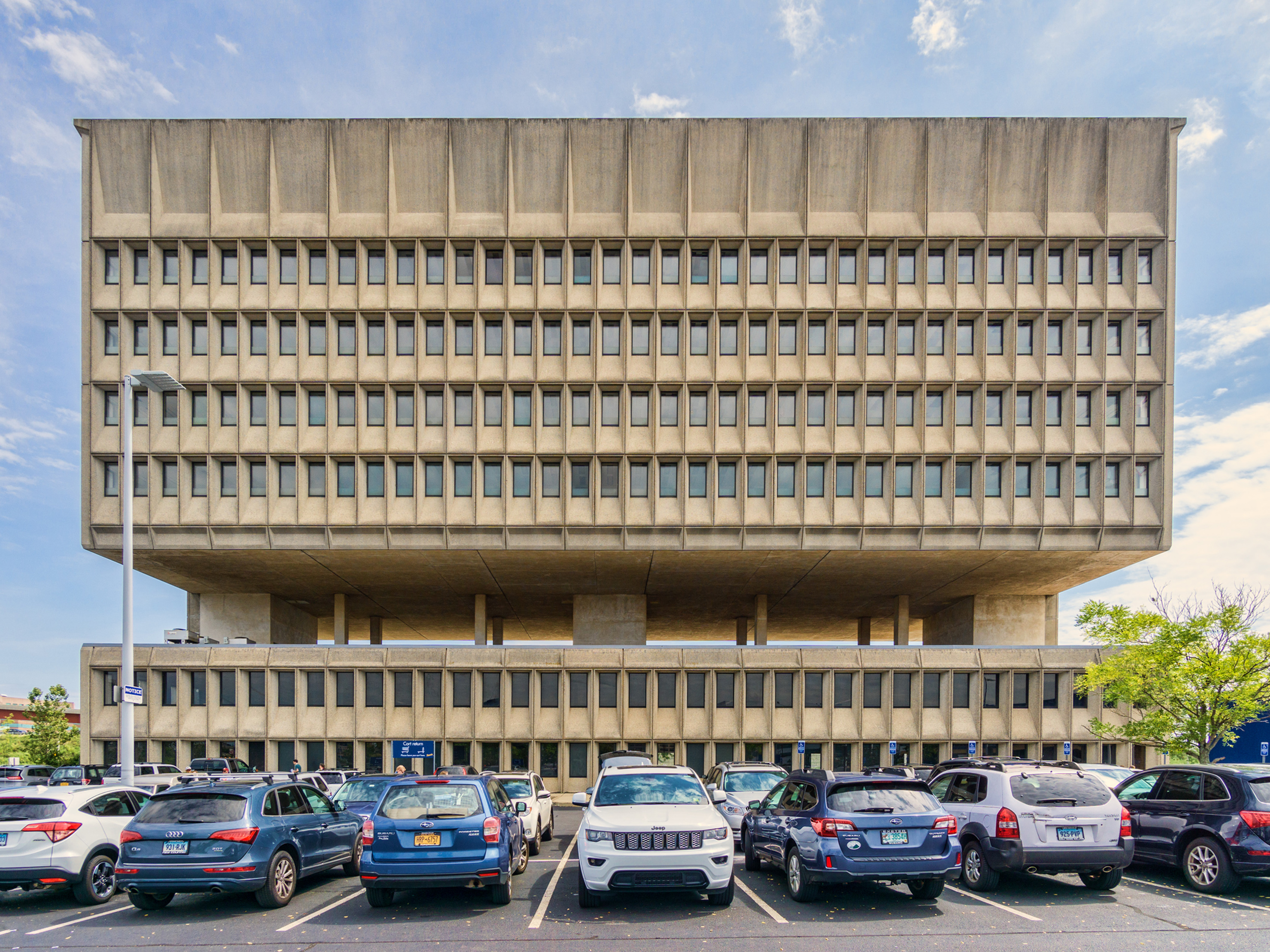
Armstrong Rubber Company Building (1970)

Clarksburg-Harrison Public Library in Clarksburg, West Virginia (1975)

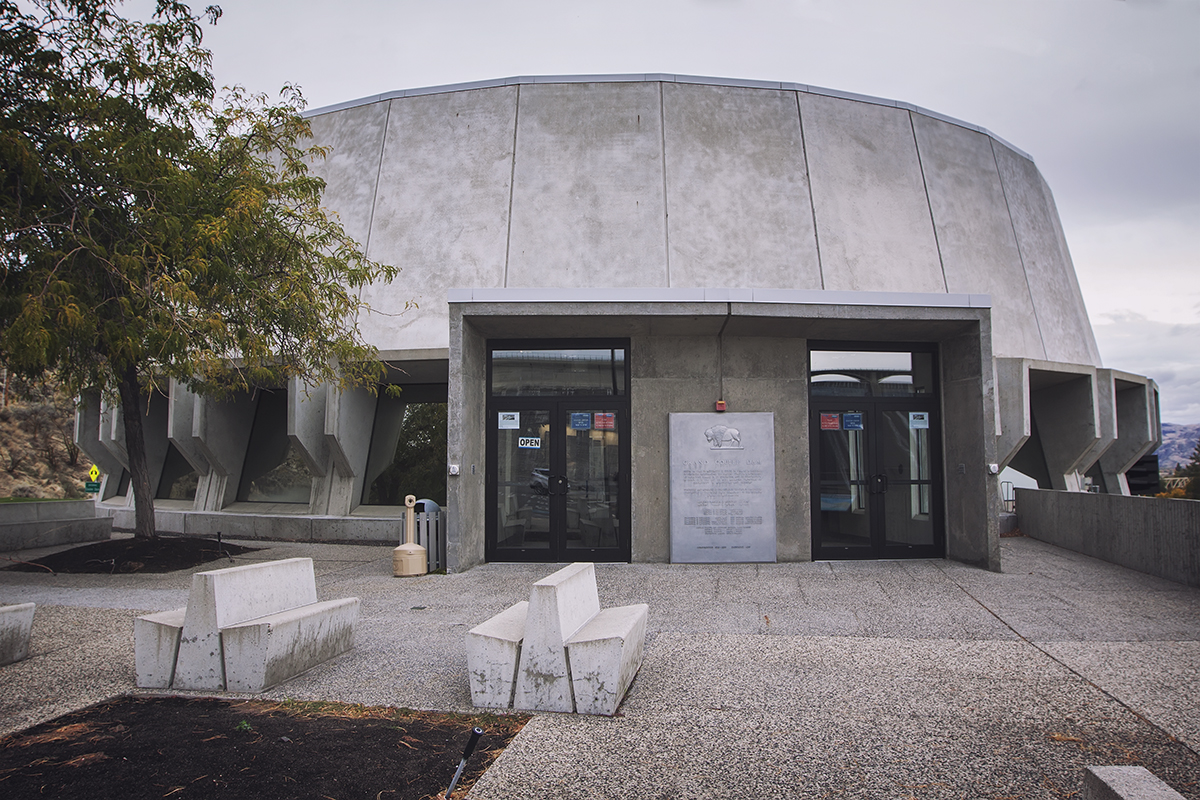
Grand Coulee Dam Visitors Arrival Center (1978)

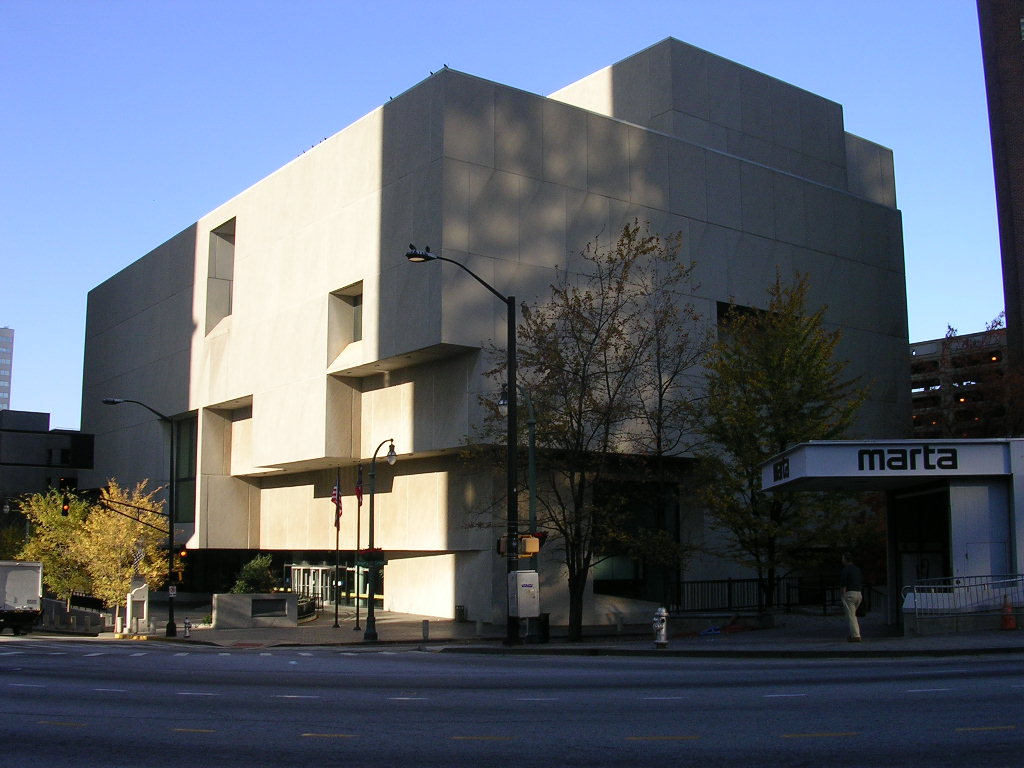
Atlanta Central Library, 1980

== Sources ==
- Hyman, Isabelle (2001). Marcel Breuer, Architect: The Career and the Buildings. Harry N. Abrams. ISBN 978-0-8109-4265-3.
- McCarter, Robert (2024). Breuer. Phaidon. ISBN 978-1-83866-947-8.
