= Peter and Karen McComb House =

Historic house in Poughkeepsie, New York

- U.S. National Register of Historic Places
- Location within New York Location within the United States
- Location: 27 Hornbeck Ridge, Poughkeepsie, New York
- Coordinates: 41°40′9″N 73°53′18″W
- Area: 3.3 acres (1.3 ha)
- Built: 1950-1951
- Architect: Breuer, Marcel
- Architectural style: International Style
- NRHP reference No.: 08000098
- Added to NRHP: August 12, 2009

Peter and Karen McComb House is a historic home located in Poughkeepsie, Dutchess County, New York. It was designed by architect Marcel Breuer and constructed between 1950 and 1951. The original section is a small, one- to two-story, T-shaped frame dwelling built in the International style, featuring a concrete foundation. Three additions were constructed in 1962, 1988, and 1994. The house is built into its site atop a steep rock ridge and features large-scale rectangular window panels.

It was added to the National Register of Historic Places in 2009.

== See also ==
- National Register of Historic Places listings in Poughkeepsie, New York
- List of Marcel Breuer works
