= St. Francis de Sales Church (Norton Shores, Michigan) =

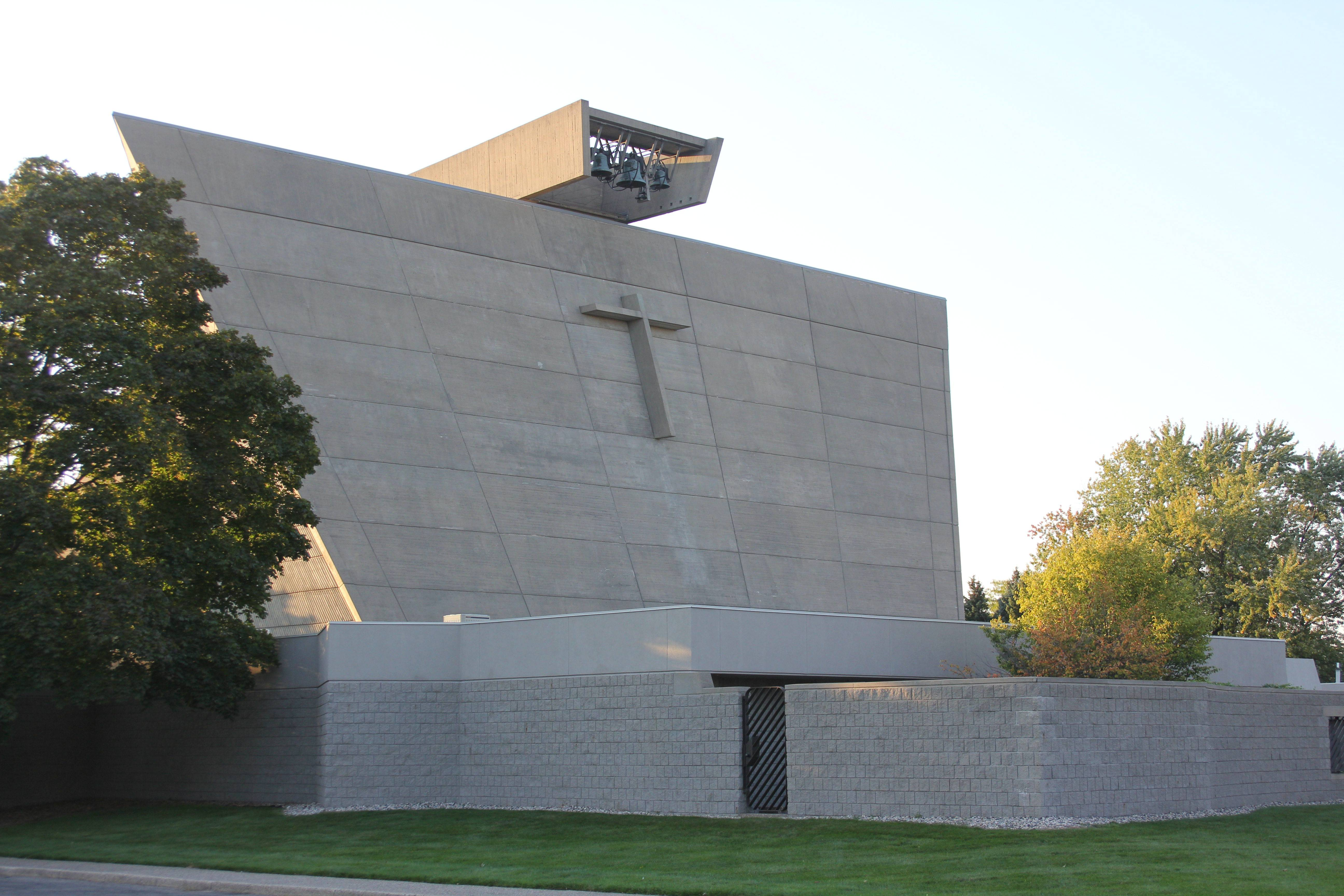
- St. Francis de Sales Church
- 43.1998°N 86.2946°W
- Location: 2929 McCracken St Norton Shores, Michigan
- Denomination: Roman Catholic

History
- Founded: 1948

Architecture
- Architect: Marcel Breuer
- Years built: 1950, 1964-66

St. Francis de Sales Catholic Church is a parish of the Roman Catholic Church in Norton Shores, Michigan, US. With a membership of about 1,300 households, it is the largest parish in the surrounding Muskegon area. The parish's current building, noted for its hyperbolic paraboloid form and brutalist design, was designed by modernist architect Marcel Breuer and his associate Herbert Beckhard in 1964.

== History ==
St. Francis de Sales parish was founded in 1948. The church originally met in Ruddiman Terrace, a WWII-era federally constructed building. Two years later, the church moved to its first full building; the structure sat on McCracken Street, across the street from the current church. The church's new building quickly proved inadequate for the parish's growing membership and by 1958 plans for another structure were underway.

St. Francis de Sales commissioned modernist architect Marcel Breuer to design the structure in 1961; construction on the building began three years later in 1964. Given the structure's unconventional forms, contractors known for expertise in poured concrete were specifically selected for the project.

The first Mass in the new church was celebrated in December 1966 following the completion of the structure.

In 1989 the parish executed a round of renovations that included the addition of south and main entrances and construction of Shepherds Hall, a social center.

In 2011, former Rev. Philip Salmonowicz began a plan to renovate and expand the building; work began in 2016 and ended in 2018. The $2.5 million project included a number of adjustments to the original structure, including a plan to renovate the church's main entrance for increased accessibility and visibility.

== Gallery ==
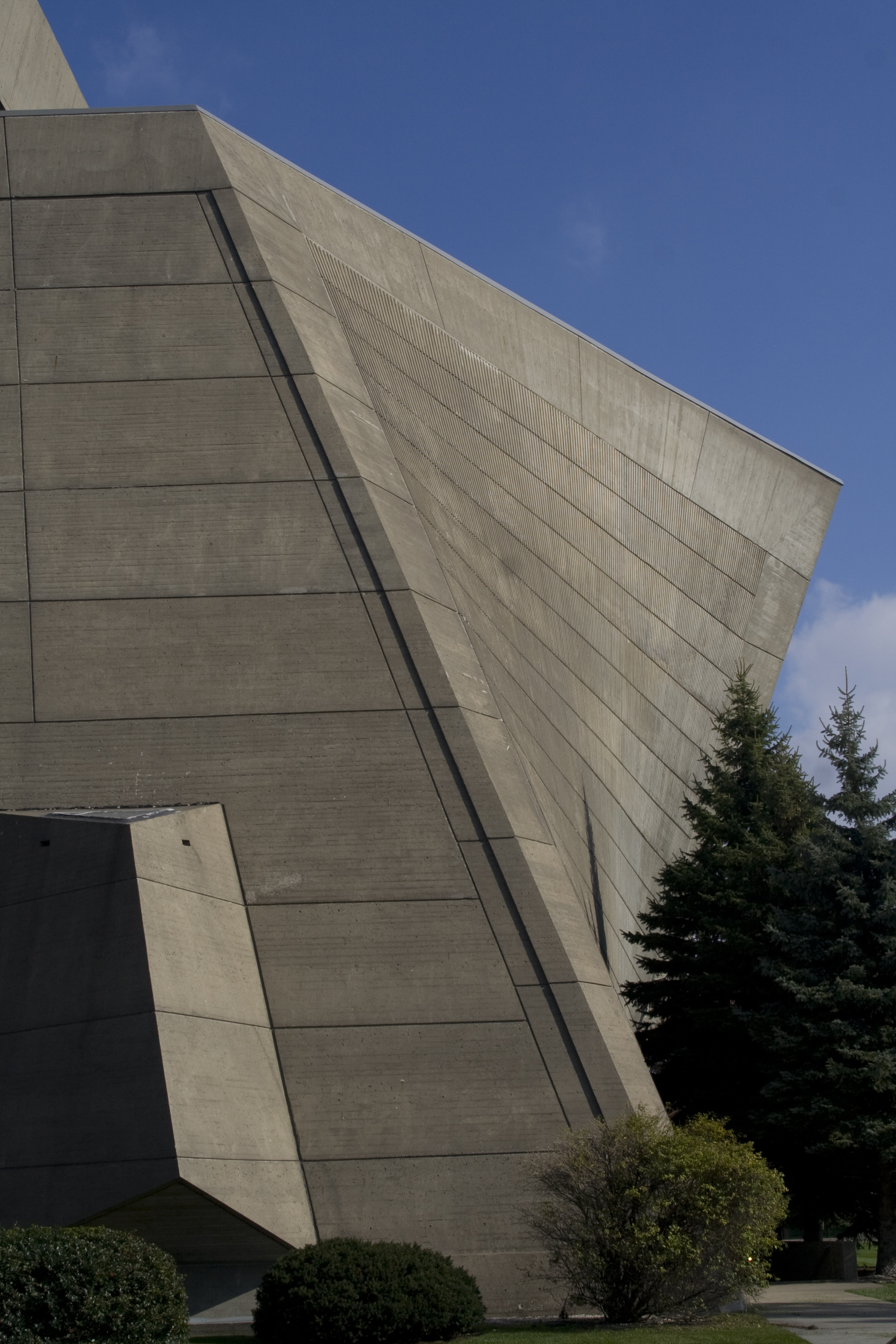
Hyperbolic sidewalls

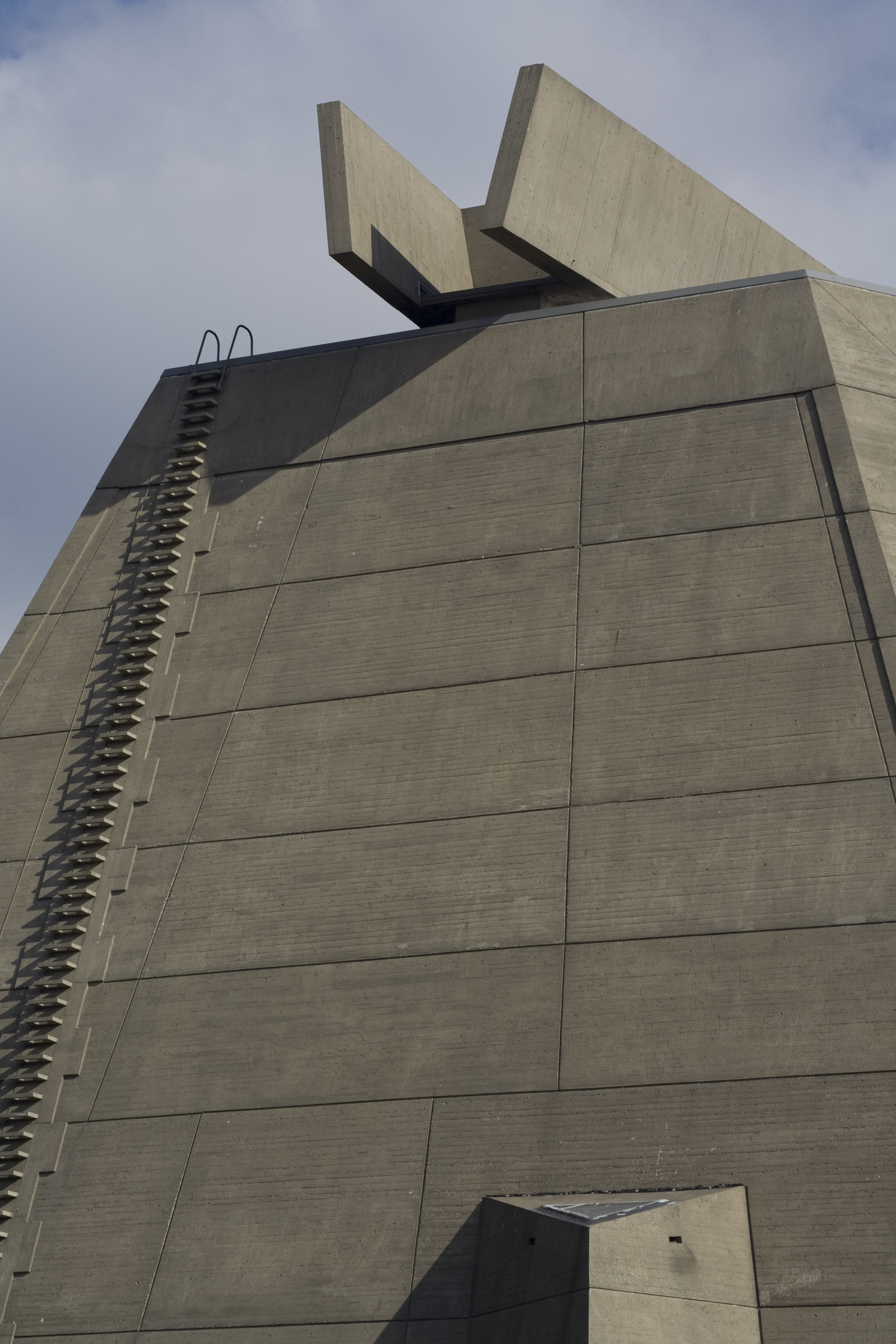
Rear

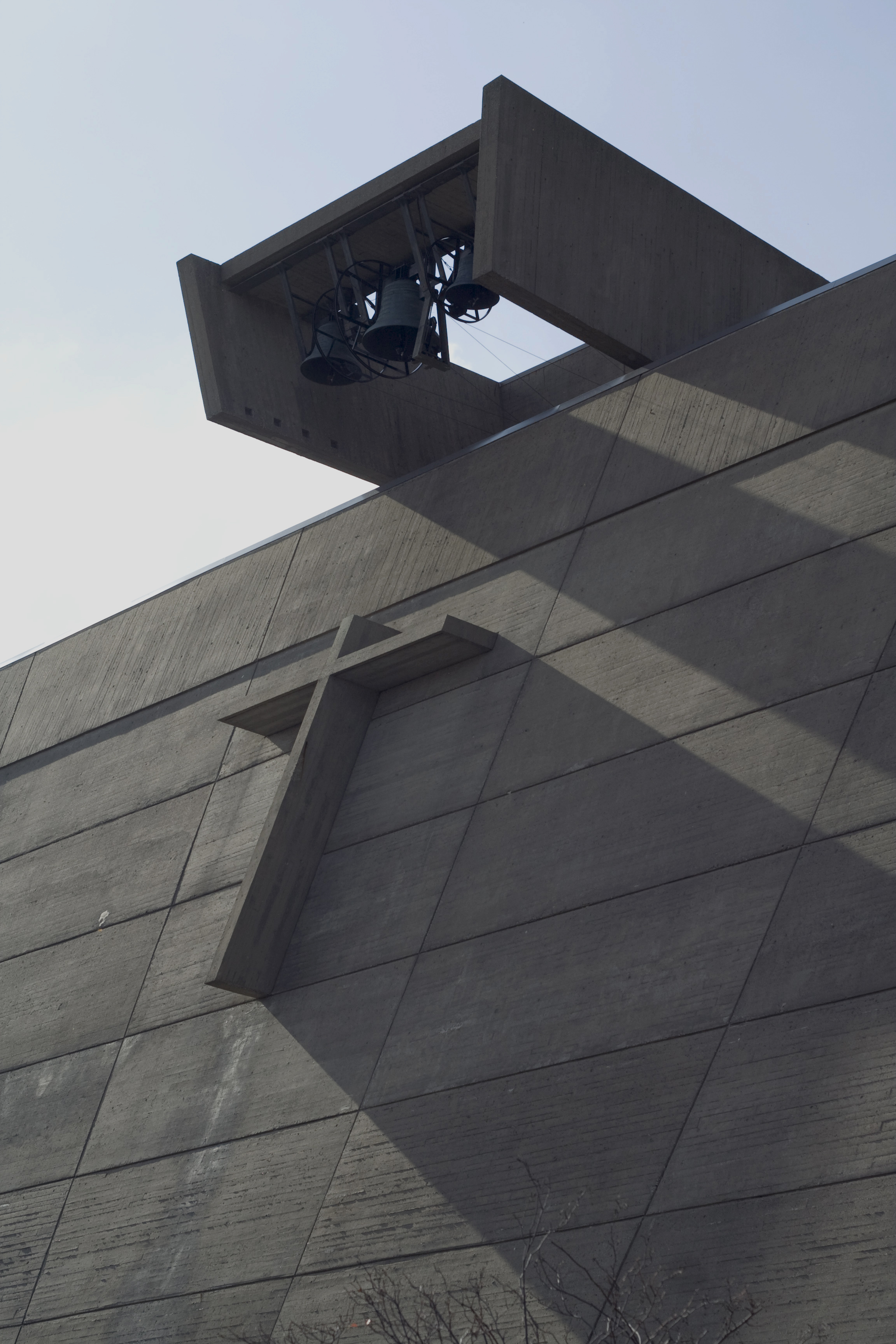
Cross on church facade

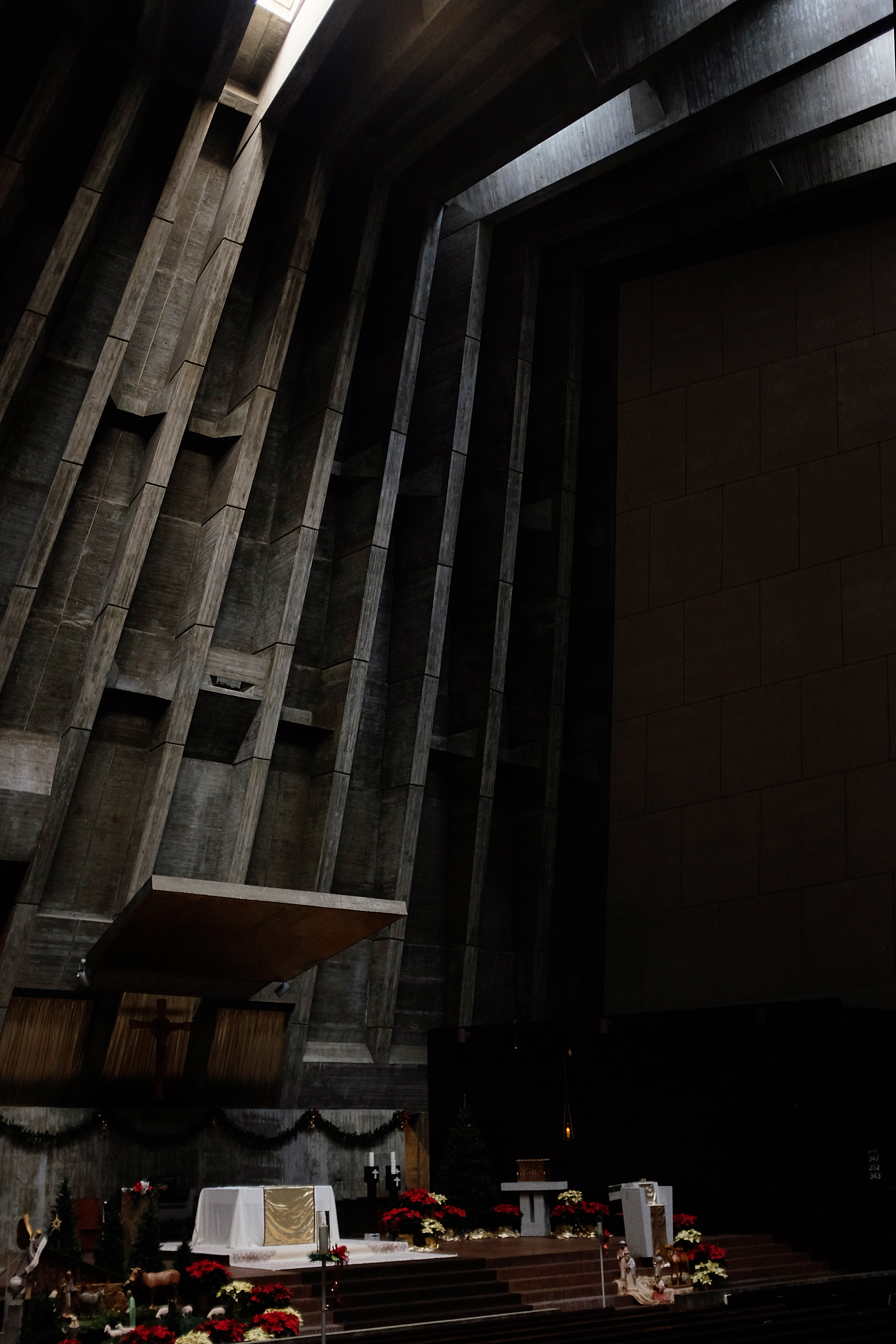
Interior

== See also ==
- List of Brutalist architecture in the United States
- List of Marcel Breuer works

== Works cited ==
- Hyman, Isabelle (2001). Marcel Breuer, Architect: The Career and the Buildings. Harry N. Abrams. ISBN 978-0-8109-4265-3.
- McCarter, Robert (2024). Breuer. Phaidon. ISBN 978-1-83866-947-8.
- Vitra Design Museum (2003). Marcel Breuer : design and architecture. Vitra Design Museum. ISBN 978-3-931936-42-6.
