= Seymour Krieger House =

Historic house in Maryland, United States

- U.S. National Register of Historic Places
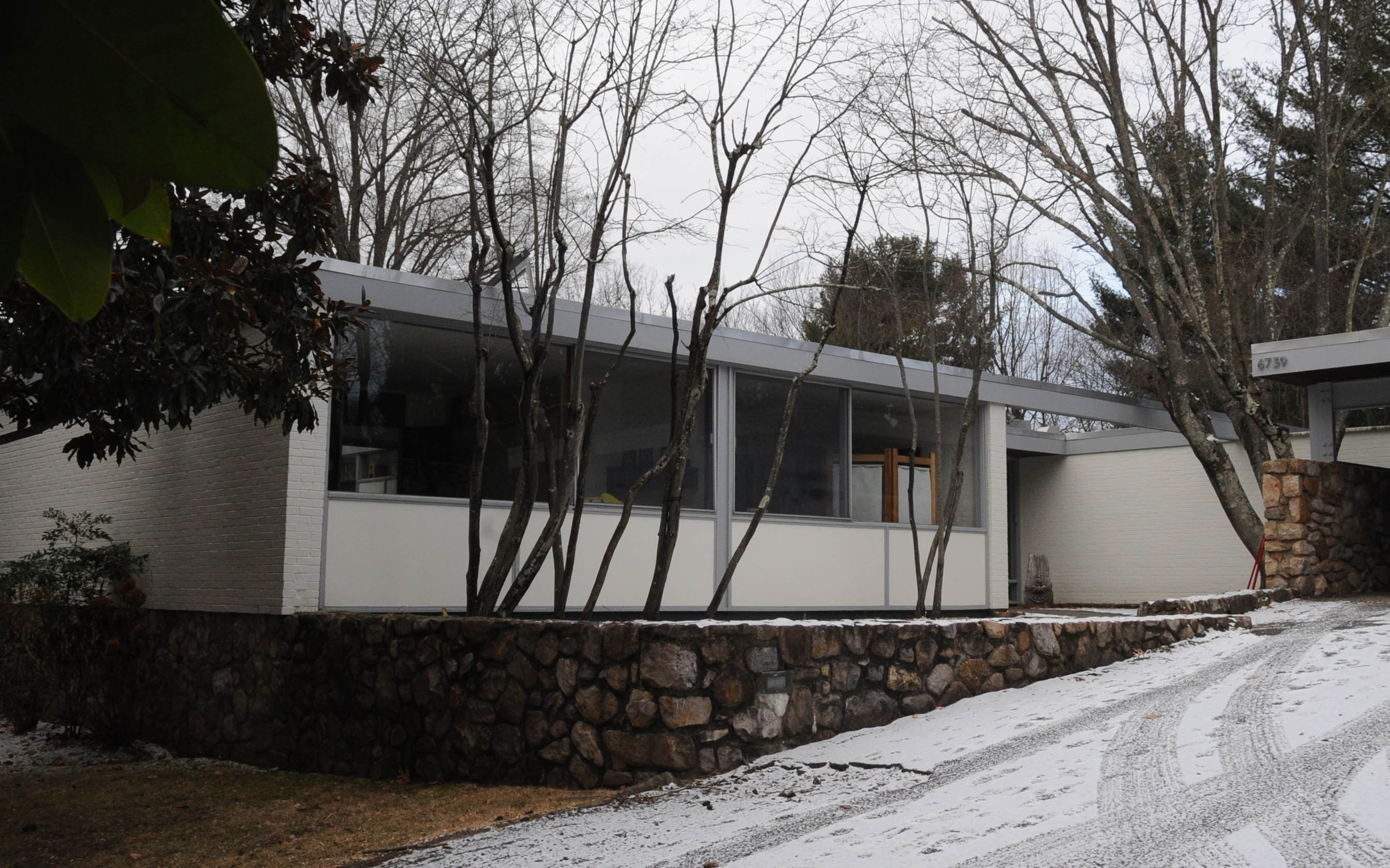

- Location within Maryland Location within the United States
- Location: 6739 Brigadoon Dr., Bethesda, Maryland
- Coordinates: 38°58′35.5″N 77°08′16″W
- Area: less than one acre
- Built: 1958
- Architect: Breuer, Marcel; Kiley, Dan
- Architectural style: International Style
- NRHP reference No.: 08001022
- Added to NRHP: October 29, 2008

The Seymour Krieger House, also known as Katinas House, is a historic home located at Bethesda, Montgomery County, Maryland. It was built in 1958, and is a one-story, steel-framed building constructed of all-stretcher coursed brick (painted white). It features marlite panels with bands of large plate-glass windows and sliding-glass doors set within steel frames. It is set upon a concrete foundation. The International style house is one of four residential buildings architect Marcel Breuer (1902-1981) designed in Maryland. The landscaping was designed by Dan Kiley (1912-2004).

It was listed on the National Register of Historic Places in 2008.

== See also ==
- National Register of Historic Places listings in Montgomery County, Maryland
- List of Marcel Breuer works
