= William Landsberg House =

Historic house in Baxter Estates, New York, United States

- U.S. National Register of Historic Places
- New York State Register of Historic Places
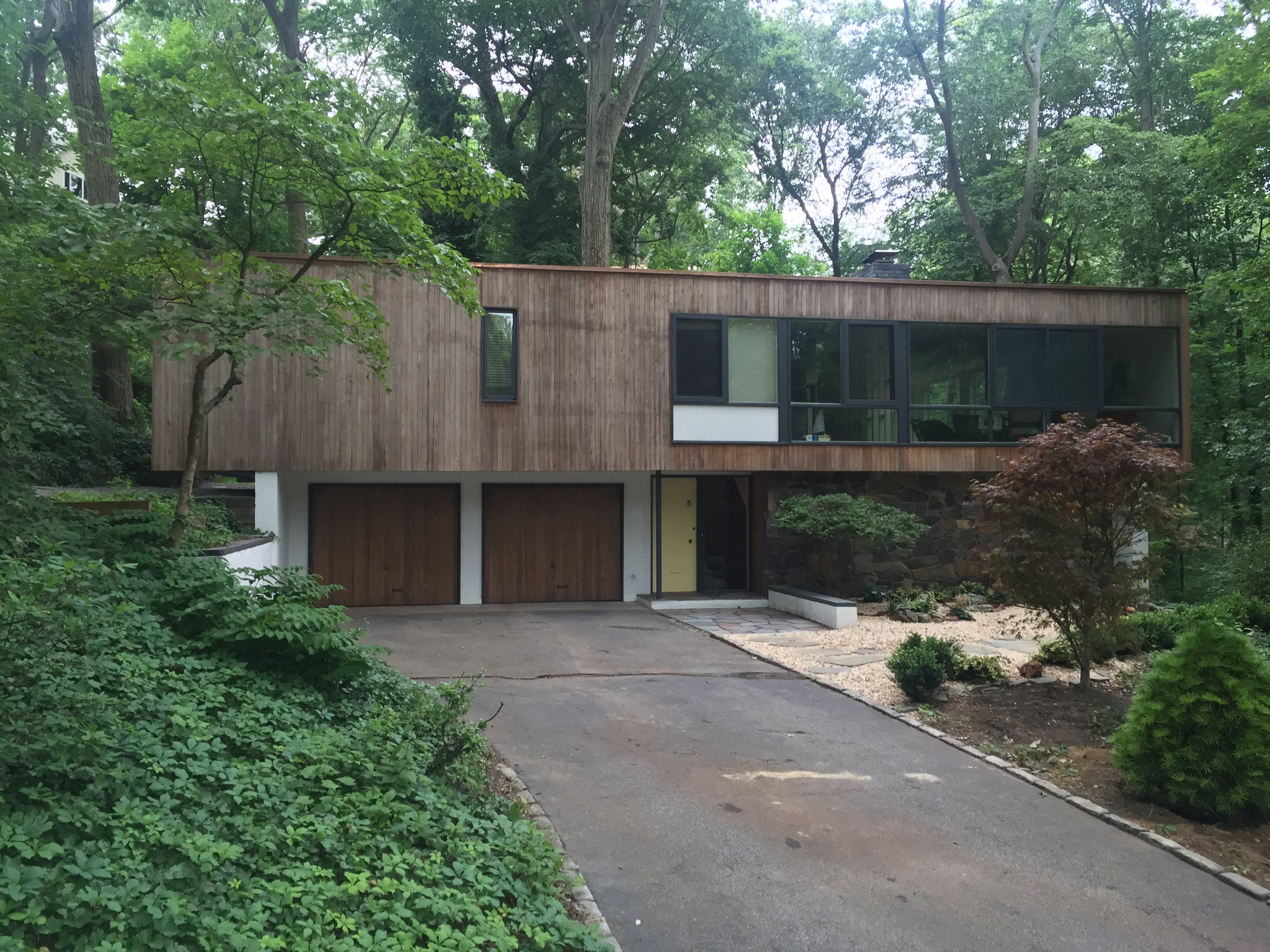
- The Landsberg House, as seen in 2016

- Location within New York Location within the United States
- Location: 5 Tianderah Rd., Port Washington, New York; Village of Baxter Estates
- Coordinates: 40°49′57″N 73°41′40″W
- Area: less than one acre
- Built: 1951
- Architect: William Landsberg
- Architectural style: Modernist Home
- NRHP reference No.: 14000490

Significant dates
- Added to NRHP: August 18, 2014
- Designated NYSRHP: June 19, 2014

William Landsberg House – also known as the Landsberg House and 5 Tianderah Road – is a historic home located on a hill in a wooded area of the Incorporated Village of Baxter Estates in Nassau County, New York, United States. It was designed by architect William Landsberg for himself and his family.

== Description ==
The rectangular house with a flat roof features vertical cypress panels which cover the garage and second story, which cantilevers over the first story by 3 feet on the north and south sides. Custom-sized large windows, a few of which are floor to ceiling, ornament the facades creating an open feeling in the living and dining room.

The house was modified in 1962–1963 to add nine feet, allowing expansion of the kitchen and living room; the rear porch was also replaced with the current stone patio. The house has been unchanged since then. Landsberg lived in the house until his death in 2013. The Landsberg house is considered a significant example of Modernist Architecture created in the United States.

Due to its architectural significance, the Landsberg House was added to the National Register of Historic Places on August 18, 2014. This came just shy of two months after its listing on the New York State Register of Historic Places, which occurred on June 19, 2014.

Landsberg was not well known nationally, but was active on the East Coast – and particularly on Long Island. He was a graduate student at the Harvard Graduate School of Design under Walter Gropius and Marcel Breuer, and worked professionally with both men during his career.

== See also ==
- Baxter Homestead
