= Wolfson Trailer House =

Coordinates: 41°48′32.1″N 73°45′42.9″W

Wolfson Trailer House is a 1949 house designed by the pioneering modernist Marcel Breuer in Salt Point, New York, United States. Commissioned by Breuer's friend, the artist Sydney Wolfson, it is among the most distinctive of Breuer's residential designs. Wolfson requested that Breuer integrate his 37-foot 1948 Spartan Royal Mansion trailer as one wing of the house, which Breuer initially resisted before agreeing to.

The house features many Breuer hallmarks: cantilevered living space, a central fireplace made of native stone, and natural wood finishes. The house sits on 20 acres of land abutting Wappinger Creek in Dutchess County north of New York City.

In 1950, a separate artist's studio was added to the property. In 2015, a 4000 square foot home designed in dialogue with the original Breuer structure was completed on the property.
