= Cesca chair =

1928 chair design created by Marcel Breuer

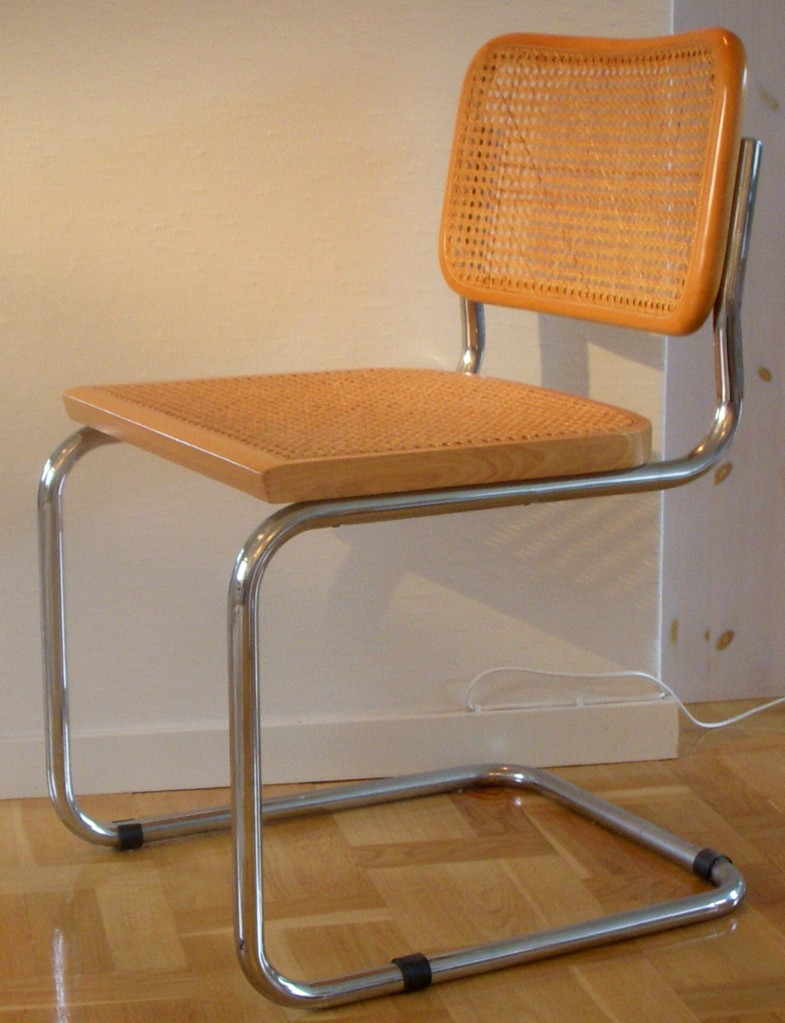
Side view of a Cesca chair

The Cesca chair (/ˈtʃɛskə/) is a chair design created in 1928 by the Hungarian-American architect and designer Marcel Breuer. It consists of a tubular steel frame and a rattan seat and backing, and was the first such tubular-steel-frame, caned-seat chair to be mass-produced. The design was named as a tribute to Breuer's adopted daughter Francesca (nicknamed Cesca).

The design was purchased in 1968 by Knoll Associates. Since then, approximately 250,000 of the chairs have been purchased. The three official manufacturers of the chair were Thonet (from 1927), Gavina (1950s), and Knoll (1960s - present.).

An original Cesca from 1928 is stored in the Museum of Modern Art in Manhattan. Cara McCarty, a curator at the museum, referred to the chair as being "among the 10 most important chairs of the 20th century".
