= Doldertal Apartment Houses =

Residential building in Zürich, Switzerland

- Mehrfamilienhäuser Doldertal
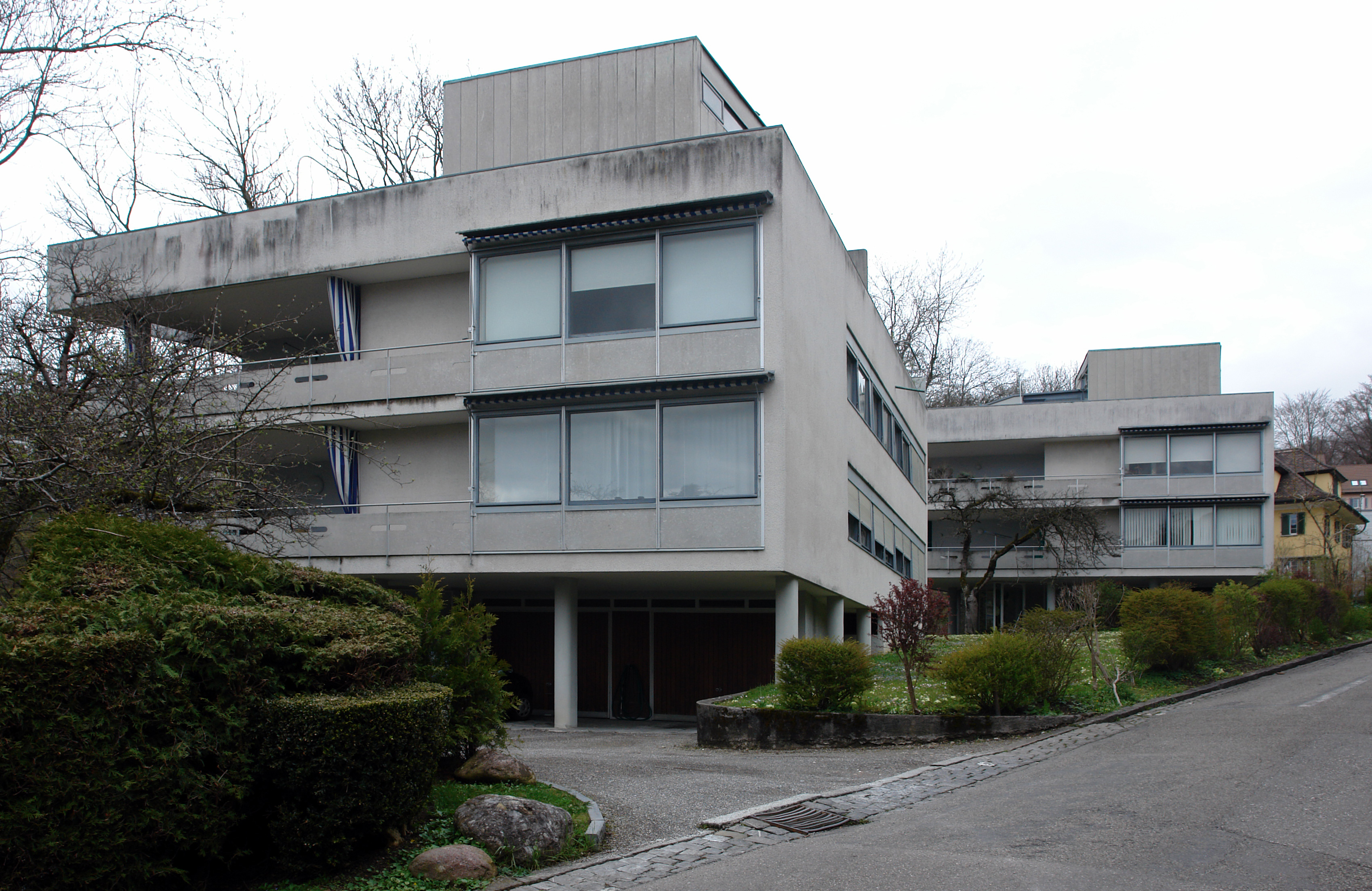
- South facade of the living quarters on Lake Zurich
- Interactive map of the Doldertal Apartment Houses area

General information
- Architectural style: Modernism
- Location: Zürich, Switzerland, Doldertal 17 and 19, Zürich, Switzerland
- Coordinates: 47°22′23″N 8°33′45″E
- Completed: 1936
- Client: Sigfried Giedion

Technical details
- Floor count: 3

Design and construction
- Architects: Alfred Roth; Emil Roth; Marcel Breuer

The Doldertal Apartment Houses (German: Mehrfamilienhäuser Doldertal) are a group of modern apartment buildings in Doldertal, a suburb of Zürich on the slope of the Adlisberg mountain. The buildings were designed by architects Alfred Roth, Emil Roth, and reviewed by Marcel Breuer. They were built in 1936.

They were commissioned by Sigfried Giedion, architectural historian, who was cofounder and first secretary-general of the Congrès International d'Architecture Moderne (CIAM) who would later be recruited, alongside Breuer, to the faculty of Harvard University at the behest of Walter Gropius.

The complex has a steel-frame infrastructure and a projecting walls of glass windows. It has been described as a "tensile box notable for its tightness and control.

The architectural model for the apartment complex is held in the permanent collection of the Museum of Modern Art in New York City.

== Gallery ==
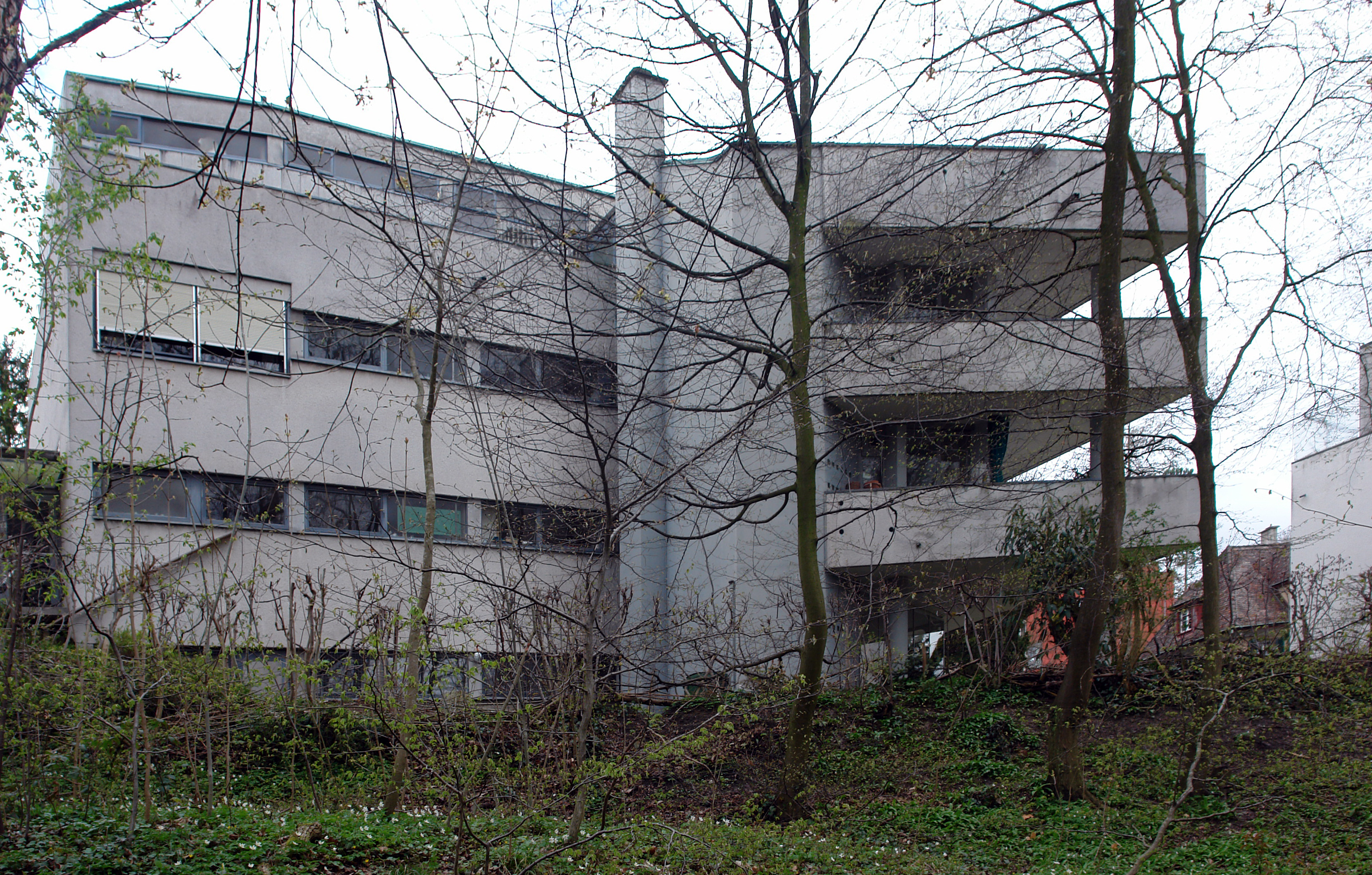
The bedrooms are on the Doldertal cul-de-sac

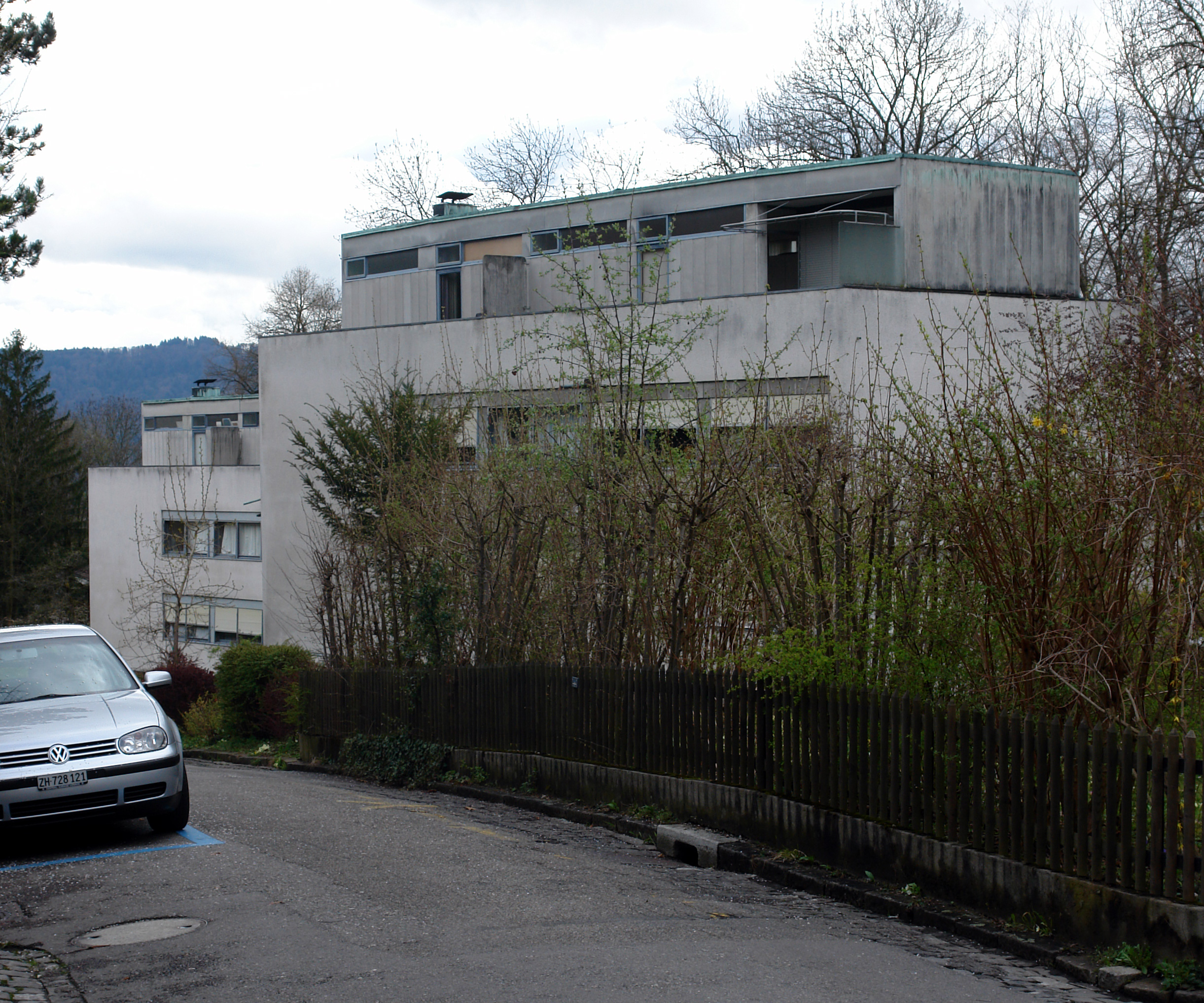
The ancillary rooms
