= Hooper House (Baltimore County, Maryland) =

House in Baltimore County, Maryland

Hooper House II
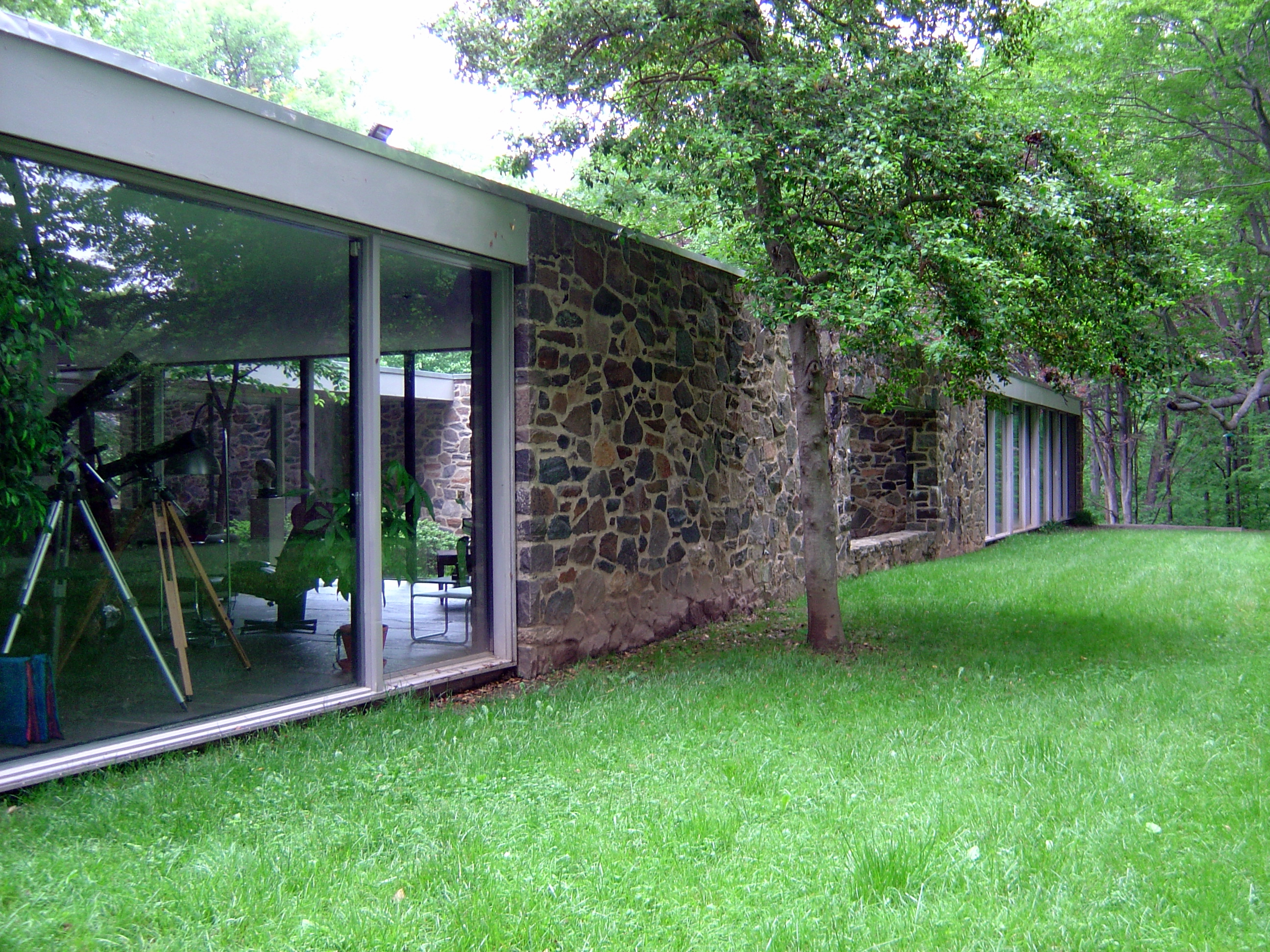
- Interactive map of the Hooper House II area

General information
- Type: Single Family Residence
- Architectural style: Bauhaus
- Location: Copper Hill Road; Baltimore, Maryland
- Coordinates: 39°23′8.5″N 76°38′47.5″W
- Construction started: 1957
- Completed: 1959
- Cost: $171,617
- Client: Arthur and Edith Hooper
- Owner: Richard North M.D.

Technical details
- Floor count: 1 + partial basement/underground garage
- Floor area: 6,994 square feet (649.8 m^{2})

Design and construction
- Architects: Marcel Breuer; Herbert Beckhard, associate
- Other designers: Daniel Kiley (Landscape Architect)
- Main contractor: Harry H. Hudgins
- Awards: Architectural Record House of 1961

The Hooper House, also known as Hooper House II, is located in Bare Hills in Baltimore County, Maryland, United States. It was commissioned by philanthropist Edith Hooper, and designed by architects Marcel Breuer and Herbert Beckhard. Breuer had designed an addition to the Hoopers' prior home in Baltimore in 1948; that home is often referred to as "Hooper House I", which is why this newer residence is often called "Hooper House II". Ground was broken on the project in 1958 and the house was completed in 1959.

== Design ==
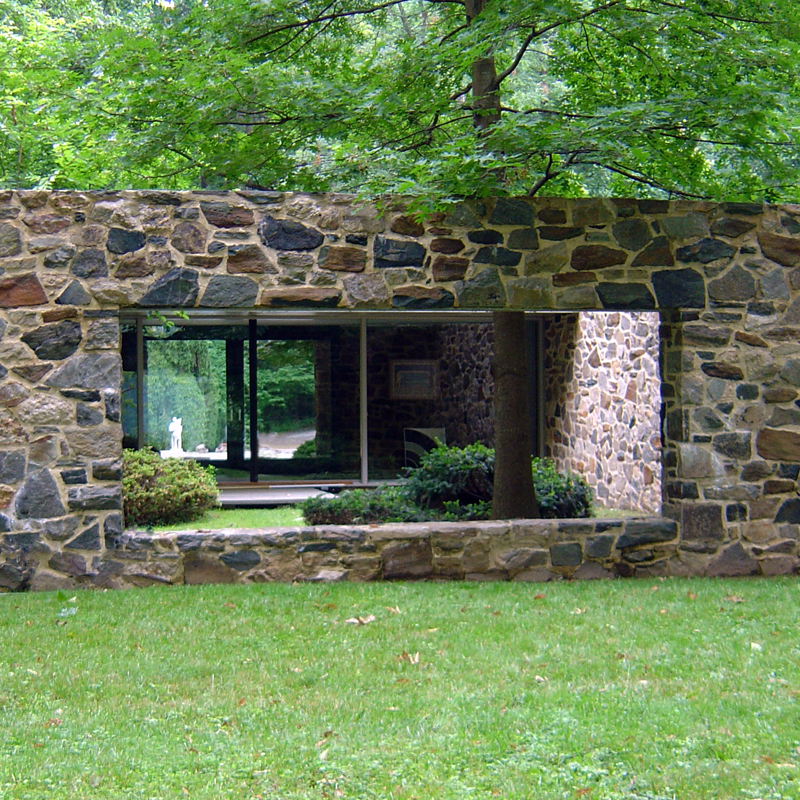
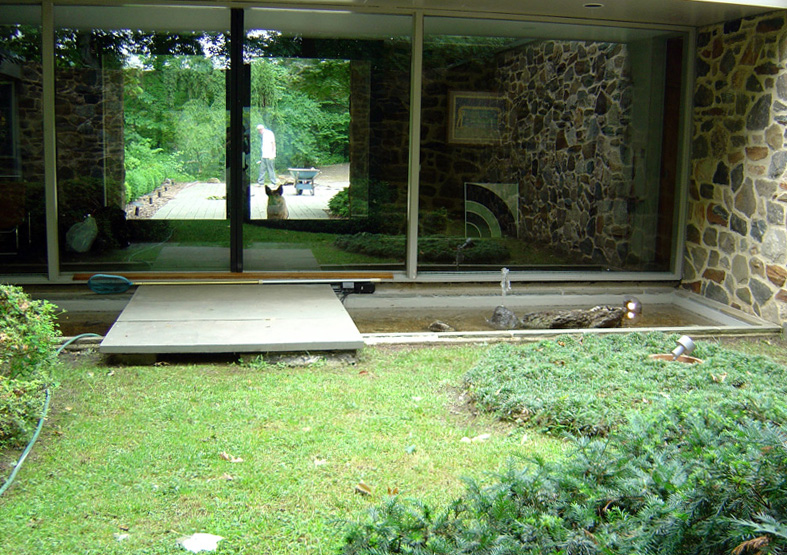
Other views of the house

One of the most immediately apparent as well as fundamentally important features of this home is its "binuclear" design: A central courtyard divides the house into living/dining/cooking/entertaining and family/bedroom areas. The front door faces the center of the courtyard, where glass doors and a large rectangular opening in the stone of the rear wall frame an unobstructed view literally through the home and to Lake Roland to the east. Not only is this impressive visually, but the "binuclear" design is extremely practical for the family occupying the home: guests can be entertained in the living room in the south wing of the house, without disturbing family members in their bedrooms in the north wing of the house. The impressive noise management is enhanced by the thick stone walls, one of which is on the side of the family wing facing the courtyard, broken only by a relatively narrow doorway to the front entry hall. In the two images below, the living area/bedrooms are to the right, and the living room/kitchen/dining room are on the left. The perspective is actually "backwards", in that these images are looking from the rear of the house towards the front door (facing west). Many images of the home are taken from this perspective, as this side of the house faces the lake and is covered in glass, while the west wall is a long wall of Maryland fieldstone, broken only by the front door and otherwise relatively featureless. Every room except for the bathrooms, the "family room", and the kitchen are located along the home's periphery and therefore have an entire wall that is made of glass, half of which is a floor to ceiling sliding-glass door. The living room actually has three such doors because there is so much glass.

When this home was built, insulated glass was not as common as it is today – especially for windows as large as 8½ by 10 feet – and so all the glazing in the house is 1/4" plate glass, with an R-value of 1. Replacing it all with insulated glass to save energy would have a payback period several times the warranty for the new glazing – which has a perimeter seal between its two or more panes, subject to eventual failure. The original glass, which has no such failure mode, remains clear after 50 years.
