= William Landsberg =

American architect

William W. Landsberg
- Born: February 9, 1915; Brooklyn, New York
- Died: October 6, 2013 (aged 98); Port Washington, New York
- Education: Carnegie Institute of Technology, Harvard Graduate School of Design
- Occupation: Architect
- Practice: Marcel Breuer, Independent Practice, Shreve Lamb & Harmon, Skidmore, Owings & Merrill, Kahn & Jacobs, Hellmuth, Obata & Kassabaum, Edward Durell Stone

William W. Landsberg (February 9, 1915 – October 6, 2013) was a Brooklyn-born modernist architect who designed dozens of homes, synagogues, and commercial buildings in the New York metropolitan area in the 50s and 60s. Landsberg studied at the Harvard Graduate School of Design under Marcel Breuer and Walter Gropius. He worked for both after graduation.

== Life and career ==
Born in Bensonhurst, Brooklyn, in 1915, William W. Landsberg graduated from Carnegie-Mellon University in 1936 with a Bachelor of Architecture degree. He then attended the Harvard Graduate School of Design to study Modern architecture from masters Walter Gropius and Marcel Breuer. He graduated in 1938, and from 1939 to 1940, worked as a draftsman in the firm of Gropius & Breuer.

Landsberg married Muriel Ginsberg in 1941 and, serving as an Army architect, was deployed to St. John's, Newfoundland, where he lived for two years, designing and supervising the building of military air bases for WWII Allies. Landsberg later served with the 1253rd Combat Engineers Battalion of the 9th Army and participated in the crossing of the Rhine in March 1945.

In 1948 on the streets of Manhattan, Landsberg ran into former teacher and employer Breuer, who asked Landsberg to leave his current position at Skidmore, Owings & Merrill and join Breuer's newly created firm. As Director of Design, Landsberg and Breuer worked closely together on a number of projects, including the exhibition house for the House in the Garden series at the Museum of Modern Art. As Breuer's most trusted associate, Landsberg would create proper architectural drawings from Breuer's illustrations and ideas. Landsberg would also write correspondence on behalf of Breuer, as according to Landsberg, “his command of English was not so good”. Landsberg worked with Breuer on several commercial and residential commissions in the Long Island, NY area including Hanson House in Lloyd Harbor, the Witalis House in Kings Point, and the O.E. McIntyre Plant in Westbury, NY. Landsberg left Breuer's employment in 1956.

William Landsberg started his own design firm in Port Washington, NY, in 1956 where he would design homes, synagogues, and commercial buildings and continue his working relationship with Breuer. In 1957, Landsberg designed a house for Randall and Helen McIntyre in Deer Park, NY which was awarded Architectural Record's House-of-the-Year award and was featured in the magazine.

In the early 60s and beyond, Landsberg worked as Project Architect for many large New York firms, including Kahn & Jacobs HOK and Edward Durell Stone. He also spent time creating his own artwork, and became very active in community affairs such as the North Shore Community Arts Center and the Manhasset Art Association. Landsberg also served as a local Building Inspector and Board Member of Zoning Appeals. He also presided as President of the local chapter of American Field Services.

== William Landsberg House ==
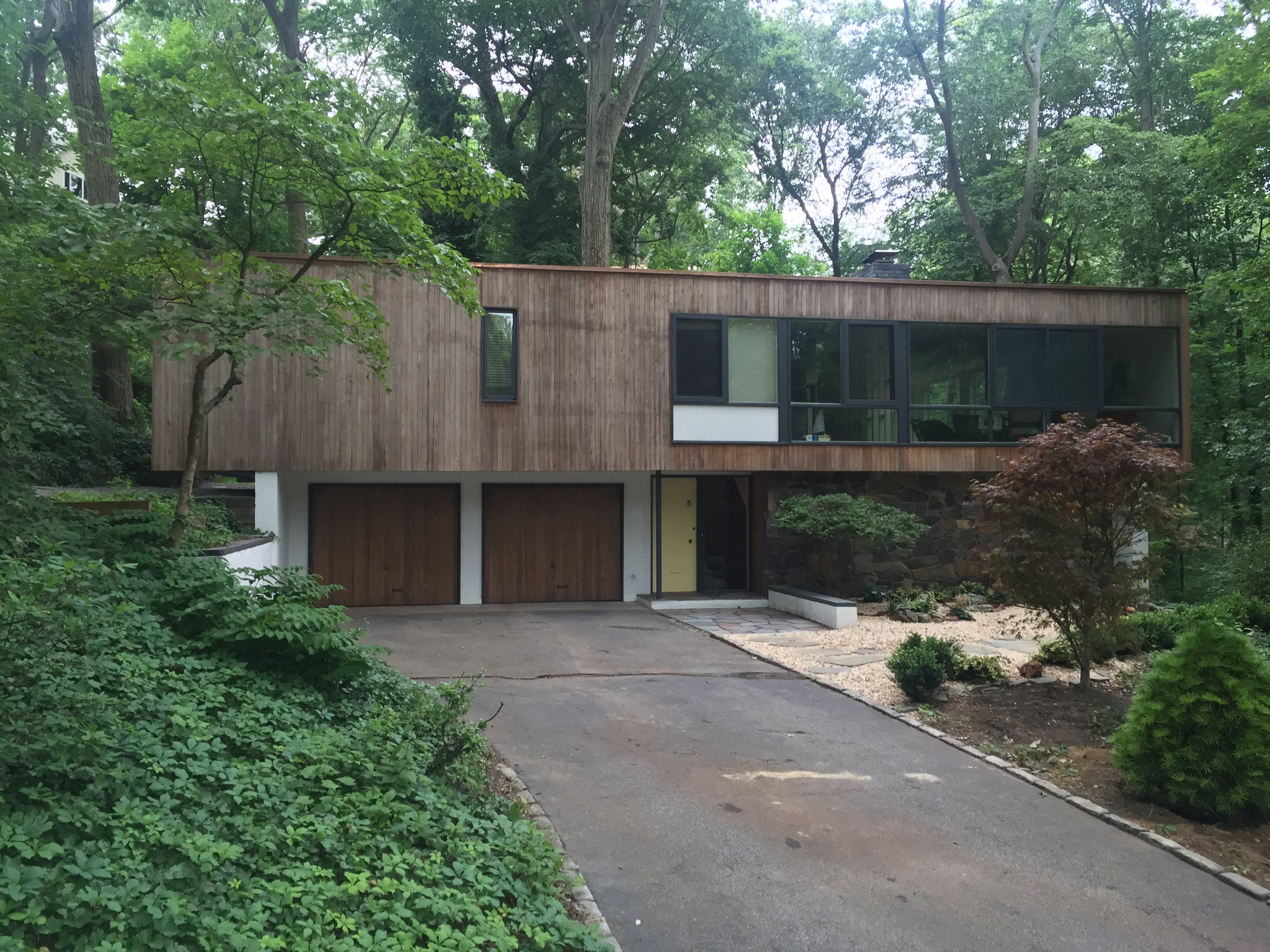
William Landsberg House

Landsberg moved to Port Washington, NY, designing and building a house for his family in 1951. Featured in international books, journals, magazines, newspapers, and museum exhibits, this house was the most recognized of his independent projects. The house was occupied by Landsberg and his family until his death in 2013 and is still extant.

The William Landsberg House is situated in a residential area on the north shore of Long Island, built on a hill in a wooded area. The rectangular house with a flat roof features vertical cypress panels which cover the garage and second story, which cantilevers over the first story by 3 feet on the north and south sides. Custom-sized large windows, a few of which are floor to ceiling, ornament the facades creating an open feeling in the living and dining room. The Landsberg house is considered a significant example of Bauhaus style Modern Architecture created in the United States, and as such was added to the National Register of Historic Places on August 18, 2014.

== Buildings ==
- 1950 Dr. Robert and Alyce Ritt House - Long Beach, NY
- 1951 William and Muriel Landsberg House - Port Washington, NY
- 1951 Dr. Arthur Nightingale - Garden City, NY
- 1952 Perry House - New Milford, CT - with Herbert Berkhard
- 1953 Rudolph and Mildred Joseph House I - Freeport, NY
- 1954 O E McIntyre, Inc – Manufacturing Plant - Westbury, NY – with Marcel Breuer
- 1956 Rudolph and Mildred Joseph House II - Freeport, NY
- 1956 Abram and Elizabeth Blumenthal House - Woodbrook, MD
- 1957 Ethical Humanist Society of Garden City - Garden City, NY
- 1957 Randall and Helen McIntyre House - Deer Park, NY
- 1957 Angus and Bobbie McIntyre House - Deer Park, NY
- 1957 Albert and Pats Bildner House - Yorktown Heights, NY
- 1958 Rostock House - Queens, NY
- 1959 Fishgold House - Little Neck, NY
- 1959 Genn House - Tenafly, NJ
- 1959 Westchester Reform Temple – Scarsdale, NY – with Marcel Breuer
- 1960 Keevil House - Old Westbury, NY
- 1961 Eugene and Doris Leonard House - Sands Point, NY
- 1961 John and Zula Crichton House - New Canaan, CT
- 1961 Dr. Klaus Mayer House - Riverdale, NY
- 1962 Peter J White Jr. House - Lloyd Harbor, NY
- 1963 Roslyn Animal Hospital - Roslyn, NY
- ? Weinstock House - Sherman, CT

== See also ==
- National Register of Historic Places listings in North Hempstead (town), New York
