= Starkey House =

Modernist house in Duluth, Minnesota

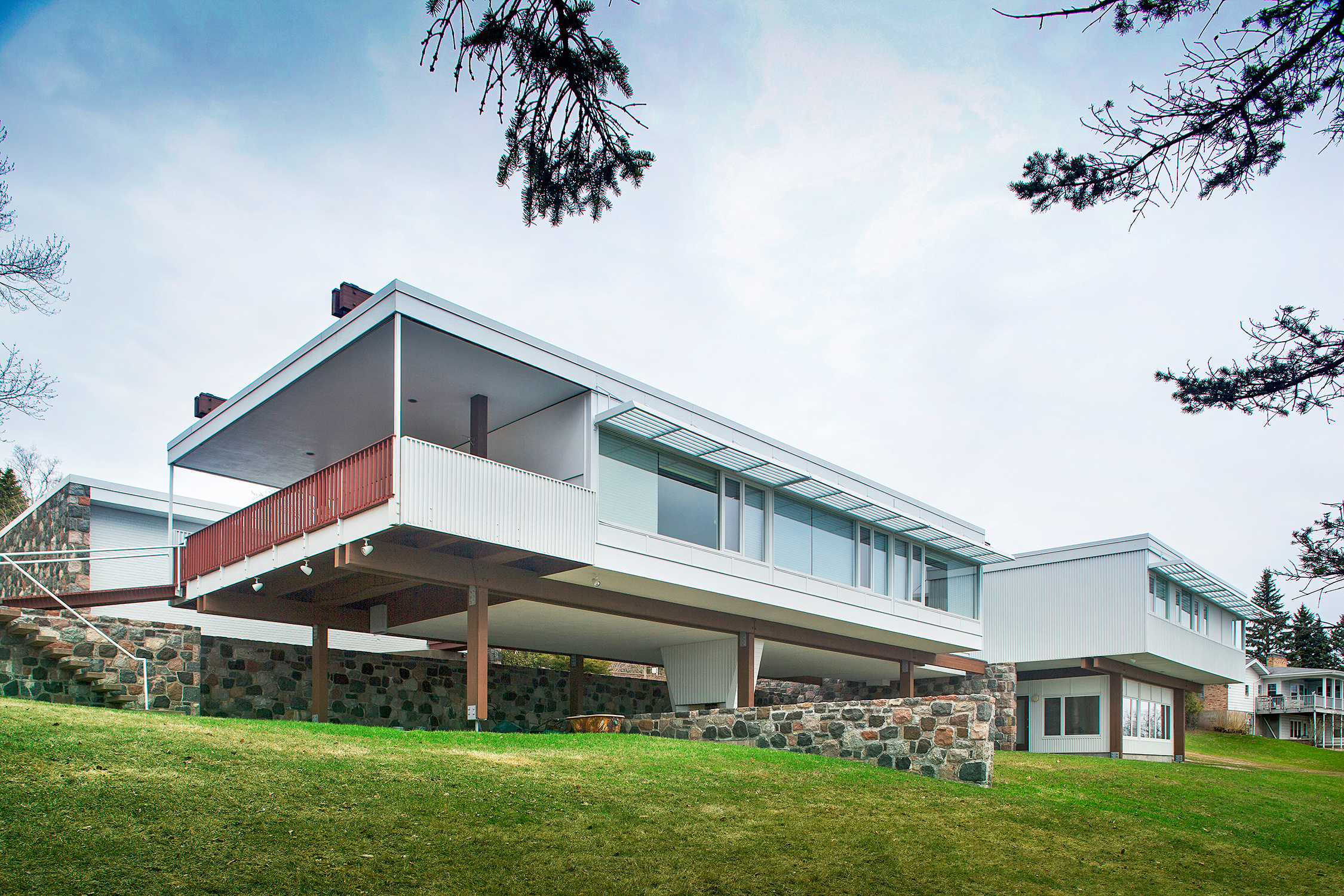

- Location within Minnesota
- Interactive map showing the Starkey House location

General information
- Location: 2620 Greysolon Rd, Duluth, Minnesota 55812
- Coordinates: 46.81078°N 92.06252°W
- Construction started: 1954
- Client: June Halverson Alworth

Technical details
- Floor area: 4,200 sq ft (390 m^{2})

Design and construction
- Architect: Marcel Breuer

The Starkey House, also known as the Alworth House, is a residence in Duluth, Minnesota, United States, overlooking Lake Superior. The house was designed by modernist architect Marcel Breuer in 1954 and 1955 for June Halverson Starkey (née Alworth). The building's design references Breuer's hallmark bi-nuclear plan, in which sleeping and living spaces are linked through the home's entrance. The house was commissioned by June Halvorson Alworth, a widow who later married Robert Starkey.

== Structure ==
The house consisted of two large, rectangular volumes of unequal size while were on the side of a hill. They were supported by wood columns and laminated girders. One contained the bedrooms and children's playroom while the other contained the open-plan living and dining rooms. The upper floor of the house had board-and-batten siding, while the facades facing the lake featured large expanses of windows shielded by glass sunshades. A separate volume constructed of fieldstone and painted brick contained the garage.
