= Gropius =

Gropius is a German surname. Notable people with the surname include:

- Ati Gropius Johansen (1926–2014), daughter of Walter Gropius and his second wife Ilse
- Karl Wilhelm Gropius, also Carl Wilhelm (1793–1870), German painter and stage set maker
- Manon Gropius (1916–1935), daughter of Walter Gropius and Alma Mahler-Werfel
- Martin Gropius (1824–1880), Historicist architect (uncle of Walter Gropius)
- Walter Gropius (1883–1969), Bauhaus architect

== See also ==
- Gropius House, the house Walter Gropius built for himself and his family in Lincoln, MA, USA
- Gropiusstadt, a planned community designed by Walter Gropius in Berlin-Neukölln, Germany
- Martin-Gropius-Bau, museum and exhibition hall in Berlin, Germany
- Walter-Gropius-Haus (Berlin), a residential building designed by Walter Gropius
- Natural Harmonia Gropius, a character in the Pokémon gaming franchise
