= Woods End Road Historic District =

Historic district in Massachusetts, United States

- U.S. National Register of Historic Places
- U.S. Historic district
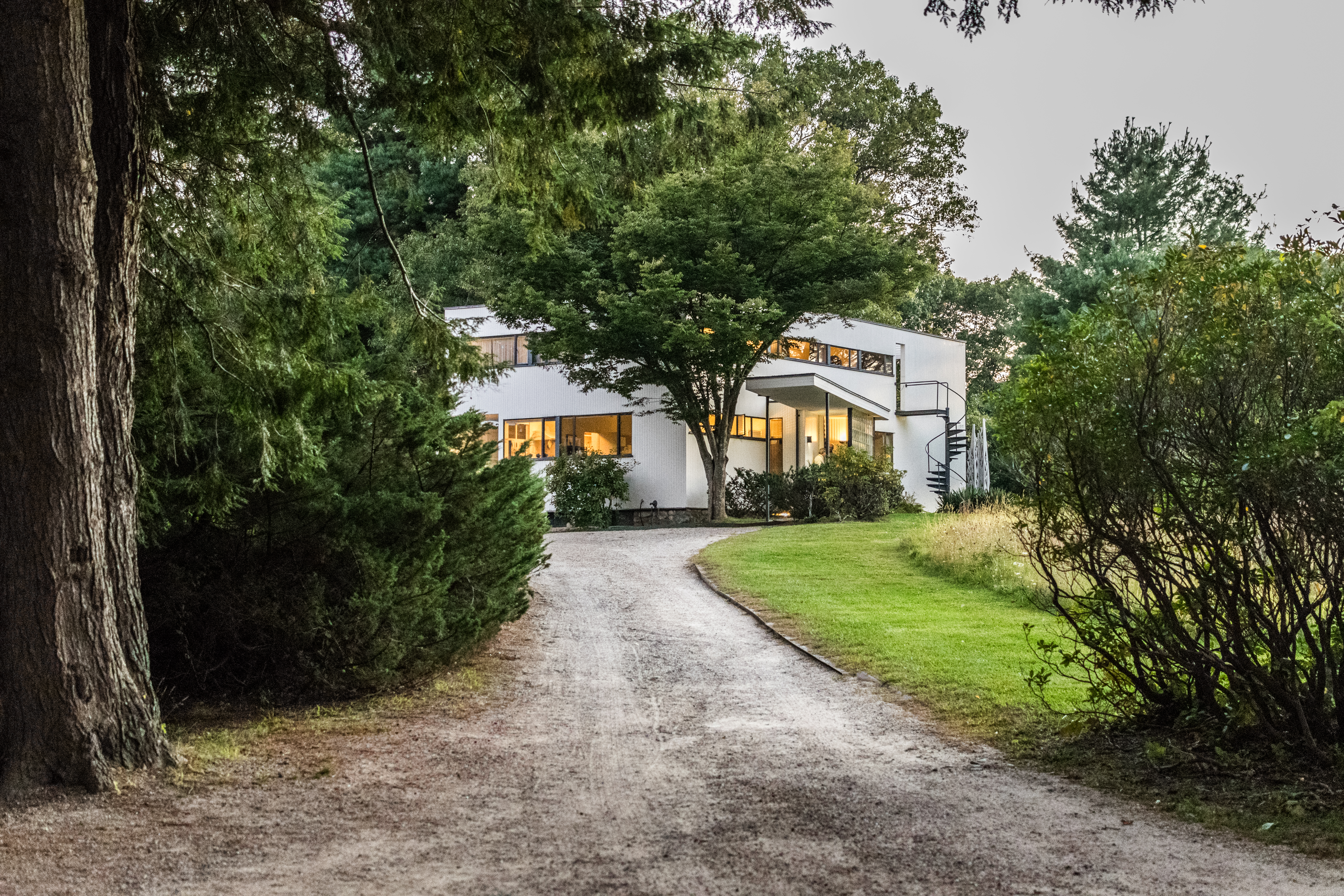
- The Gropius House at 68 Baker Bridge Road, one of the five houses in the district, seen from a driveway

- Location within Massachusetts Location within the United States
- Location: Lincoln, Massachusetts
- Coordinates: 42°25′36″N 71°19′41″W
- Area: 17 acres (6.9 ha)
- Built: 1938
- Architects: Walter Gropius and Marcel Breuer (Gropius, Breuer, and Ford houses); Walter Bogner (Bogner House); Constance Mumford Warren (Loud House)
- Architectural style: Late 19th and 20th Century Revivals, International Style
- NRHP reference No.: 88000956
- Added to NRHP: July 8, 1988

The Woods End Road Historic District is a historic district in Lincoln, Massachusetts, United States. The district consists of five houses (one in the Federal Revival style and four in the International Style), along with two garages, all built on land owned by the philanthropist Helen Storrow. These buildings were constructed between 1937 and 1939 on a subdivision surrounding a cul-de-sac named Woods End Road. Three of the International Style houses were the residences of their respective architects. The International Style structures are early examples of modernist architecture in the Eastern United States. The district was listed on the National Register of Historic Places in 1988.

The International Style Gropius House at 68 Baker Bridge Road, a National Historic Landmark and house museum, was designed by Bauhaus architect Walter Gropius and his associate Marcel Breuer as Gropius's personal residence. The other four houses are on Woods End Road, including two International Style houses designed by Gropius and Breuer: the Ford House and Breuer's own residence. Walter Bogner also designed an International Style house for himself, while the Federal Revival house was designed by Constance Mumford Warren for John F. Loud.

== Description ==
The Woods End Road Historic District consists of five properties in Middlesex County, Massachusetts, United States. The district is situated between Concord to the west and the town center of Lincoln to the east. The properties take up about 7% of the former estate of the philanthropist Helen Storrow, occupying a 17-acre (6.9 ha) area flanking Woods End Road, a cul-de-sac leading off Baker Bridge Road. Woods End Road was one of several developments built around cul-de-sacs in Lincoln in the early 20th century. The cul-de-sac is surrounded by wooded hillsides, which slope down toward marshes in the west and south, and an orchard to the east.

Each property has a house, and two of the sites also have garages that are contributing properties to the district, for a total of seven structures. Four of the properties are modern houses designed by Walter Gropius, Marcel Breuer, or Walter Bogner, and are sometimes called the Woods End Colony. All but one of the modern houses were designed in part by their own residents; Gropius and Breuer's partnership designed three buildings (including their own residences), while Bogner designed the fourth house for himself. The fifth is a neo-Federal house: the Loud House by Constance Mumford Warren. Four of the five families worked at Harvard University when the houses were built; the fifth was one of Storrow's friends.

Gropius's residence is located at 68 Baker Bridge Road, while the other properties in the district are located at 1, 5, 9, and 10 Woods End Road. The houses' materials and design details were all intended to allude to New England's traditional architecture, though they were designed using three distinct approaches. The Breuer and Gropius commissions were strictly International Style designs; Bogner's house combined the International Style with organic architecture; and the Loud House was strictly revivalist.

=== Gropius House ===
The Gropius House, off Baker Bridge Road at the northeast end of the cul-de-sac, occupies the crest of a hill. It was designed by Gropius and Breuer. The house uses a hybrid of traditional and modern principles and materials, which, in keeping with Gropius's Bauhaus design philosophy, are relatively simple. The house is two stories high, with a largely rectangular massing, and is made mostly of commercially available materials. The building sits on a stone foundation, and its structural system consists of a wood frame. The facade has vertically-oriented redwood planks, which are painted white. The planks are interspersed with casement windows and sash windows. Each elevation of the facade has different details. The exterior incorporates elements such as a spiral staircase, a rear porch, and protruding trellises, along with an angled entrance marquee on its northern elevation. There is a second-story outdoor deck and a partially-enclosed flat roof, the latter of which, at the time of the house's construction, was still uncommon in the area. The roof protrudes outward to the south, shielding the interior spaces.

The interiors span approximately 2,300 square feet (210 m^{2}) and have finishes such as acoustic plaster and wood. The interior spaces are grouped around a central stair hall, which has a curving staircase and a coatroom. They are decorated with furniture from the Gropius family's previous homes, along with objects acquired by or donated to the family. The furnishings are generally in the Modern style, and there are very few pieces of built-in furniture. The first story has a study, living room, dining room, kitchen, pantry, and maid's room. The second story contains three bedrooms and partially overhangs the first story. The house's bathrooms are stacked atop each other and share a plumbing stack.

The district also includes the Gropius House's garage, located northeast of the house, at the bottom of the hill on which the house sits. The garage's location had been suggested by the previous landowner, Helen Storrow, who said a garage further up the hill would be inconvenient to access after a snowstorm. This garage can fit two cars and has a shed roof. Like the main house, the garage has a facade made of white-painted redwood. After the house became a museum in 1985, the garage became a visitor center for the house. The Gropius House is listed as a National Historic Landmark, placing it on the National Register of Historic Places in its own right.

=== Loud House ===
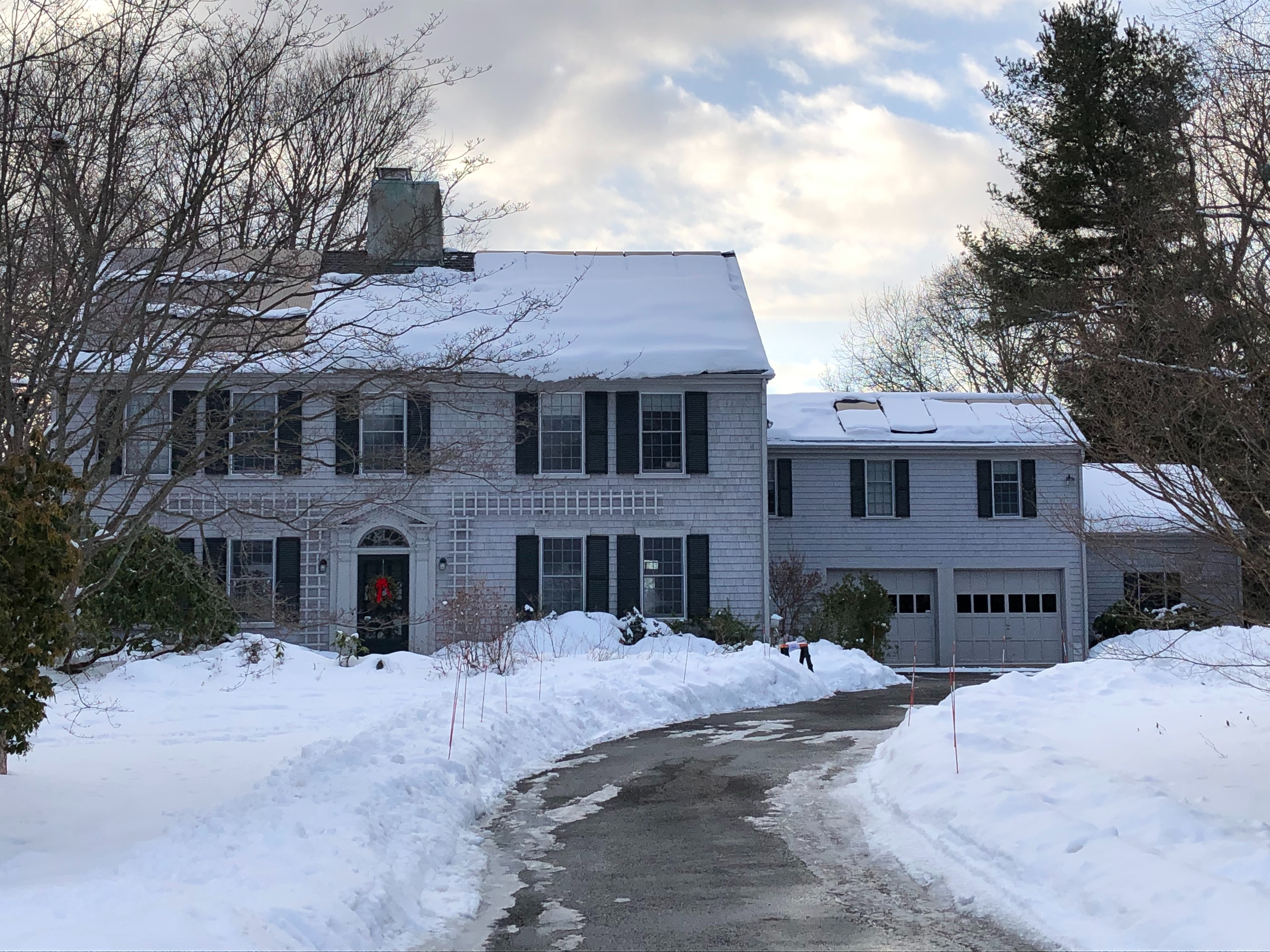
The Loud House at 1 Woods End Road

The John F. Loud House is located at 1 Woods End Road, near the north end of the cul-de-sac. The Loud House is on the western side of the street, directly across Woods End Road from the Gropius House, and is visible from Baker Bridge Road to the north. The house was designed by Constance Mumford Warren, a graduate of the Cambridge School of Architecture and Landscape Architecture. Its Federal Revival design was inspired by a house in Yarmouth, Massachusetts, built c. 1800.

The Loud House measures 2 1/2 stories high, with a 1 1/2-story annex to the north dating from c. 1945. It has a wood frame with a five-bay-wide gray wood-shingle facade, a brick chimney, and an asphalt-paved gable roof. The entrance has a door with pilasters on either side and a fanlight above. The interior plan is federal-inspired, with decorations such as moldings and a living room fireplace mantel inspired by a 1790 house in Charlestown, Boston.

=== Breuer House ===
The Marcel Breuer House (sometimes known as the Breuer House I (Note: The Breuer House I name is used to distinguish from his later houses: House II and House IV in New Canaan, Connecticut, and House III in Wellfleet, Massachusetts.)) is located at 5 Woods End Road. It sits on a ledge and between the Loud House to the north and the Bogner House to the south. The house was designed by both Gropius and Breuer. The front or eastern end of the house is at-grade, and the land slopes down at the rear or west. It has a T-shaped layout, which mostly has bilateral symmetry, unlike many of Breuer's later works. The layout bears similarities to the Storer House by Frank Lloyd Wright and a 1927 proposal for a League of Nations building by Le Corbusier. The Breuer House is divided into three sections: the two-story stack to the east, a living room with double-height ceiling at the center, and a stone porch to the west. The stack forms the head of the "T", being oriented north–south, while the other two sections extend west from there. The entrance porch to the north, wedged between the stack and the living room, was originally the only deviation from the symmetrical layout. A two-story annex to the north and a one-story annex to the east, built by later owners, are designed in a similar style to the main house.

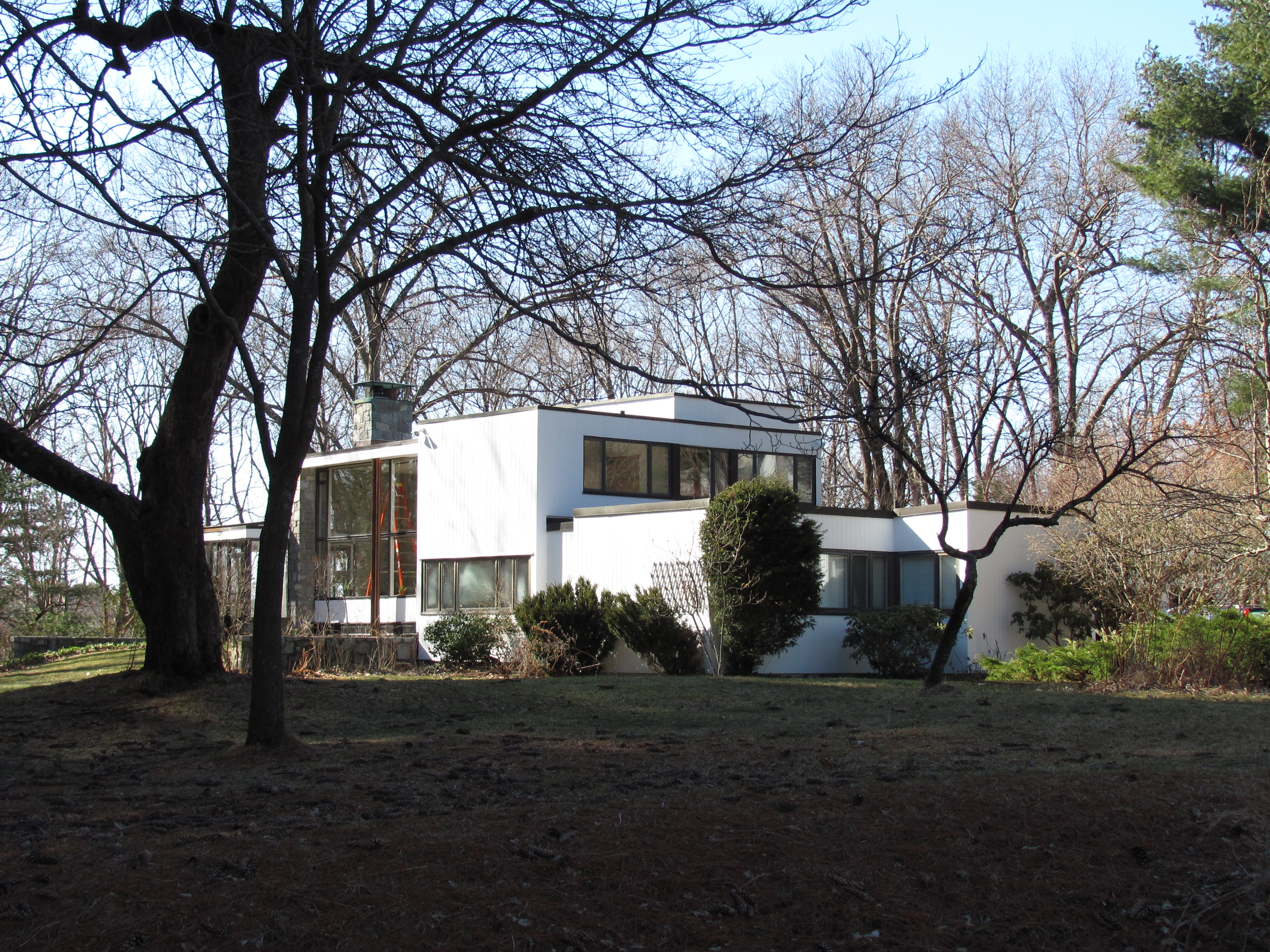
The Breuer House at 5 Woods End Road

The Breuer House is a two-story-high structure clad in redwood, which is laid vertically and interlock with each other in a tongue and groove method. As with the Gropius House, the Breuer House is made mainly of commercially available materials. It has a wood frame and incorporates Bauhaus architectural details. The eastern and southern elevations have casement or sash windows arranged in horizontal ribbons. The southern elevation also has a double-height glass wall overlooking the living room. The western elevation has a fieldstone wall with a convex curve toward the living room, a design feature that Breuer had earlier used in the Gane Pavilion (1936) in Bristol, England. The porch, intended only for seasonal use, is screened on three sides and has a canopy of wooden joists, supported by a series of wood-pine posts. The house's roof is flat and is surfaced with tar and gravel.

The interiors generally have linoleum or carpeted floors, along with fir or plywood walls and ceilings. Though the house measures only two stories high, its interior is split across four levels; this design feature, then a novelty, later became commonplace in other houses. The stack contains a dining room and kitchen on the ground (first) floor and bedrooms on the second floor. The entrance porch is level with the stack's first story to the east, but the living room to the west is four steps above the entrance porch. The living room is surrounded on three sides by walls made of different materials glass, stone, or fir; the stone wall, abutting the porch, has a fireplace. The living room has an open staircase leading to the second-floor bedrooms, which can be separated from the rest of the house by a curtain. The second floor functions as a mezzanine overlooking the living room. Two steps lead down from the living room to the porch. The Breuer House also has niches for garbage disposal and package deliveries, which can be accessed from both the inside and the outside. When Breuer lived there, he furnished it with furniture he designed itself.

The district also includes a wood-frame garage north of the house, which is one story high and can fit two cars. The house originally had a garage with a wedge-shaped or trapezoidal plan, which tapered at the western end and was only partially enclosed, like a carport. The original Breuer garage, which had a wooden frame, was demolished soon after Breuer moved in.

=== Bogner House ===
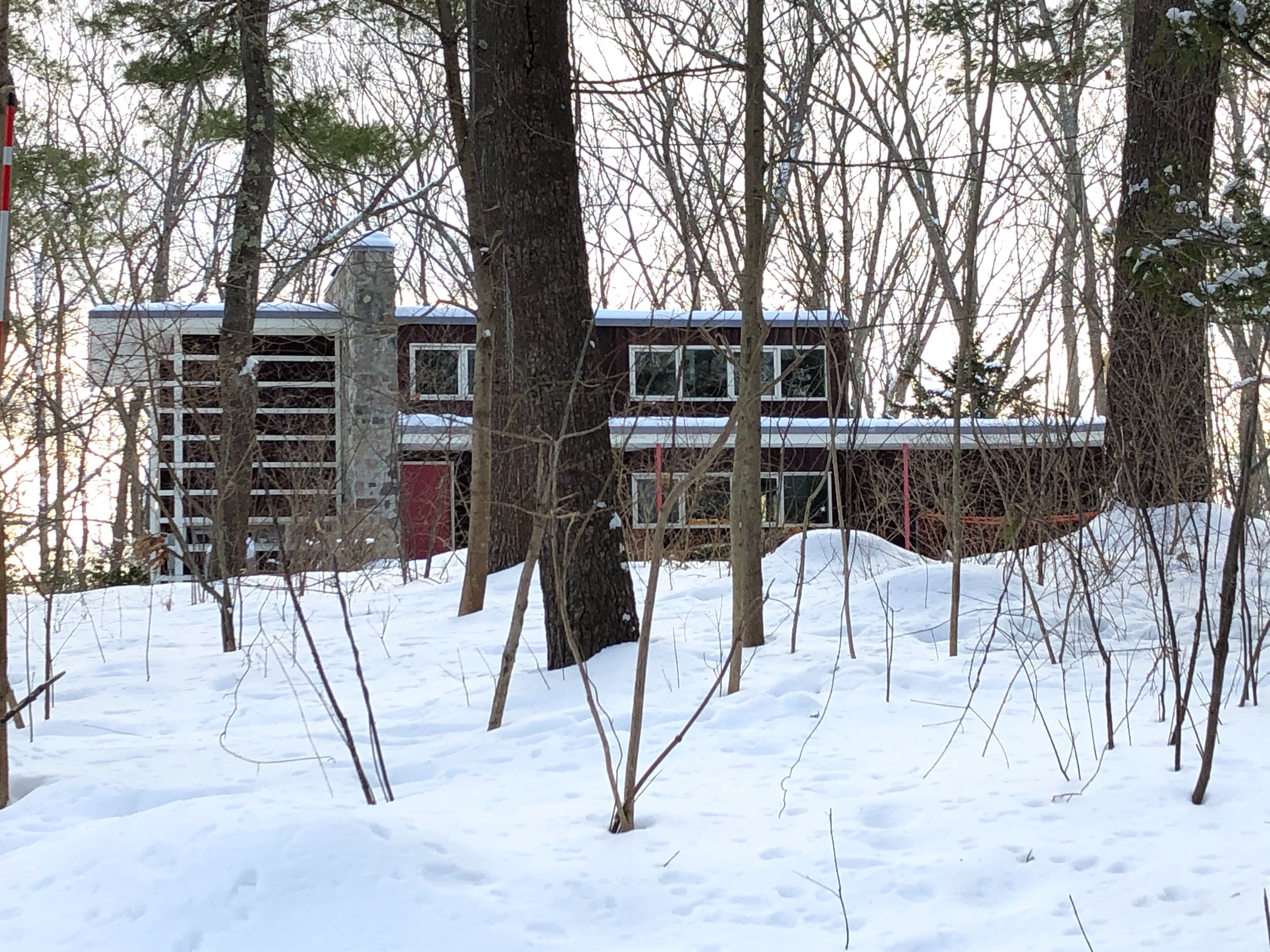
The Bogner House at 9 Woods End Road

The Walter Bogner House is located at 9 Woods End Road. It is the southernmost of the three houses on the west side of Woods End Road, just south of the Breuer House. Bogner, who designed the house himself, had wanted its design to draw attention to its modern architecture while being inexpensive. He experimented with architectural details in the house's design, and he selected specific color palettes and materials to make the house blend in with the landscape. The house is surrounded by an apple orchard.

The house is a two-story structure clad in redwood or fir planks, which are laid vertically and are coated in preservative. It has a wooden balloon frame. The house is oriented to provide natural-light exposure and privacy, facing the landscape to the south and west. The facade has steel sash windows. There are two casement windows on the northern elevation, which is otherwise windowless. The entrance is on the eastern elevation, where metal rods hold up a curving entrance marquee. Extending off the eastern elevation is a fieldstone wall with a chimney. The house also has a garage, which curves to the north, paralleling a carport. The roof is flat and is surfaced with tar and gravel.

The walls are generally made of waterproofed concrete blocks and, inside the house, are clad with plywood and wallboard. The plywood and wallboard are glued to the walls, giving them a plaster-like appearance. On the ground (first) floor, the living and dining room occupy the southern half of the house. A movable wooden screen could divide the living and dining rooms if the need arose. The kitchen occupies the northeast corner, and the maid's room (the latter of which doubled as a laundry) occupies the northwest corner of the first floor. There is a staircase to the second floor. The second floor has three bedrooms (including one for guests), a study, and a dark room. Bogner used the northeast-corner bedroom, which also served as a dressing room. On the second floor's southeast corner is an outdoor porch, adjoining the guest bedroom and directly above the living room.

=== Ford House ===
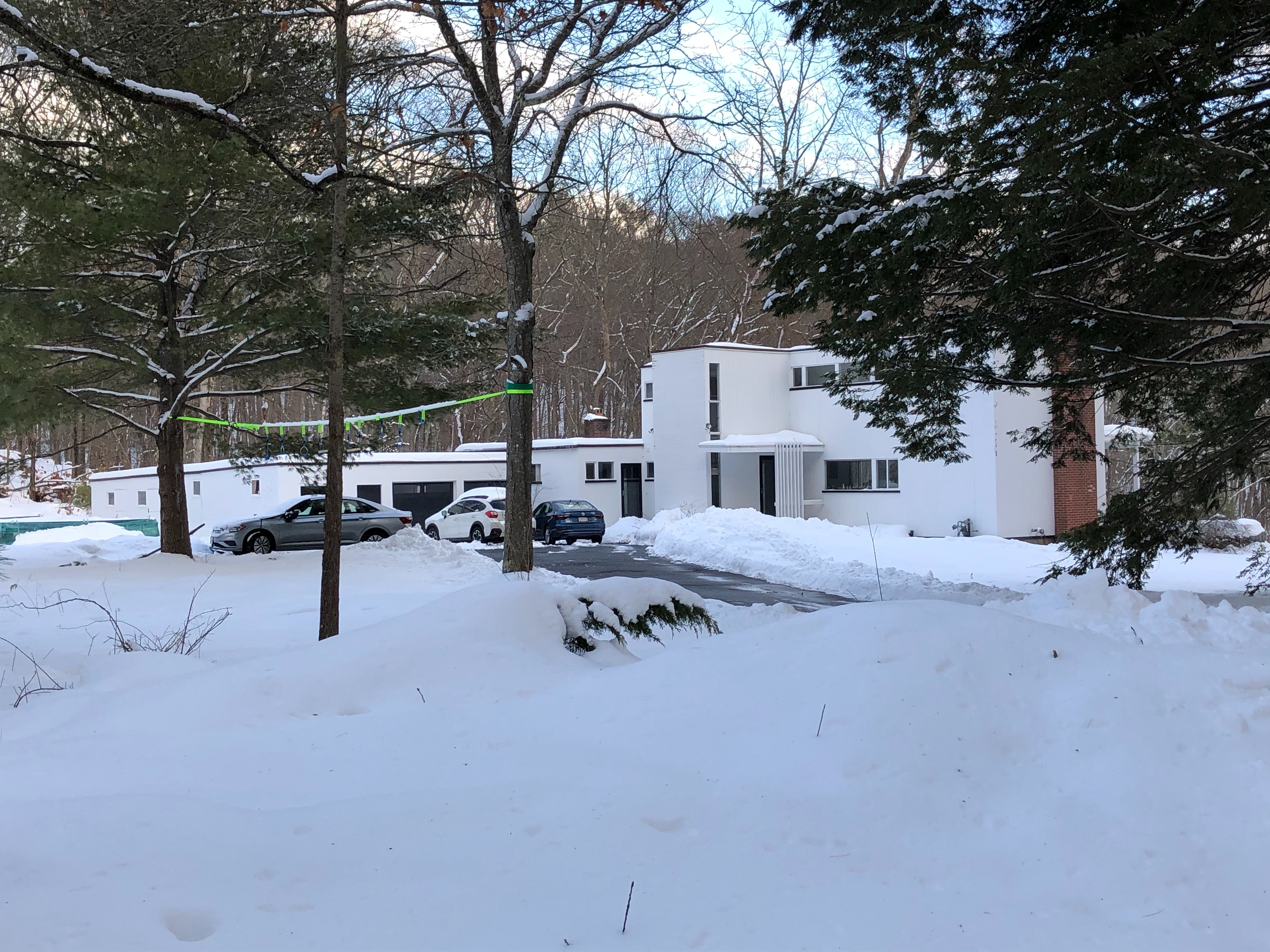
The Ford House at 10 Woods End Road

The James Ford House is located at 10 Woods End Road and was also designed by Gropius and Breuer. The house is a two-story structure with a rectangular layout. It has a foundation made of concrete blocks. The facade has interlocking tongue-and-groove wooden planks, along with a wooden frame. The northern and southern elevations have casement windows or immovable windows, while the western elevation is windowless with a brick chimney protruding from the facade. The entrance is through the western facade of a redwood-clad stair tower that projects from the northern elevation. The southern elevation of the roof has a protruding eave that acts as a screen, and there is also a retractable awning made of canvas. Landscape features outside the house include a driveway with shrubs extending to the northwest, a pond to the southeast (fed by a natural spring on the site), and a granite wall to the south.

Inside, the house has linoleum and carpeted floors, while plywood panels and plaster are used on the ceiling and walls. The house's bathrooms share a plumbing stack, and the fireplaces share the chimney. The main spaces on both stories (e.g. dining room and bedrooms) face south, while ancillary spaces such as corridors and bathrooms face north.

== History ==
=== Development ===
Walter Gropius, founder of the Bauhaus art school, moved to the United States in 1937 after he accepted a job offer from the Graduate School of Design at Harvard University in Cambridge, Massachusetts. After moving twice within Greater Boston, the Gropius family moved to Lincoln, Massachusetts, later that year. Gropius had decided to stay in that town after living there for about a year, but the Gropius family was initially unable to afford land. The family did not attempt to obtain a traditional mortgage loan, since banks were reluctant to finance highly-experimental designs.

Gropius ultimately obtained the land for his family's house from the philanthropist Helen Storrow, the widow of prominent Boston banker James J. Storrow, who lived in Boston but owned 130 acres (53 ha) as part of a country estate in South Lincoln. Storrow heard about Gropius's predicament through a mutual acquaintance, the architect Henry Shepley, who convinced her to help fund the house's construction. Storrow agreed to not only pay for the project but also rent out the land, while allowing Gropius free rein over the design of his house. Storrow offered land from her estate to four other families, three of whom were also affiliated with Harvard. One of the Harvard personnel who would ultimately move to the Storrow estate was Marcel Breuer, a Bauhaus colleague who had followed Gropius to the United States. Breuer and Gropius formed an architectural partnership by 1937, soon after both men had moved to the U.S.

Breuer and Gropius's first-ever joint design was the Gropius House, which was completed at Storrow's estate in September 1938. The Loud House, built for Storrow's friend John F. and Mary Loud, was designed the same month. The Louds were the only one of the five families who were not affiliated with Harvard. The third house was the residence of Harvard architect Walter Bogner, who expressed interest in further developing Storrow's estate in 1938. Storrow allowed Bogner to create a subdivision of seven land lots surrounding a dead-end road, which town officials approved in early 1939. The under-construction Gropius and Loud houses occupied two of these lots, while the other five were available for further development. Meanwhile, Breuer took Storrow's offer in November 1938, two months after Gropius's residence was finished. Breuer received permission to build a standalone garage in January 1939, and the Breuer House was completed that June. The other house designed by Breuer and Gropius was the Ford House, which was designed for James Ford, a Harvard professor of sociology. Work on the Ford House took place over three months and was completed in September 1939. Bogner completed his own house, at the end of Woods End Road, the same year. The other two lots remained undeveloped and were combined with the Gropius and Ford houses' sites.

=== Usage and later years ===
The completed development was similar to one that the philanthropist Amelia Peabody owned in the nearby town of Dover, Massachusetts. The five families formed a group led by Bogner. The group named the street Woods End Road (after the way the surrounding orchards blended with the woods), and they oversaw the road's maintenance. The houses, the only modern-style residences in the region, attracted widespread attention. Storrow died in 1944, and Ford died the same year. Breuer had planned to expand his house from the outset, but he never did so, and instead relocated his architectural practice to New York City in 1946. The trustees of Storrow's legal estate split up her physical estate, selling the five Woods End Road houses. The Breuer and Ford houses, which had been vacated by their original tenants before Storrow's death, each passed through several owners, who made several changes to their respective properties.

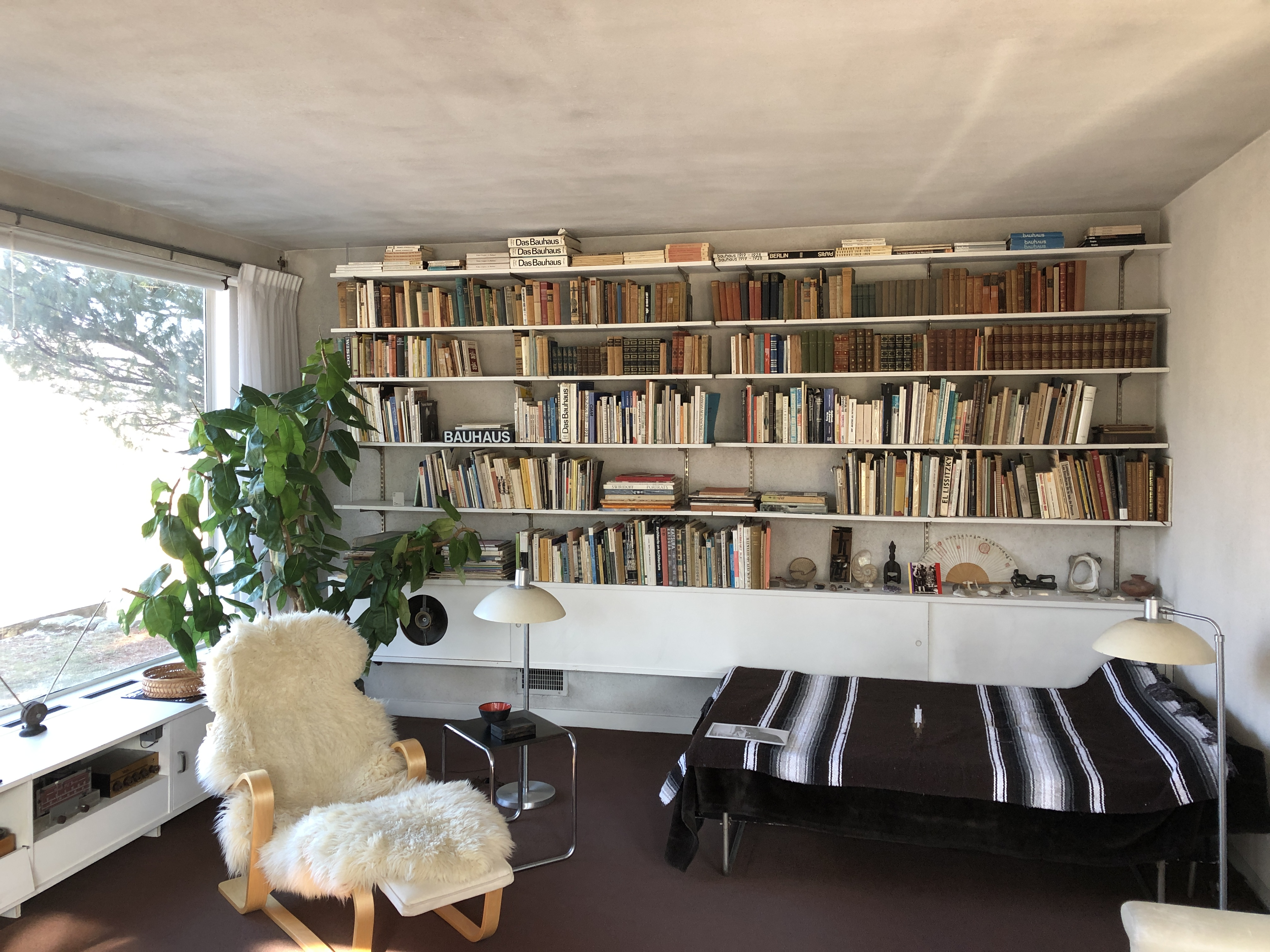
The Gropius House's living room interior, open to the public as a museum

The Loud House received a garage c. 1945. The Gropius family bought their house from the Storrow estate that year, and the Loud and Bogner families bought their respective houses in 1947. Further changes to the houses followed in the mid-20th century. The Bogner House's garage was extended in 1959, and the Ford House was expanded eastward in the 1960s. The Breuer House was expanded in the late 1960s and 1970s; during the former renovation, Breuer had written to the house's owner, describing his original plans for expanding the Breuer House.

Another cul-de-sac named Minor Street was built off Woods End Road in the 1970s; the circular turnaround at the original terminus of Wood End Road remained intact. In the mid-1970s, Walter Gropius's widow Ise donated the Gropius House to the Society for the Preservation of New England Antiquities (SPNEA; later Historic New England). After Ise's death in 1983, the house opened to the public in 1985, becoming a museum. By the late 20th century, the houses were featured on walking tours, although they were generally closed to the public, except for the Gropius House. The Loud House had been sold by the 1980s. The Bogner House, still occupied by Bogner's descendants, was the only house that remained in its original ownership.

== Impact and legacy ==
The Woods End Road houses were early examples of modernist residences in the eastern United States; previously, such houses had been confined mostly to the West Coast. George Lewis of the Harvard Graduate School of Design, who helped design the Bogner House, said that "half of the people like them very much; the others don't like them at all". The Christian Science Monitor wrote that "nowhere in New England has modern architecture sunk its roots more deeply or been seen to greater advantage" than the Storrow estate. Another article for the same newspaper said that the houses, with their unconventional designs for the time, "are no less pleasing than the efforts of many New Englanders to build modern facilities into old-type homes, often destroying the very effect of mellowed, colonial charm and simplicity dictated by tradition". The St. Louis Post-Dispatch wrote that the buildings represented "an invasion of modernity" on Storrow's estate.

The writer Ada Louise Huxtable said in 1980 that the buildings' completions "determined the course of serious building in this country from then on", and the houses also helped spur the construction of other modernist structures in Lincoln and New England. In 2026, architectural writers Alborz Dianat and Kathleen James-Chakraborty wrote that the Woods End Road development had "promoted modernism in the region as well as the architects themselves", but that it had also been a product of intense collaboration and social connections (more specifically the relationship between Shepley and Storrow). The houses' development inspired that of the later Six Moon Hill subdivision, designed by The Architects Collaborative, a later architectural partnership of Gropius's.

== See also ==
- List of Marcel Breuer works
- National Register of Historic Places listings in Middlesex County, Massachusetts
