= Gropius House =

Modernist house in Lincoln, Massachusetts

- U.S. National Register of Historic Places
- U.S. National Historic Landmark
- U.S. Historic district – Contributing property
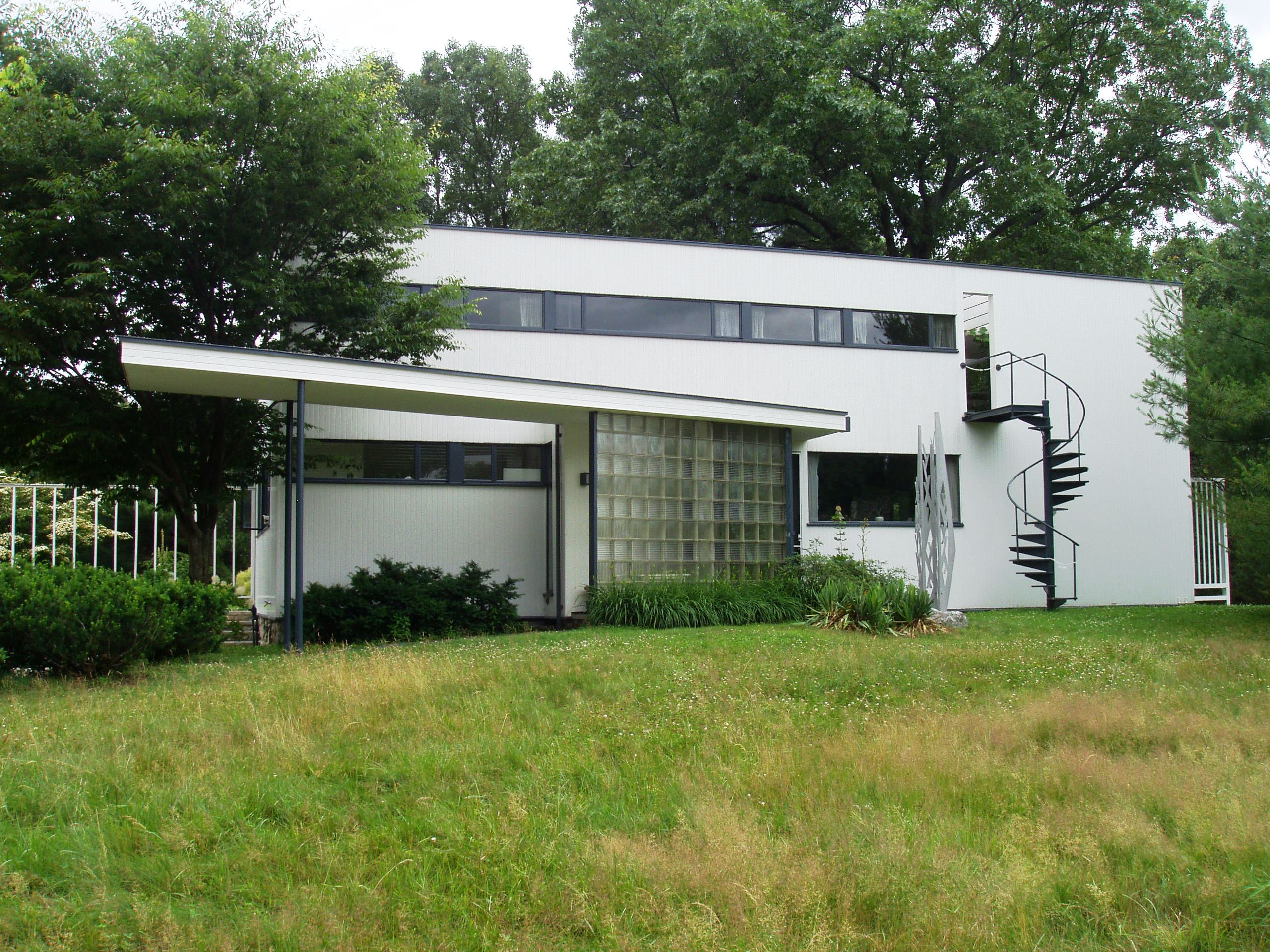
- Front view

- Location within Massachusetts Location within the United States
- Interactive map of Gropius House
- Location: 68 Baker Bridge Road, Lincoln, Massachusetts
- Coordinates: 42°25′37″N 71°19′35″W
- Area: 5.5 acres (2 ha)
- Built: 1938
- Architects: Walter Gropius, Marcel Breuer
- Architectural style: Modern
- Part of: Woods End Road Historic District (ID88000956)
- NRHP reference No.: 00000709

Significant dates
- Added to NRHP: 2000-05-16
- Designated NHL: 2000-05-16
- Designated CP: 1988-07-08

The Gropius House is a historic house museum at 68 Baker Bridge Road in Lincoln, Massachusetts, United States. Designed by Bauhaus architect Walter Gropius and his partner Marcel Breuer in the modern style, the two-story, wood-frame structure was completed in 1938. The house was originally the residence of Gropius, his wife Ise (née Frank), and their daughter Ati. It occupies the center of a hill on an approximately 5.5-acre (2.2 ha) property. Its materials and architectural details, though modernist and relatively simple, were intended to evoke similarities to other New England buildings. Operated by Historic New England since 1985, the house includes a collection of Bauhaus-related items. The design, an early example of modernist residential architecture in the eastern United States, has received extensive commentary on its juxtaposition of traditional and modernist design elements. The building is designated a National Historic Landmark and is part of the Woods End Road Historic District.

The site is extensively landscaped with retaining walls and plantings—which Gropius intended would integrate the building's architecture with the surrounding landscape—and also includes a garage. The house spans approximately 2,300 square feet (210 m^{2}), with a largely rectangular massing. The facade is made of vertical wooden planks interspersed with casement windows and sash windows. The exterior incorporates elements such as a spiral staircase, an entrance marquee, a rear porch, and protruding trellises. There is a second-story outdoor deck and a partially-enclosed flat roof. The interior spaces are grouped around a central stair hall, and they are decorated with furniture from the Gropius family's previous homes, along with objects acquired by or donated to the family. The first story has a study, living room, dining room, kitchen, pantry, and maid's room. The second story contains three bedrooms and partially overhangs the first story.

Gropius, the founder of the Bauhaus art school, fled Nazi Germany in 1934 and settled in the US in 1937. Initially, the family rented properties around Boston before deciding to construct a home in Lincoln. Gropius obtained land and financing from the philanthropist Helen Storrow. A local contractor, Casper J. Jenney, built the house between March and September 1938. The home attracted attention for its modernist design and was often used by Gropius's students and guests. Though Ati moved out during the 1940s, Walter lived at the Gropius House until his death in 1969. Ise donated the property to the Society for the Preservation of New England Antiquities (SPNEA; later Historic New England) by 1975. After Ise died in 1983, the building opened as a historic house museum on June 1, 1985, and has undergone multiple restorations since then.

== Site ==
The Gropius House is located in the Boston suburbs at 68 Baker Bridge Road in Lincoln, Massachusetts, United States, about 15 miles (24 km) from Boston itself. It was built between 1938 and 1939 by the Bauhaus architect Walter Gropius for his family. The plot overlooks wetlands to the southeast, woods to the south (behind the house), and Mounts Wachusett and Monadnock to the west; nearby trees obstruct direct views of Mount Wachusett from the house's second floor. The surrounding area is sparsely developed due to the presence of numerous preservation easements and privately-owned lands. The Gropius House and four 1930s-era houses to the west—designed by Gropius and his associates Marcel Breuer and Walter Bogner—are part of the Woods End Road Historic District. Trees are planted between the Gropius House and the Ford House, another building in that district, which neighbors the Gropius House to the southwest. The Codman House is also located nearby.

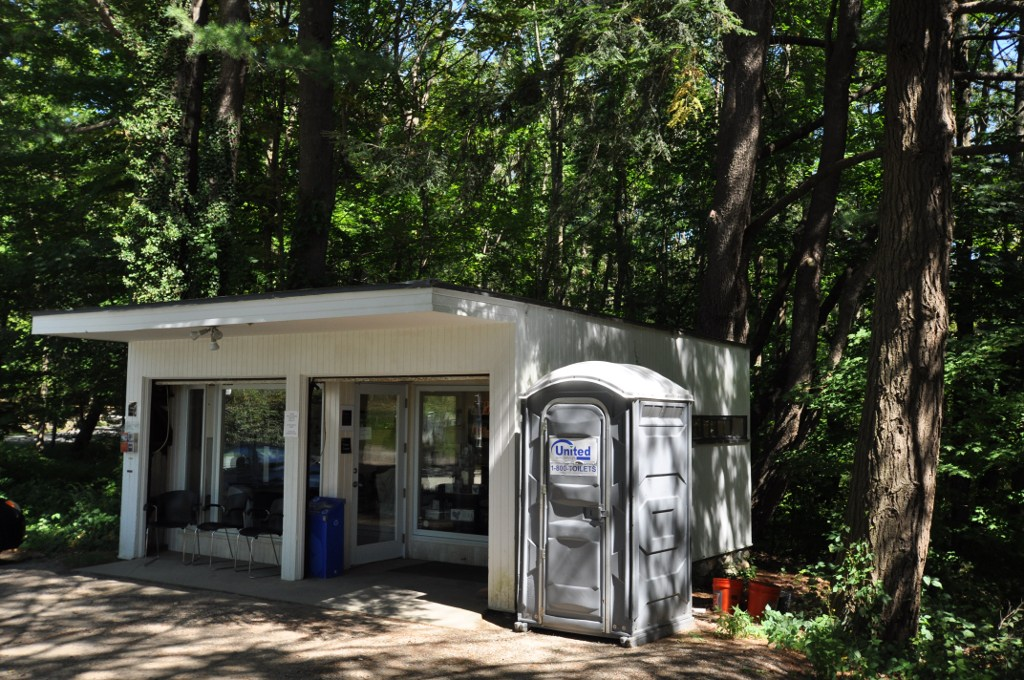
Garage on the grounds

The site covers about 5.5 acres (2.2 ha). (Note: National Park Service 2000, p. 4, gives a more precise figure of 5.51 acres (2.23 ha).) The house is situated on a hill at the center of the property; in contrast to other houses in New England, it is not oriented parallel to a lot line. A gravel driveway ascends the hill, leading to a cul-de-sac, or dead end, outside the house's entrance. A garage, later used as a visitor center, was also designed for the grounds. It was placed northeast of the house, at the bottom of the hill. The garage's location had been suggested by the previous landowner, Helen Storrow, who said a garage further up the hill would be inconvenient to access after a snowstorm. This garage can fit two cars and has a shed roof. Like the main house, the garage has a facade made of white-painted redwood. Behind the retractable garage doors are glass openings for the exhibits, gift shop, and ticket booth. When the house became a museum, a port-a-potty was placed next to the garage. By 2026, the port-a-potty was planned to be replaced with a permanent rectangular structure clad in fieldstone, facing away from the driveway.

=== Landscape design ===
Gropius carefully curated the grounds, working with his wife Ise. One writer described the house as having been planned "as an organic part of the landscape", and even the house's orientation and precise location were selected only after significant consideration. The site of the Gropius House previously included 90 apple trees, which were arranged at the base of a hill. The top of the hill was truncated when the house was built, and although some of the orchard's trees were relocated, the landscape work generally sought to minimize disturbances to the orchard. The different parts of the landscape were intended to blend into each other, and the plantings were arranged so they did not create full boundaries. Architectural features such as a protruding rear porch (see § Facade) and large windows were included to integrate the house with the landscape. This use of organic architectural design was similar to what Eleanor Raymond had done for her sister in nearby Belmont, Massachusetts. One commentator described the land around the building as an "intermediary space" linking the building to its surroundings.

Retaining walls, similar to those used elsewhere in New England, are used throughout the grounds. These walls use local material, being, as the historian Kevin Murphy put it, "of the land". The house is positioned 100 feet (30 m) behind a fieldstone retaining wall along Baker Bridge Road to the north, which predates the building's construction. Another preexisting retaining wall to the south also remains in place. When the house was built, Gropius added flagstone retaining walls to the west and south, topped with mortar to make it easier to mow. To the east, a bench was added onto part of an existing retaining wall. The retaining walls are not all connected to each other. At the perimeter of the property, the landscape blends in with the plantings surrounding it.

Some parts of the site were excavated, then planted with grass. The grass near the house was cut short, but grass further out was allowed to grow taller. Different plantings were selected for different architectural elements. For example, the entrance has yucca and daylilies; the house's trellises have pink roses; and vertical design elements have American bittersweets and Concord grapevines. The rear porch divides the lawn into two sections of 50 by 25 feet (15.2 by 7.6 m) each. There is an oak tree west of the house; it was placed on axis with the building's chimney and a column at one of the building's corners, visually creating a colonnade. Just south of the porch is a pair of columns, which virtually "framed" the landscape as seen from the porch. After a trip to Japan in the 1950s, Ise removed the perennials and covered the ground in a layer of gravel, where she planted azaleas, candytuft, cotoneaster, and one large red-leafed Japanese maple tree.

== Architecture ==
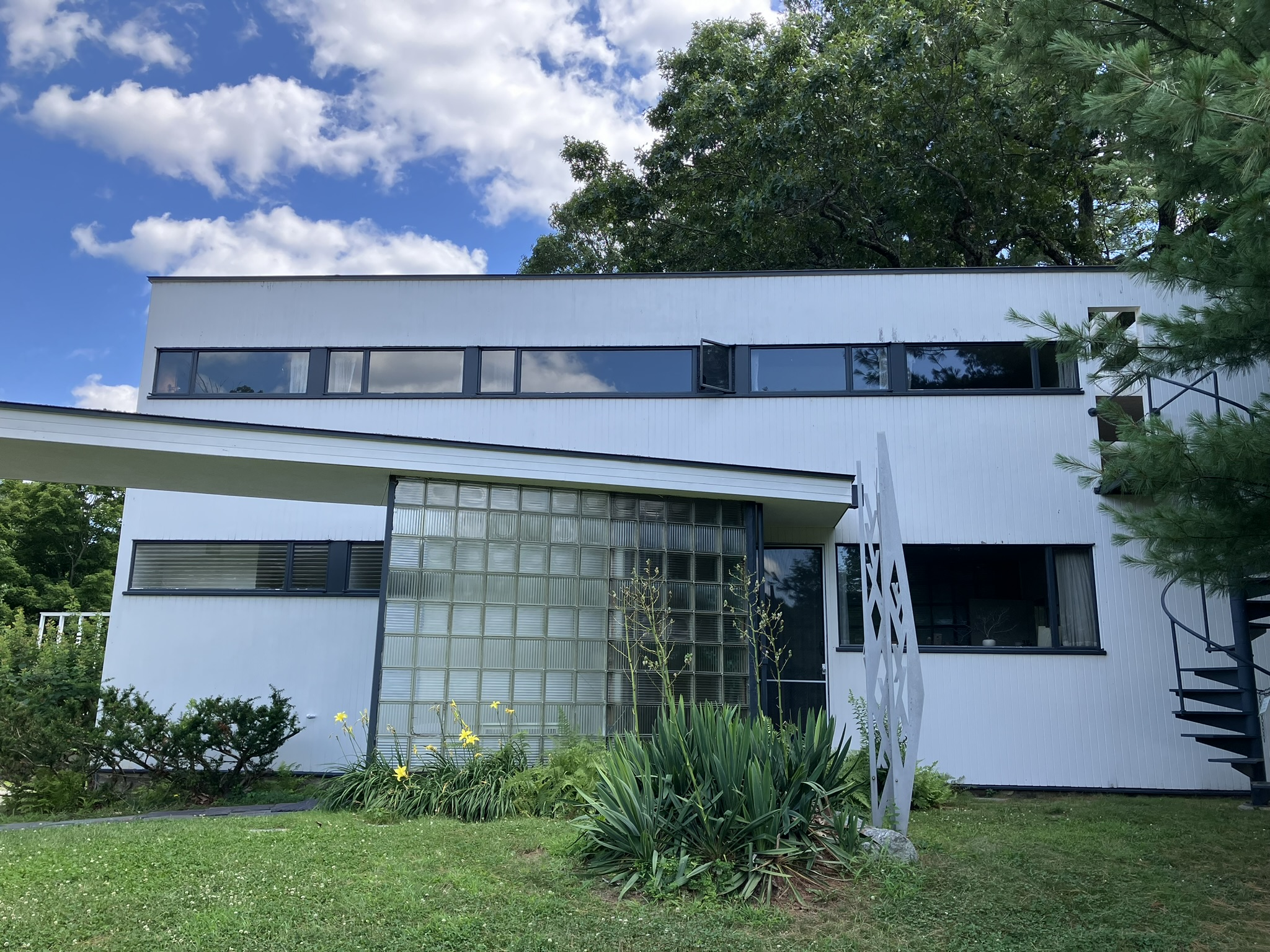
View of the front (north) elevation

Walter Gropius and Marcel Breuer's architectural partnership designed the house for Gropius's family in a modern style. It was the first structure ever completed by their firm and the first project Gropius designed in the U.S. Breuer, despite being significantly involved in the design, did not take credit for it. Gropius's wife Ise and daughter Ati suggested many elements that were used in the final design, such as the exterior spiral staircase; because of their exacting requirements, Gropius called them "the toughest customers" he had ever had. In keeping with Gropius's Bauhaus design philosophy, the plans and materials were relatively simple. The design was made as functional as possible, incorporating no purely-esthetic elements, and Gropius even avoided excessive color because he thought it was ostentatious. The house's architecture was also intended to take advantage of the views, along with the shadows cast by the nearby trees.

The house uses a hybrid of traditional and modern principles and materials. It incorporates Bauhaus design elements and principles extensively, such as strip windows and free-flowing interior spaces. Other design elements such as the porch, along with materials such as the wood facade, were commonplace in the vernacular architecture of New England; Gropius hoped the use of these details would make the Bauhaus movement more acceptable to the American public. Traditional materials, such as wood, brick, and fieldstone, were used alongside more modern industrial materials, such as glass block, acoustic plaster, welded steel, and chrome banisters. Gropius later said he had been inspired by the design and planning of New England towns, saying, "They had a conception of a totality: a [town] common in the center and every house a little bit different." To save money, and to demonstrate that regular Americans could construct similarly-distinctive designs, Gropius constructed his house almost entirely of materials and fixtures that were readily available in stores or in catalogs; many of these items were made in factories or were more suitable for industrial settings. Only the interior stair's rail and outdoor lighting were custom-made. The architectural writer Robert Campbell said the use of readily-available materials was intended to make it "free from ego", as though it were assembled rather than designed.

The arrangement and design details are more akin to European precedents, including an asymmetrical Bauhaus building Gropius and Breuer had designed in 1926. They bear close similarities to an idealistic house Gropius had written about in a 1931 article for Architectural Forum magazine. In that article, he proposed a dwelling of "light construction", with a free-flowing interior in which rooms were positioned according to their function. Gropius had believed that buildings should not conform to "artificial symmetry", and other Bauhaus buildings had generally been designed without symmetry in mind. The exterior materials, as well, conformed with the principles that Gropius had espoused in the 1931 article. The design was also adapted to New England's climate; for example, the materials and layout were intended to allow the house to be passively heated during the winter. The house's wood frame was intended to pay homage to New England's older architecture. The Gropius House thus contrasted with other modernist buildings, which were often steel or concrete-framed, and with other buildings in Gropius's native Germany, which were frequently made of brick.

As to my practice, when I built my first house in the U.S.A.—which was my own—I made it a point to absorb into my own conception those features of the New England architectural tradition that I found still alive and adequate. This fusion of the regional spirit with a contemporary approach to design produced a house that I would never have built in Europe with its entirely different climatic, technical and psychological background.

— Walter Gropius, Scope of Total Architecture (1956)

=== Exterior ===
The house is two stories high and has a largely rectangular massing, or general shape. The house sits on a stone foundation. The wooden frame is concealed behind vertically-oriented redwood planks, which are painted white. The planks were used because they were inexpensive, and both the material and paint color were intended to fit in with older, Colonial-style buildings nearby. The planks measured 7/8 by 3 3/4 inches (22 by 95 mm) across, with bevels at the planks' edges, and are laid very closely together. The planks are covered with a primer and overlaid by a semi-gloss finish; both oil and white lead are used for the primer and finish. Exposed metalwork was coated with a red-lead primer, while the exterior trim has an aluminum primer. The exterior was illuminated exclusively by indirect lighting, consisting of spotlights facing the entrance and the grounds behind. Gropius interrupted the flat surface of the facade with protruding architectural details such as an entrance marquee, trellises, and a spiral staircase. Exterior doors on opposite elevations of the facade were arranged to allow better cross-ventilation during the summer. The west and south elevations are more complex than the others, with protruding and recessed sections. In contrast to the modernist buildings it inspired, the Gropius House did not include oversized design elements.

Black trim was used around the windows, which are much larger than in other New England houses. The facade has both movable casement windows and fixed-in-place sash windows, which are oriented horizontally. On the north (front) elevation, which faces the road, narrow windows are used for privacy and to limit sunlight exposure. The other elevations have larger windows; one source described the design as having "more windows in the house than walls". The windows' metal frames are covered in gray paint, applied over layers of linseed oil and red lead. The window sills measure 4 by 8 inches (100 by 200 mm) across. The windows are generally composed of 1/4-inch (6.4 mm) panes of what Ise Gropius described as "pull glass". The dining and living room windows use plate glass, which measure 1/4 inch (6.4 mm) thick, 6 feet (1.8 m) high and over 10 feet (3.0 m) wide. The lintels of the plate-glass windows have steel I-beams. Gropius also used horizontally-oriented ribbed glass in the pantry, along with fluted glass, which was laid vertically near the first-floor entrance and horizontally near the bathrooms. These types of glass were intended to emphasize the design's linear nature. The windows also allowed solar heat to penetrate the interior.

==== Facade ====
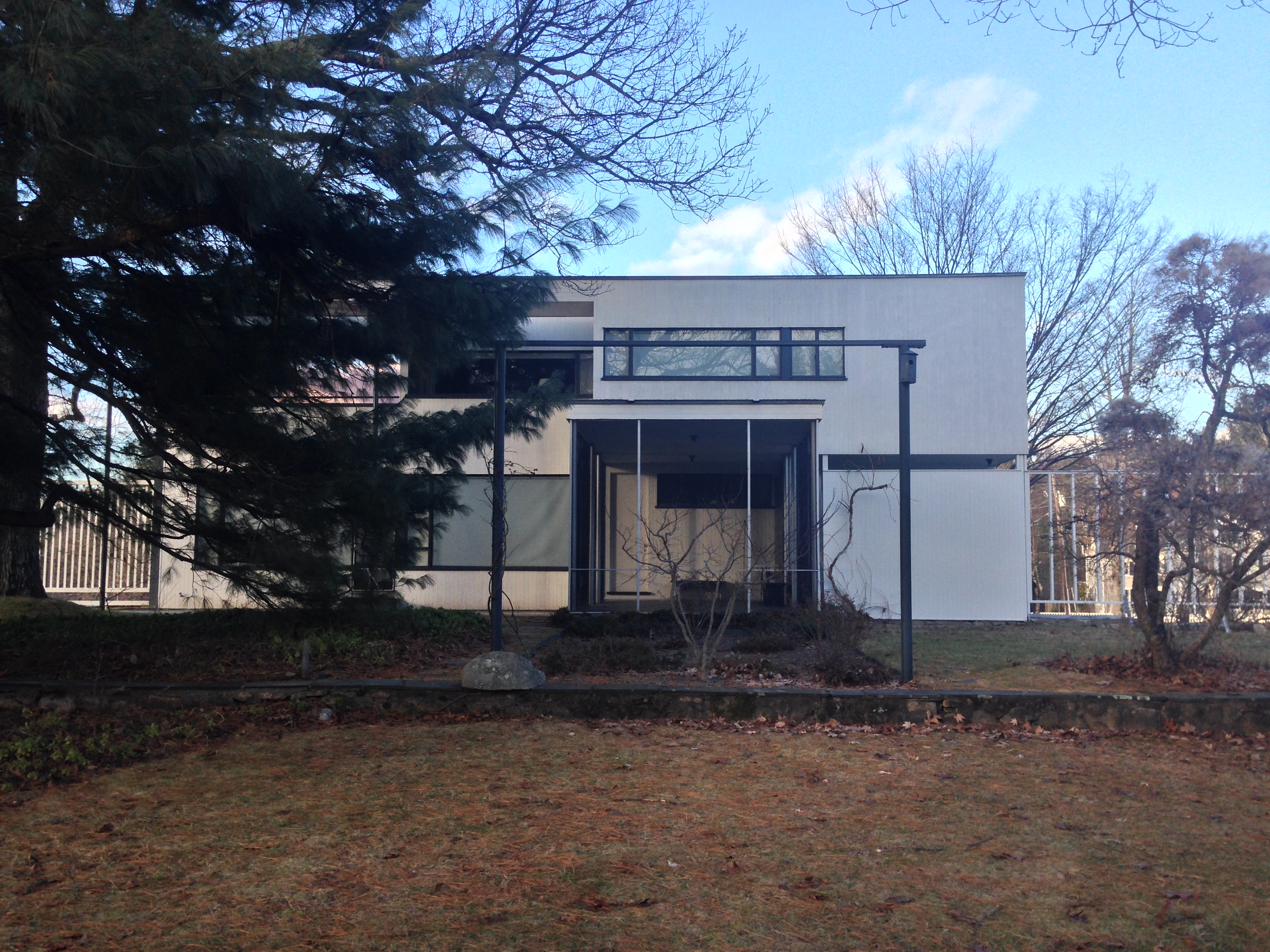
The southern elevation of the facade, facing the porch

Each elevation of the facade has different details. The north (front) elevation has two contrasting design elements: a protruding entrance marquee and a spiral staircase. The flat marquee protrudes at a 30-degree angle, sheltering the entrance without blocking views from the first floor's northern elevation. Gropius oriented the marquee so it pointed east toward the driveway. The outer edge of this marquee is supported by a pair of steel poles. Closer to the entrance, there is a wall made of glass blocks, which continue indoors, forming the entrance vestibule's northern wall. The glass blocks each measure about 1 foot (0.30 m) square. The wall was intended to create a "volume without solidity", as was common in Bauhaus buildings, while also simultaneously illuminating the entrance and providing privacy. The underside of the marquee likely originally had a stucco finish.

The spiral staircase at the western end of the north elevation, made of cast iron or steel, leads to an outdoor deck on the second floor. The staircase was built so Ati and her friends could access her second-floor bedroom without disturbing other members of the family. One writer said in 1992 that the staircase "bears witness that there is little need to fear burglars in New England". The deck, at the second floor's western end, measures 21 by 14 feet (6.4 by 4.3 m) across. Walter had created the second-floor deck after Ati requested a room with a sand floor and glass ceiling so she could sleep under the stars. A glass door leads inside to Ati's second-floor bedroom. The second-floor deck is screened by a parapet.

A pair of trellises protrude from the side elevations. The east elevation, which abuts the service spaces and the driveway, is rectangular and has asymmetrical fenestration. The eastern windows were supposed to be smaller, but Gropius enlarged these windows at the request of his family members. A small staircase on the east elevation—which is made of reinforced concrete with embedded, irregularly-shaped flagstone fragments—leads to the kitchen. The west elevation has a brick chimney, which was originally painted white but by 2000 was characterized as gray. This chimney has stainless-steel lining and protrudes slightly above the roofline. The lower portion of the west elevation has a large living-room window, while the upper portion is recessed from the second-floor deck.

The south elevation's second floor protrudes above the garden at its eastern end. The south elevation has large windows shielded by brises soleil or sun shades, which are attached to the exterior joists. The aluminum brises soleil, which could be adjusted from inside the house, absorbed solar heat before it reached the glass. Extending perpendicularly off the south elevation is a screen porch, which Gropius intended would visually connect the house with the landscape. Measuring 11 1/2 by 23 feet (3.5 by 7.0 m) across, the porch has galvanized steel screens, copper nets, a concrete floor with embedded bluestone slabs, and a vermiculite plaster ceiling supported by posts. It could be used as another living space during the summer, while the furniture there was swapped out for a ping-pong table in winter. Although many New England homes had front porches, Gropius decided to place the porch in the rear because, in his mind, the growing popularity of automobiles had made front porches undesirable.

==== Roof ====
Gropius designed the house with a flat roof. He had believed such a design was easier to maintain than conventional sloping roofs, which were vulnerable to crosswinds, and would increase usable space by eliminating the need for low, sloping attics. When the house was built, flat roofs were still uncommon in the area, although they had gained favor in Europe and parts of the United States. The flat roof is paved in gravel and tar and is surrounded by a parapet with a railing. At the middle of the deck, a drain collects water and sends it through the house, where water is collected in a basin. The drain was heated by the house itself, preventing the pipe from freezing over during the winter. The center of the roof descends slightly toward the drain, allowing the house to be built without rain gutters.

The roof has a space enclosed by walls on the east and north. After the house was completed, the roof's north wall was painted pink, contrasting with the white facade and providing a canvas for Bauhaus artists who displayed their work there. Part of the roof protrudes from the south elevation and contains slat-like openings in the manner of brises soleil. The protruding roof, attributed to Breuer, is designed to admit the sun in winter (when the sun is lower in the sky) while shading the rooms in summer. The presence of the protruding roof reduced the need for air-conditioning during the summer.

=== Interior ===
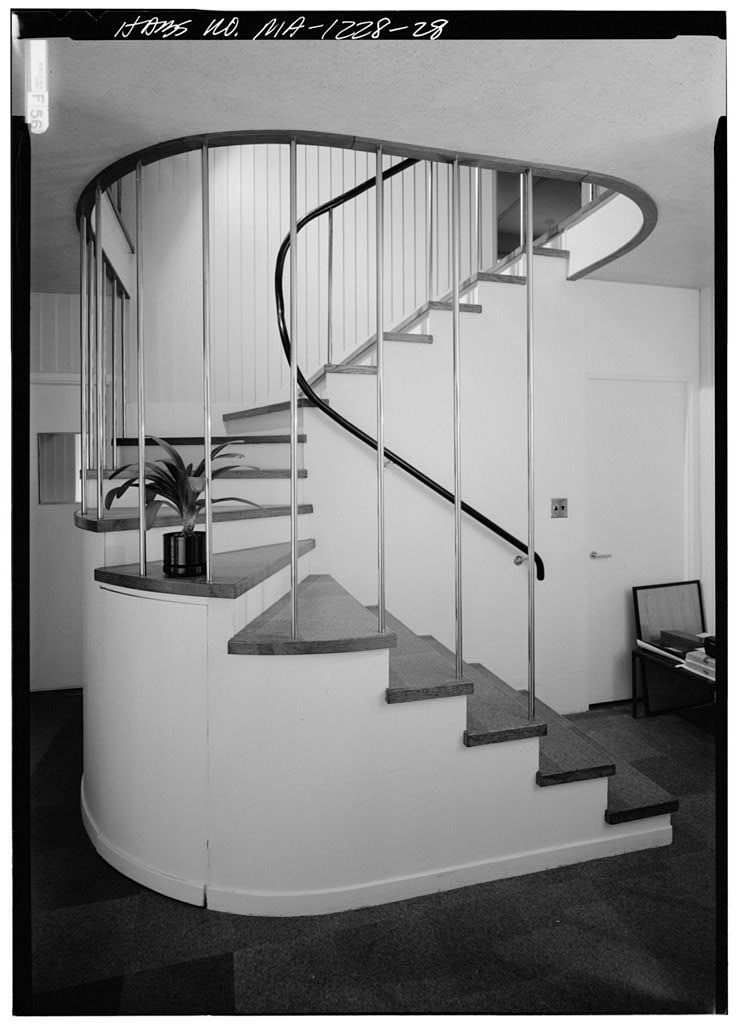
Central staircase, with custom curved balustrade

The Gropius House covers 2,300 square feet (210 m^{2}). The ground floor's area is similar in scale to older colonial-style buildings, with a north–south width of 21 3/4 feet (6.6 m) and a west–east length of 54 2/3 feet (16.7 m). The second floor has a greater north–south width, with its eastern section partially overhanging the facade, but has a reduced west–east length because of the outdoor deck on the western end. Subsequent commentators described the house's compactness as contrasting with the large impact the house had had on modern architecture.

==== Structural features and materials ====
The wooden superstructure is mostly designed as a balloon frame, a technology with which Gropius and Breuer were experimenting while designing the Woods End Road houses. Some of the larger elements are inspired by those of older timber frame buildings in New England, and the framework also incorporates the brick chimney. The wood in the frame is made of Douglas fir and yellow pine. Horizontal and vertical features are connected by diagonal bracing. Structural elements include wall studs measuring 2 by 4 inches (51 by 102 mm), joists measuring 2 by 10 inches (51 by 254 mm), and corner piers measuring 4 by 6 inches (100 by 150 mm) across. The house has partitions made of Douglas fir; load-bearing partitions use thicker planks than non-load-bearing partitions. Steel I-beams with fir strips span the ceilings above the first floor, and the walls contain iron anchors supporting the frame's beams and rafters.

The doors in the house are made of glass or wood and all measure 1 3/4 inches (44 mm) thick. The ceilings and the bathroom walls are built of metal lath, while other spaces have gypsum lath, both covered with gypsum plaster. The original specifications called for the interior spaces to be covered in a variety of finishes, including white pine clapboard, rubber bathroom tiles, wallpaper, paint (on ceilings), and semi-gloss finish. In practice, many of the interior design details were changed prior to or during construction. For instance, the living spaces received acoustic plaster finishes, which were sprayed onto gypsum plaster and had a coarse texture. Although this material was innovative yet easy to obtain when the house was built in the 1930s, it was no longer commercially available by the 1970s. Wallpaper was used in fewer rooms than originally anticipated, and the bathrooms used ceramic tiles. Over the years, rooms were repainted repeatedly. In spaces such as the dining room, Gropius experimented with paint, creating illusions such as receding door frames.

As with the exterior, indirect light fixtures are used inside. Three climate-control systems are installed: one each for the air-conditioning system, the windowsills, and the bathrooms. The windowsills' heating system includes convection heaters and warm-water pipes, allowing the house to remain warm during the winter. Since the Gropius family preferred to sleep in the cold, the bathrooms' heating system kept these rooms warm if the house's other heating systems were deactivated at night. The dressing room and master bedroom could be heated separately.

==== Interior spaces ====
Like many New England buildings, the house has a central stair hall, which spans both levels. The layout reduced the need for hallways, since the rooms could be reached from the central hall. Features such as large windows and glass-block walls contributed to what The Christian Science Monitor called "the feeling of fluid spaciousness", though The New York Times described the rooms as still being "compartmentalized", with clear divisions between most of the rooms. The living spaces are generally oriented toward the south to optimize their exposure to sunlight. Service rooms, specifically the maid's bedroom, pantry, and kitchen, were kept separate from the other rooms. The house includes three bedrooms, which are placed upstairs. There are also three and a half bathrooms, which are placed one above the other and use the same plumbing stack. Most of the space under the first floor is crawl space, but the central hallway and kitchen have a cellar beneath. This cellar could be used for clothing storage.

The furnishings are generally in the Modern style. Very few pieces of built-in furniture were constructed in the house. Instead, the interiors were outfitted with furnishings from the Gropius family's previous houses in Europe and from the Bauhaus workshops in Dessau, Germany. Some of these pieces of furniture had been made by Gropius's Bauhaus students and colleagues. Upholstery and paint colors were generally in various shades of off-white, gray, and beige. The furniture was made of chrome, plastic, or wood. Other objects were acquired based on their appearance and whether they looked. Two pieces of furniture were built with Cafolite resin countertops, (Note: Spelled as "Caffelite" in National Park Service 2000, p. 8.) since the Gropius family's first meal in the U.S. had taken place at New York City's Grand Central Oyster Bar, whose countertops were made of the same material. Gropius acquired many pieces of furniture for the house, eventually amassing 1,670 objects. Several pieces of contemporary-styled furniture were donated to the Gropius family, including a "womb chair" by Eero Saarinen, an Isokon Long Chair, an Isokon magazine rack, and two stools designed by Sori Yanagi. The Gropius House has more Bauhaus furniture than any other individual structure outside Germany.

The interiors were also filled with artwork collected by the Gropius family. The artwork tended to come from Gropius's colleagues at the Bauhaus or his students' firm The Architects Collaborative. Over the years, the family amassed work from such artists as Josef Albers, Henry Moore, László Moholy-Nagy, Joan Miró, and Herbert Bayer. They also collected various pieces of bric-à-brac, like rocks and seashells. Japanese objects, images of sculptures, and house plants were displayed inside as well, along with items such as a vase by Alvar Aalto. These objects were placed in particular locations to avoid giving the impression of clutter. To make it easier to clean the house, picture frames were kept to a minimum, and carpets covered the floor of entire rooms; Ise claimed that the entire house could be cleaned in two hours.

===== Central hall =====
The central stair hall has cork tile floors; the modern cork floors, dating from the late 1980s, are made of 12-by-12-inch (300 by 300 mm) tiles. The original specifications called for wood, rather than cork, to be used in the stair hall's floors. The middle of the stair hall has a curving staircase connecting the first and second floors. The staircase has a metal-pipe railing supported by chrome balusters, along with cork treads. The stair hall has walls made of vertically-laid wood planks, the use of which alluded to the material used on older New England buildings' facades. Canvas coverings were placed on the wall where it curved to accommodate the stair. Light from the entrance's glass-block wall continues into the central hall.

A coatroom area is incorporated into the first floor of the central hall; this contrasted with other houses' coatrooms, which were physically separate spaces. The presence of the open coatroom gave the hall a more spacious ambiance, and the varying appearances of the coats through the seasons created what was sometimes described as a dramatic or sculptural feel. The coatroom has an oak-veneered wall and illuminated by a fluted glass wall next to the entrance. On the second level, there is an alcove in the stair hall, with a curtain that can conceal linen storage and a sewing machine. A plastic drawing by Josef Albers, given to Gropius as a birthday gift in 1949, hangs in the upper portion of the hall.

===== First floor =====
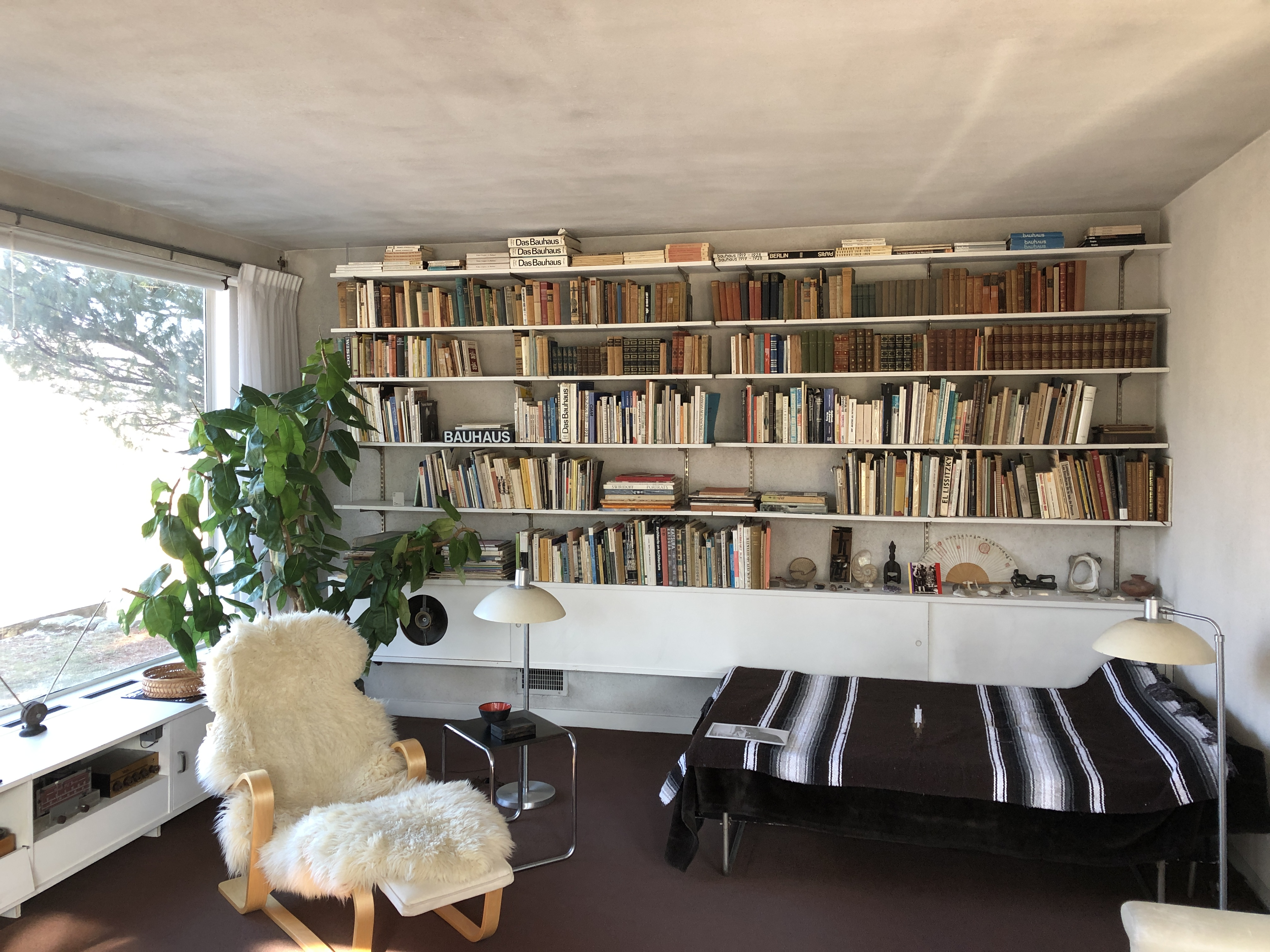
The north wall of the living room, with a daybed

On the first floor west of the central hall is the study. The north wall of this room has a Bauhaus double desk designed by Breuer, which was used by both Walter and Ise. Above the desk is a window with silk curtains drawn across it. On the south side of the study is a glass-block wall, which curves slightly outward, separating it from the dining room. The glass-block wall provides these rooms with privacy, while also allowing light from both sides to penetrate both rooms. The study, along with the adjoining dining and living rooms, have acoustical plaster walls and ceilings, in addition to white-oak bookshelves.

The living room measures 14 1/2 by 21 feet (4.4 by 6.4 m) and is located at the western end of the house. The living room has a fireplace without a mantel, which was installed both as a backup heating source and for what Gropius described as psychological purposes. Above the fireplace hung a plexiglass painting by Moholy-Nagy. On the north side of the living room are shelves. Gropius sometimes worked on a daybed next to the shelves, which was furnished with a heavy fabric covering. The living room originally had a rug; two divans and a sofa, all with brown upholstery; and a laminated-wood chaise longue and retractable tubular-steel tables, all made by Breuer. Artwork in the living room included a bronze replica of the Dimitri Hadzi sculpture Thermopylae installed outside Boston's John F. Kennedy Federal Building, along with a kite from one of Gropius's students.

Just south of the study, and east of the living room, is the dining room, which measures 13 1/2 by 11 feet (4.1 by 3.4 m) across. The two rooms are interconnected to form an "L" shape, separated by a movable curtain. The spaces receive natural light from full-height windows along the living room's western wall and both rooms' southern walls, along with glass doors. The glass doors and large windows were intended to give the impression that the indoor and outdoor spaces were integrated with each other, and they could be covered by curtains. The dining room has tubular-steel chairs and a ivory-topped round table designed by Bauhaus associates, (Note: The dining table is attributed to Gustav Hussenpflug, one of Gropius's Bauhaus students, while the chairs are attributed to Breuer.) the latter of which has a metal "Lazy Susan" or food turntable. It also has a buffet with chrome legs supporting a Cafolite resin countertop, which is placed along the curved north wall. A ceiling lamp provides indirect lighting, with a filter preventing light from shining into occupants' eyes.

The kitchen and the adjoining pantry are relatively compact spaces, located south of the central hall and east of the dining room. These two spaces have a corridor-like floor plan, similar to Frank Lloyd Wright's later Zimmerman House in Manchester, New Hampshire. The kitchen and pantry have waxed and polished linoleum floors, along with cabinets made of white-glazed metal. The original garbage disposal unit and dishwasher were novel at the time of the house's construction and were donated by General Electric as product placement for advertising purposes. Inside the pantry cabinets were utensils with uncommon designs (such as gold-rimmed wine glasses and several sizes of petri dishes for eating), which were family heirlooms. The original kitchen appliances have since been replaced. The kitchen originally had pink ceilings, later painted over. The maid's room was at the house's northeast corner, with parquet floors. The maid's room had its own attached bathroom and was used as a guest room after 1941. The southern porch could be accessed from the pantry.

===== Second floor =====
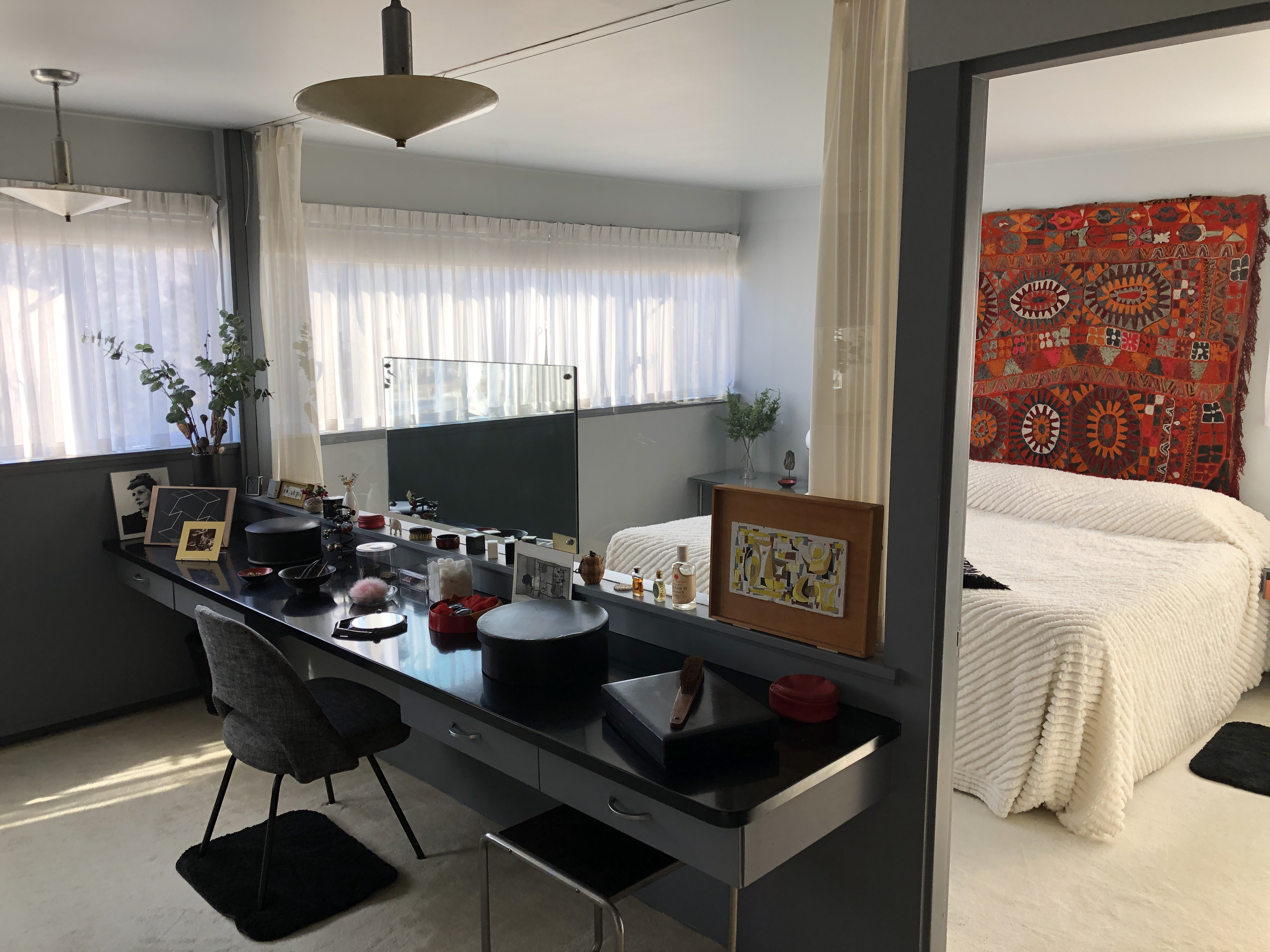
Master bedroom

The second floor has three bedrooms, one of which is a master suite. All the bedroom closets have white-pine shelves, and all the beds were designed to resemble daybeds. The south end of the second floor has a guest bedroom, which has two beds laid back-to-back, along with a desk. The back-to-back beds may have been installed to deter long-term guests. This room may have originally been painted a pale yellow. The guest bedroom originally had a cotton carpet, along with black mats in front of each bed. Miró designed silk screens for the guest bedroom, which depict murals at the UNESCO Headquarters and the Harvard Graduate Center.

Ati's bedroom occupies the western end of the second floor, next to the deck, and has an alcove with a curtain along its northern wall. It has a desk from the Bauhaus office in Germany, and originally was furnished with a divan, chair, and colorful "dainty" curtains. Both the guest bedroom and Ati's bedroom have horizontally-oriented, 3-foot-high (0.91 m) windows on their south walls.

The master bedroom suite on the western end of the second floor. It has windows on its south and east walls, along with wooden battens laid vertically along the west wall, from which objects could be displayed. The walls originally had brown carpets and a "neutral linen" wallpaper. Ise and Ati Gropius both characterized the master suite as having a gray hue, but subsequent studies found that the wall coverings in these rooms were beige or red-brown. Both rooms were repainted gray by the 1960s. Ati said her father had used a dark palette and reduced illumination for the master suite because he had personally preferred darker hues. The master bedroom and its dressing room are separated by a glass partition, measuring 4.5 by 9.5 feet (1.4 by 2.9 m) across. The dressing room has a table with a Cafolite surface, and a mirror is placed on the partition above the table. Closets and a bedroom extend off the dressing room. Open-mesh curtains originally were hung over the exterior windows, while homespun curtains could be drawn over the glass partition.

== History ==
=== Development ===
Walter Gropius established the Bauhaus art school in Weimar, Germany, in 1919, and led the school for nine years, overseeing its 1925 relocation to Dessau. Walter, his wife Ise, and their daughter Ati fled Nazi Germany for the United Kingdom in 1934. They relocated again to the United States in March 1937 after Gropius accepted a job offer from the Graduate School of Design at Harvard University in Cambridge, Massachusetts. After experiencing what Ise described as the overwhelming "hospitality of the Bostonian and Harvard circles", the Gropius family decided on a respite in Cape Cod that July. The family moved to Sandy Pond Road in Lincoln, Massachusetts, later that year. Ise recalled, "We had gone around here everywhere, and we liked Lincoln best", saying that they had been attracted by the landscape. Their first house in Lincoln was the Smith-Cole-Stearns House, a white clapboard building dating from 1791. Gropius was among the first of ten modernist architects who moved to Lincoln over two decades in the mid-20th century.

==== Storrow offer ====
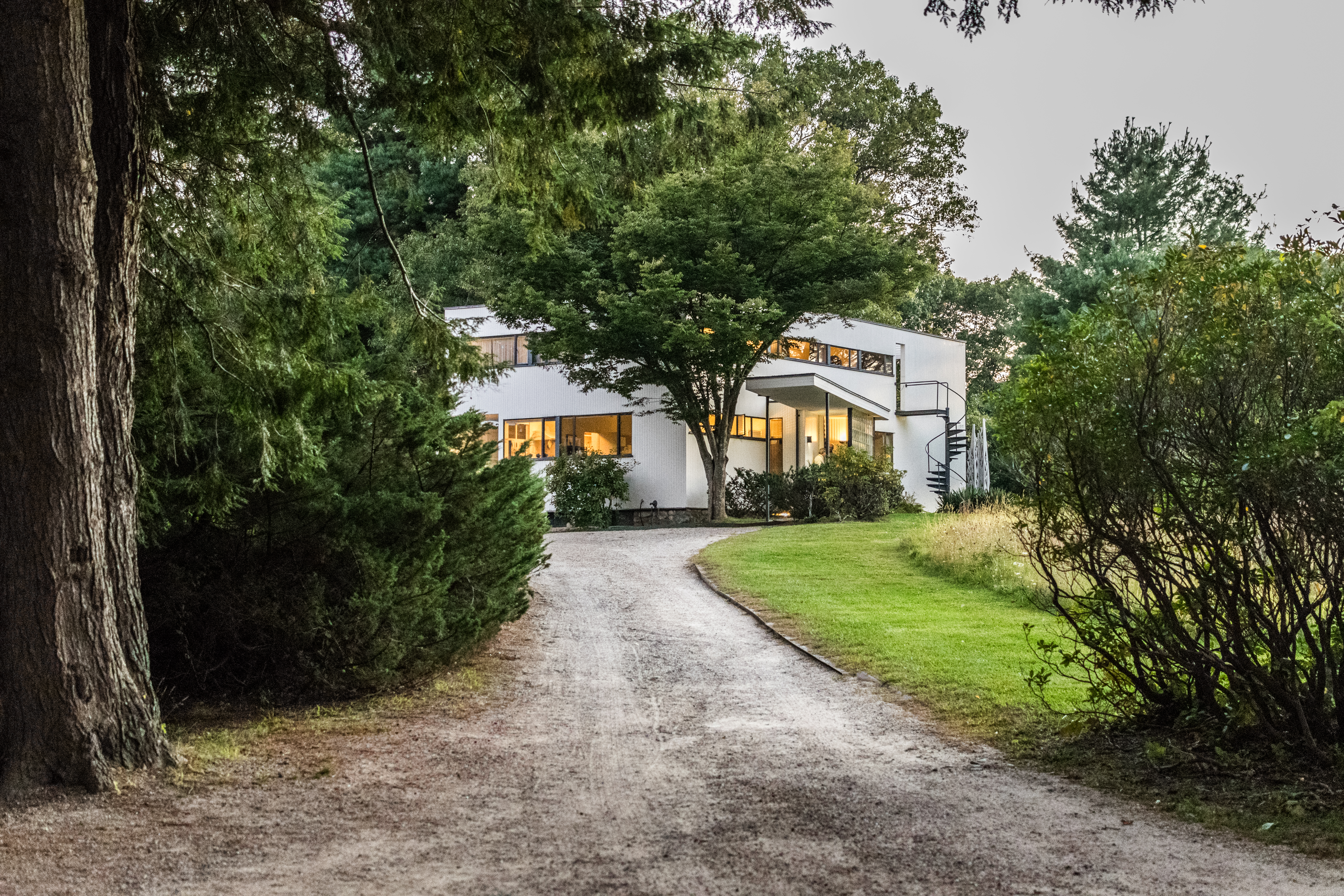
The house seen from its driveway

In the long run, Gropius wanted to build a house for his family in Lincoln. Walter had decided to stay in that town after living there for about a year, saying the countryside offered "fresh optimism and boldness, and last but not least the dry clear air with its stimulating electricity". However, the Gropius family was initially unable to afford land. The family did not attempt to obtain a traditional mortgage loan, since banks were reluctant to finance highly-experimental designs. Walter ultimately obtained the land for his family's house from the philanthropist Helen Storrow, the widow of prominent Boston banker James J. Storrow, who lived in Boston but owned 130 acres (53 ha) as part of a country estate in South Lincoln. Storrow heard about Gropius's predicament through a mutual acquaintance, the architect Henry Shepley, who convinced her to help fund the house's construction.

Storrow agreed to not only pay for the project but also rent out the land, while allowing Gropius free rein over the design of his house. Though Storrow was either uninterested in, or not knowledgeable, of modern architecture, she was willing to give Walter "a chance to show what he could do best", a courtesy Storrow believed should be extended to other immigrants. The Gropius family agreed to pay Storrow 6% of the project's cost annually until they bought the land. Storrow also asked that the residence be "in the best of the New England architecture tradition", to which Walter said yes. Storrow offered land from her estate to four other families, three of whom were also affiliated with Harvard. One of the Harvard personnel who took Storrow's offer was Marcel Breuer, a Bauhaus colleague who had followed Gropius to the United States.

==== Design and construction ====
The Gropius family traveled all over New England to study American colonial houses, which at the time predominated in the region. These travels gave Gropius insight not only into the materials—the colonial houses were largely made of wood, in contrast to the masonry buildings Gropius had designed in Europe—but also how these houses could be adapted to New England's climate. The family was also allowed to choose which part of the Storrow estate they wanted. After acquiring an apple orchard on a portion of Storrow's site, in late 1937 the Gropius family acquired five or six trees for the grounds and flattened the top of the hill. Walter incorporated many of the Bauhaus's teachings in his house's design, believing that such elements would become more popular over time, though he maintained that the design did conform to "the best" of New England architecture.

Work on the house itself began in March 1938, and Gropius hired a local contractor, Casper J. Jenney, to build the house. Gropius and Breuer assisted one another in the construction of their homes. Breuer had been in Europe during late 1937, when much of the design work took place, but he is credited with details such as the protruding roof and vertical battens. Early plans indicate that Gropius may have originally contemplated an L-shaped floor plan but that someone, likely Breuer, changed the house to instead use a rectangular plan. Breuer left the northern and eastern elevations unchanged from Gropius's plans, but the second-floor deck to the west and the porch to the south might have been influenced by his intervention. After observing Harvard students visit the house during construction, Jenney agreed to give mentorship and course credits to at least three Harvard students per summer. The house was completed in September 1938, just as a major hurricane came through the area; Jenney, who was stuck there alone during the storm, was the first guest to stay there overnight. The house had cost $18,000 (Note: Equivalent to $322,000 in 2025) or $20,000. (Note: Equivalent to $358,000 in 2025) Ati Gropius, in reference to the house's relatively low cost, continued to call it an "econobox" over a half-century after its completion.

=== Gropius ownership ===
==== 1930s to mid-1960s ====
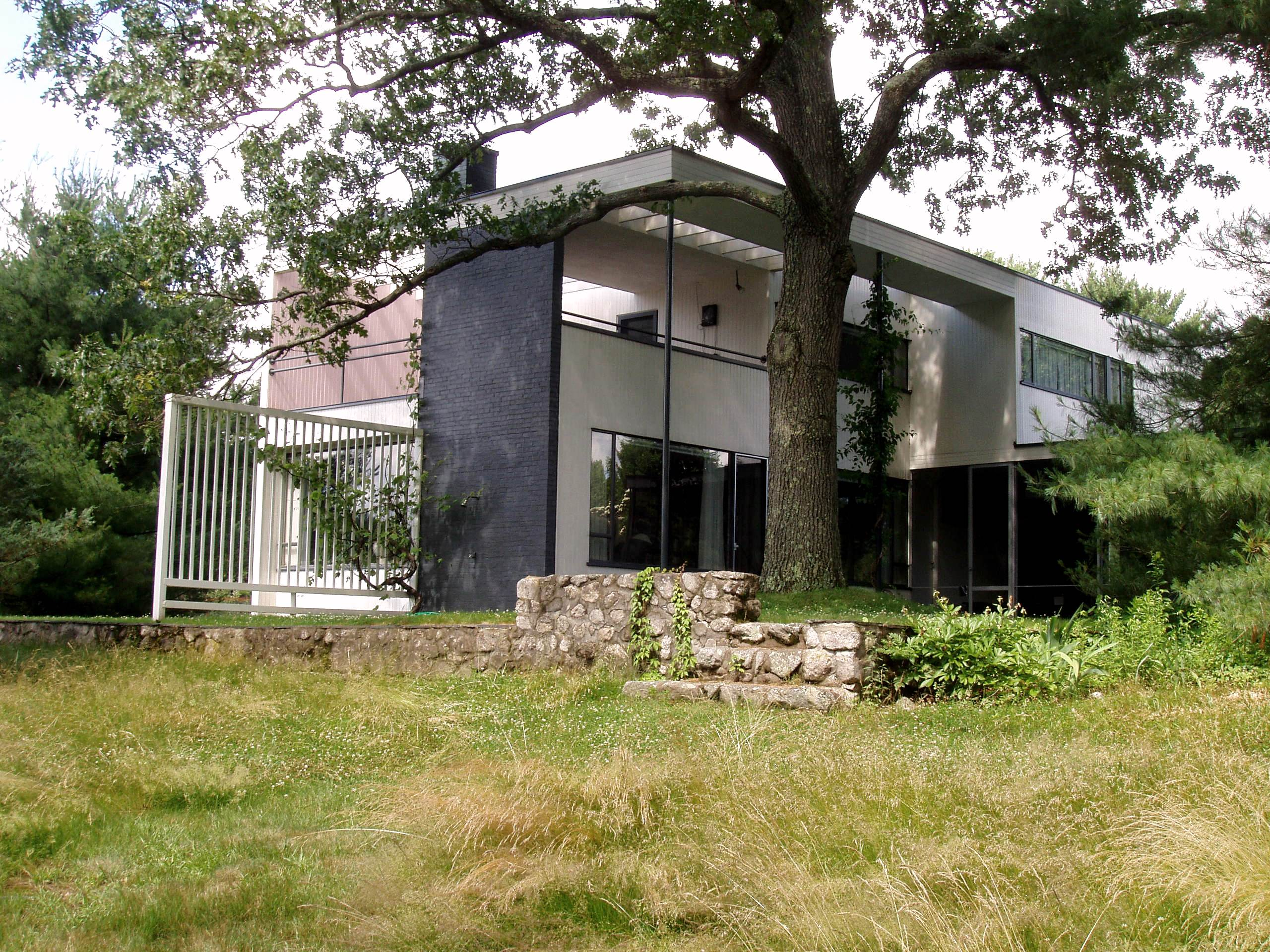
View of the house from the southwest, showing the western (left) and southern (right) elevations

Gropius invited several of his friends to see the house in October 1938. The news circulated among local residents, who flocked to the building, prompting Gropius to formally announce that the house was not open to the public. The completed house accommodated the three members of the Gropius family, along with one maid. The house drew attention for its modernist design, especially as it was the only modern-style residence for many miles around. The scholar Jill Pearlman said the house's distinctive design acted as a "calling card" for Gropius's architectural practice, attracting visitors from all around, while Eric Kramer said the building solidified the "vision of modern architecture in America". After living in the house for a year under various weather conditions, Ise said that "we actually seem to thrive". Gropius's associate Reginald Isaacs described the building as Gropius's "base" for the rest of his life, "no matter what the vicissitudes of school, office, or world".

The Gropius family welcomed several hundred overnight guests at the house, many of whom were also refugees from World War II–era Europe. Among their guests were the composer Igor Stravinsky and the artist Joan Miró. The family also sponsored other refugees from Nazi Germany to come to the U.S.. Isaacs recalled that the house's living room was filled with documents and correspondence relating to these refugees and to Gropius's colleagues. The house was also included on tours of local modernist architecture, but contrary to common public perception, the interior was closed to the public. Ati recalled that her father had always considered esthetics "a primary consideration" in his upkeep of the house. Activities such as meals were accompanied by extensive preparations of such details as table settings and napkin colors. The family re-plated the metal furniture every few years, and Walter experimented with various types of paint and other materials. Some of the paints had issues that were poorly documented and, in later years, exacerbated moisture and mold problems at the house. The house's different heating systems were intended to help the family adjust to sudden changes in the outside temperature, but Ise recalled being caught off-guard by these temperature changes years after the house's completion.

Ati moved out during the 1940s, attending Black Mountain College in North Carolina after her junior year (11th grade) in high school. Afterward, Walter began using his daughter's room. The Gropius family bought the site from Storrow's estate in 1945, following her death. By then, the Gropius family had devised a list of items that needed fixing, including the window cranks, the living-room heating, and redecoration of the interior. Ise recalled in 1946 that, had they built the house that year, they would have instead installed underfloor heating. Although the house was not formally an academic building, Gropius used it as a teaching aid for his students anyway. Gropius worked at Harvard until 1952, during which time students were invited to house gatherings at least twice a year. In conjunction with a facade repainting in 1960, some rooms inside were also repainted. Further interior repainting occurred in 1967, when the roof was fixed.

==== 1970s: After Gropius's death ====
Walter lived at the Gropius House until his death in 1969, after which Ise continued to live there. In his will, Walter had directed Ise to handle the Lincoln property "as you see fit". Most of the furniture and furnishings were no more than 50 years old, so the Internal Revenue Service classified them as "obsolete", rather than the more valuable "antique", for tax purposes. In a 1973 interview with the Quad-City Times, Ise said the building fit her "like a sweater". Young architects and their mentors continued traveling to the house specifically to hear from Ise. The facade again had to be repainted in 1971, and three years later the foyer was repaired after sustaining water damage. In 1974 or 1975, (Note: One source gives a conflicting date of 1979.) Ise donated the property to the Society for the Preservation of New England Antiquities (SPNEA; later Historic New England). The Gropius House became the SPNEA's first acquisition of a modern-style house and the only post-1850 edifice it oversaw. Ise was to continue maintaining the property until she died.

Shortly after being gifted the Gropius House, the SPNEA attempted to raise money from the architectural community for the house's long-term maintenance, but was unsuccessful. In 1975, the SPNEA launched a fundraiser to establish a $500,000 endowment fund for the house, (Note: Equivalent to $2,320,000 in 2025) led by the Harvard Graduate School of Design's dean Josep Lluís Sert. The building was in fair condition, contrasting with other American modernist houses in poor states of repair, such as the Frank Lloyd Wright Home and Studio in Illinois. Tourists continued to come from around the world, though the house had few casual visitors, recording only 140 guests in all of 1976. During the late 1970s, the house was further repaired, and wallpaper was removed from two bedrooms that used that material. In a 1977 book about the house, Ise claimed that the building had not necessitated many repairs, although in actuality there were still issues, such as mold infestations and leaking windows. Ise lived at the house for much of the remainder of her life; she died at a nursing home in 1983. At that time, the SPNEA took ownership of the house.

=== SPNEA and Historic New England use ===
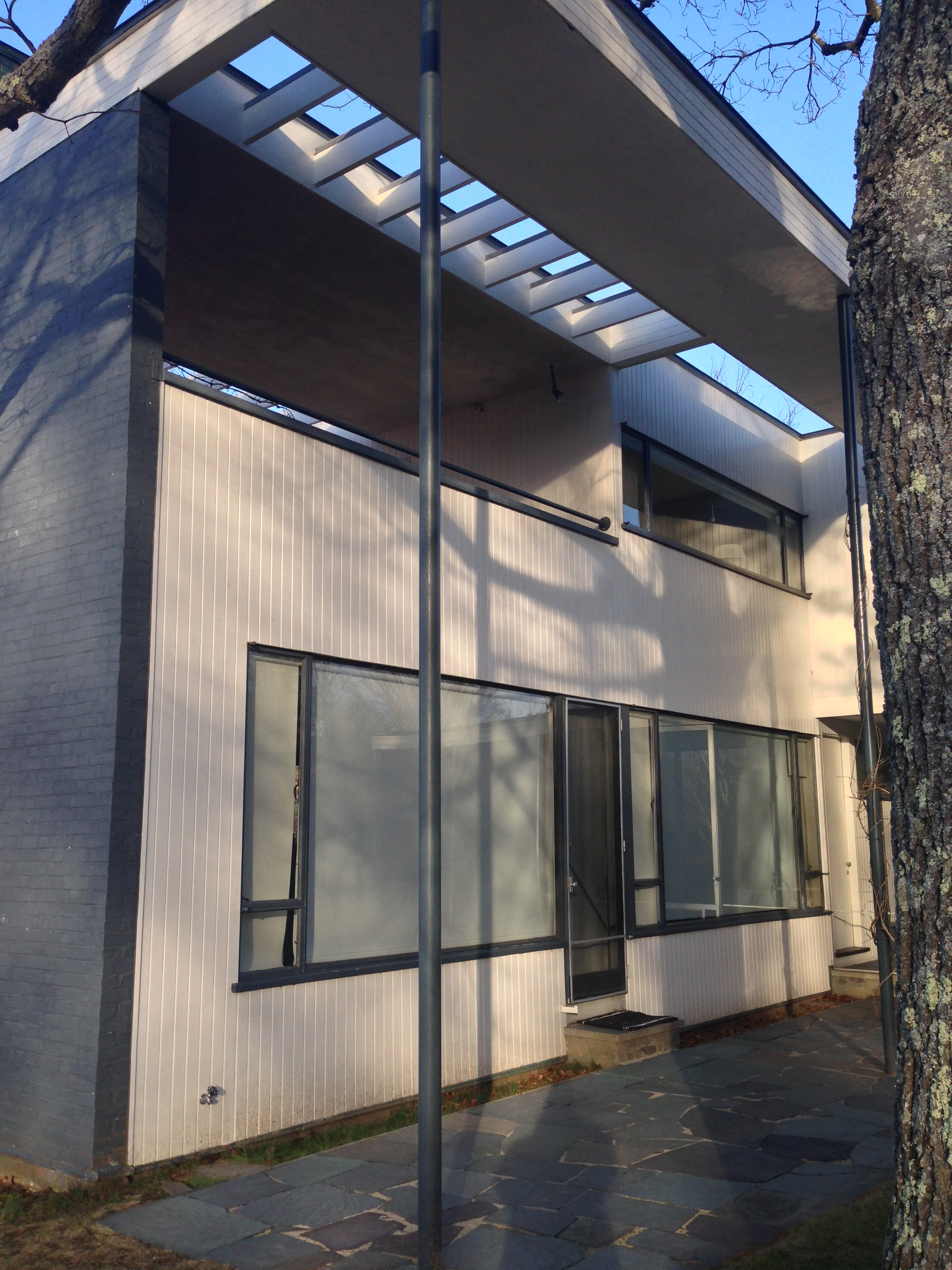
The south elevation, shaded by the protruding roof

The home was initially not open to the public, instead being used as a "study house" for professionals and students to examine. The SPNEA referred to the building as the "Gropius House", rather than as the "Walter Gropius House", because both Walter's wife and daughter had been involved in its design. The organization displayed furnishings, including dining-table settings and a collection of architectural books, to give the impression that the residence was still being lived in. The Gropius House continues to display the family's old furniture and furnishings, including items designed by Breuer. When the house became a museum, it displayed furniture similar to those used between 1965 and 1969, during Gropius's later life. The house gradually became one of Historic New England's most visited attractions, receiving visitors from around the world. The museum archives include writings and correspondence from many of Gropius's guests. Tickets for tours are sold in advance.

==== 1980s to 2000s ====
The house opened to the public on June 1, 1985, becoming a museum. It initially accommodated visitors only during the summer, and on the first weekend of the month during other seasons. At the wishes of Ati Gropius, the SPNEA started renovating the building that year. The organization spent $75,000 renovating the building, (Note: Equivalent to $169,000 in 2025) restoring the house to its 1960s appearance. Proposals to create a visitor center within the house's garage were first brought up in 1987. Disagreements over the original status of nearly everything in the house prolonged the renovation process. The SPNEA's manager of property interpretation wrote that the SPNEA initially conducted research into similarly-styled houses from the same period, as it had done with older houses under its care. This approach did not work for the Gropius House because, as Ati told them, the Bauhaus school had never intended to create a distinct style. The rusting metal furniture was left untouched because the SPNEA was unsure about the era to which the pieces should be restored. The cork floors were replaced, while other features, such as the bronze porch screens and silk curtains, were replaced with slightly different material.

The Gropius House's interior restoration had been completed by early 1989; its preservation contrasted with the fates of other American modernist houses, which at the time were being heavily remodeled or demolished. By then, the house had nearly 3,000 annual visitors. The facade was deteriorating by the mid-1990s, with the metal window frames corroding and the paint flaking off. During that decade, workers discovered the presence of severe water damage around the window frames. They also found that at least some of the windowsills had not been properly waterproofed because of the lack of flashing. The custom heating system made it harder to adjust the relative humidity levels in the house, thereby damaging objects that were either excessively or insufficiently humid. The experimental paint was flaking off, and the flat roof also had issues. The visitor center in the garage finally opened in 1997. By then, tours were restricted for safety and to reduce maintenance needs. Groups of no more than 12 people could enter the house only during the summer, and were required to wear bootees, while the house was closed the rest of the year.

In the late 1990s, the organization spent four years conducting further restorations. The work included adding flashing, renovating the windows, repairing the exterior spiral staircase, and repainting the siding. Conservators took paint samples and studied them under microscopes and microspectrophotometers. Some of the decorative details were difficult to fix, including the window frames, which were no longer commercially available. Part of the work was funded by Massachusetts state government. Additional funds came from the federal Save America's Treasures program, which in 1999 provided $64,349 to repair water damage. (Note: Equivalent to $117,000 in 2025) The renovation's final phase required a two-month closure, which ended in April 2000; the project had cost over $200,000. (Note: Equivalent to $355,000 in 2025) In 2006, Historic New England began hosting "illuminated" nighttime tours of the house on Fridays between November and April, limited to ten people each.

==== 2010s to present ====
By the 2010s, the house hosted "Evening at Gropius" events during May to September, with tours, refreshments, and a slideshow presentation. Ati Gropius continued to advise Historic New England on the house until her death in 2014. The Getty Foundation distributed a preservation grant to the Gropius House in 2015 as part of the foundation's Keeping It Modern program. The $75,000 grant was used to hire preservation consultants to create a management plan. In 2025, Historic New England began hosting an architectural design competition, soliciting designs for a new public restroom and visitor center on the grounds. At the time, the only restroom facilities on the grounds were a single port-a-potty next to the garage. The competition attracted 280 entries; the winning entry was submitted by Isabel Strauss, a faculty member at the nearby Smith College. Strauss said she wanted to create something "deferential yet monumental, and inexpensive to build", using a similar ethos to Gropius's original design without actually copying the architecture.

== Impact and legacy ==
=== Reception ===
==== 1930s to 1970s: Residential commentary ====
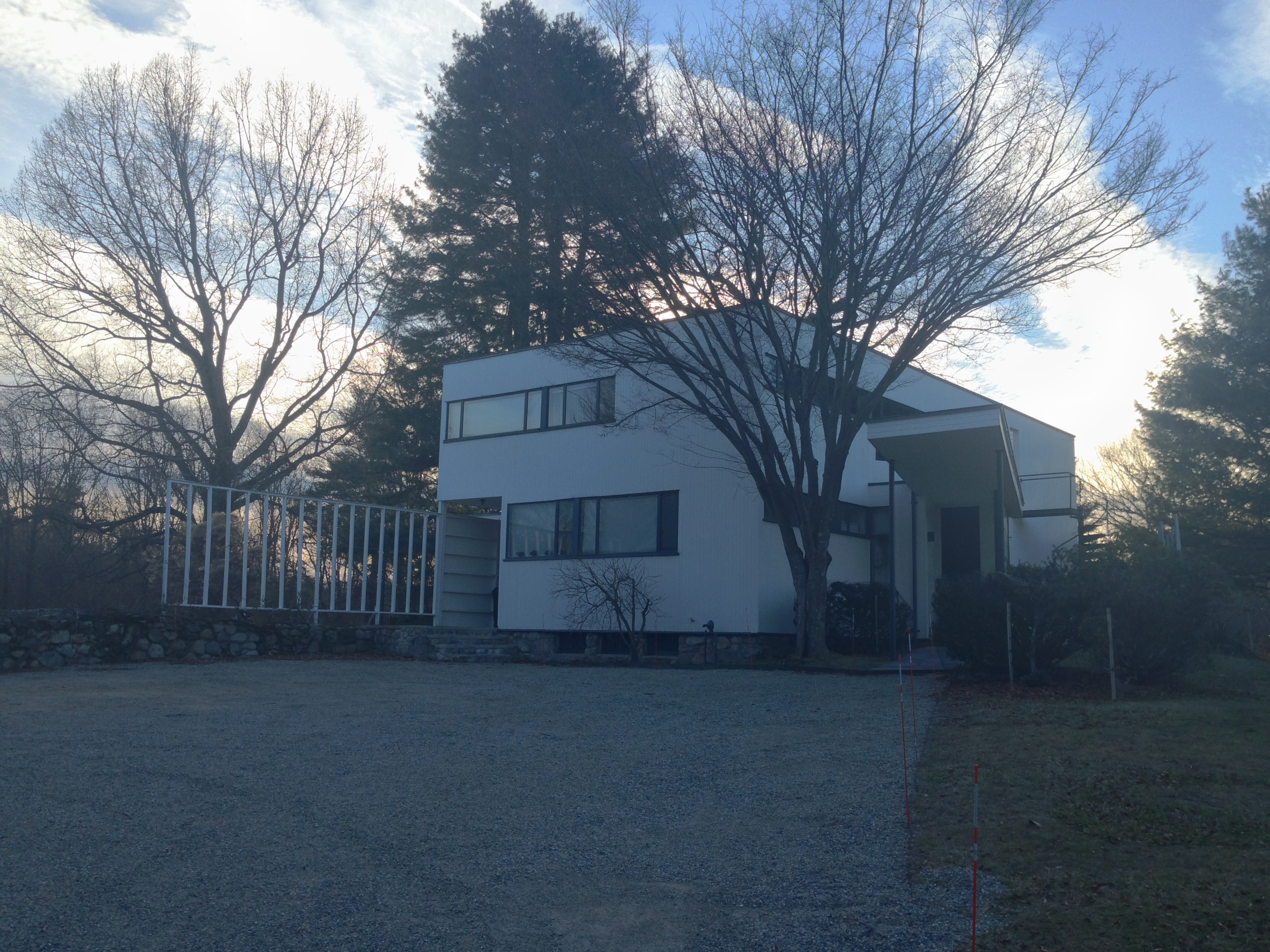
View of eastern elevation from driveway

When the house was completed, local residents were befuddled at its design. One observer retrospectively called it "too far away from the road to be a gas station, not enough clearance to be an airport. So what was it?" The Gropius family's neighbor James Loud did not approve of the Gropius House or the other Woods End Road houses; he complained about being "surrounded by chicken coops", as he felt the modernist designs clashed with his own home's Colonial Revival style. Gropius conversely said that a descendant of John Adams had "to our surprise stated that he thought this modern house was actually more in keeping with the New England tradition of simplicity than quite a few other solutions that he had tried". The American Home magazine wrote in 1938 that the design "seems to have given conservative New England, with its pride in its traditions, something of a turn". When the critic Lewis Mumford visited the house the next year, he called it "the most regional example of the New England home". In 1941, The Christian Science Monitor wrote that the house was notable "for its feeling of being out of doors, while actually inside", and the St. Louis Post-Dispatch said the design "suggests a certain kinship" with older farmhouses nearby. A source from 1952 said that, despite the building's extensive use of modernist exterior features, the interiors were "surprisingly casual in both selection and arrangement".

After the house was deeded to the SPNEA, the architecture critic Robert Campbell said in 1975 that the house was extremely well-preserved and that Gropius had "delightedly experimented with" already-commonplace design features, such as porches, in novel ways. He later said that the house was still "fresh and delightful", though he regarded its appearance as "highly stylized" despite Gropius's intentions to the contrary. Also in 1975, another writer for Building Design described the interior as having "a museum quality", but said that much of the design was only possible because of Breuer's intervention. Ada Louise Huxtable called it the "revolutionary architectural shot heard around the country". Huxtable said the house's furnishings seemed antique, but that the building was still charming and nostalgia-inducing and that it was as much an icon as an 18th-century building by Charles Bulfinch. The Christian Science Monitor wrote in 1978 that the artworks and furnishings still exuded a dynamic, Bauhaus-like spirit.

==== 1980s to present ====
In 1983, The New York Times described the Gropius House as a mid-century American residential masterpiece, alongside Frank Lloyd Wright's Fallingwater and Ludwig Mies van der Rohe's Farnsworth House. When the house opened as a museum, Campbell wrote that the building still felt livable, while Joseph Giovannini wrote that the building had been an icon of modern architecture in the United States from its inception. A writer for The Christian Science Monitor called it "a startling presence on the New England countryside" that demonstrated Gropius's skill. The Boston Globe wrote in 1986 that the house "has serenity and engaging order when empty"; another writer for the same paper called the Gropius House both a work of art and representative of its style of architecture, yet also controversial. In the early 1990s, the Jerusalem Post called it "a curious amalgam of Bauhaus principles and New England traditions", and the architectural historian Sigfried Giedion wrote that the house did not emphasize its modernist credentials and that the spaces were "agreeably relaxing". Historic Preservation magazine described the Gropius House and the 18th-century Codman House, both owned by SPNEA, as "superb examples of their kind".

A writer for the Sun Sentinel of Fort Lauderdale, Florida—who happened to be a friend of the house's caretaker at the time—said in 1995 that the house was very well maintained despite its dissimilarities from a quintessential American house. Country Life said that, disregarding the stylistic differences from typical New England houses, the Gropius House fit well with the region's architecture because of its materials and lack of ostentation, while The Recorder of Greenfield, Massachusetts, said it "somehow smacks of traditional New England" in its selection of material. In 2004, one commentator wrote that the house felt like a Bauhaus time capsule and that the arrangement of the family's belongings made the house feel "as if the family has just stepped out". Another writer in 2013 said that the house's design was "tastefully sleek", with its juxtaposition of 1930s-era housing development theory and older wood-frame design. The next year, the Globe wrote that the building had been a "stubborn monument to light in a world turning dark", citing the large windows overlooking the landscape and the symbolism of "white surfaces promising a climate of better thoughts and actions".

=== Architectural influence, media, and landmark designations ===
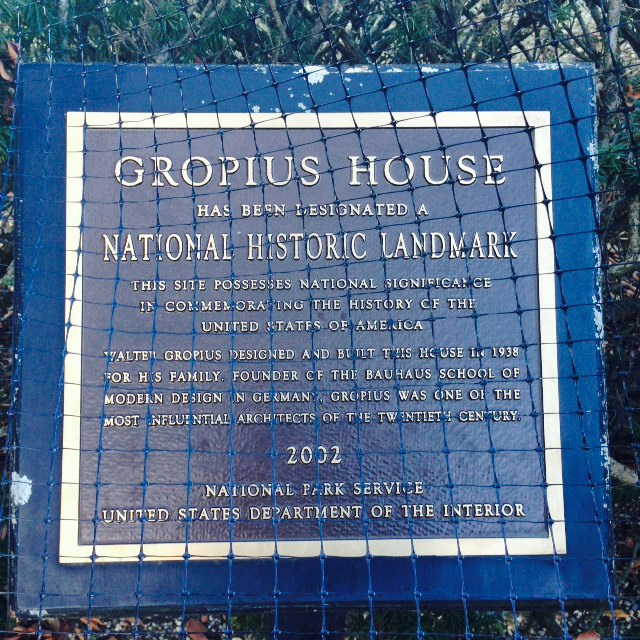
Landmark designation marker

The Gropius House and the other Woods End Road houses were early examples of modernist residences in the eastern United States; previously, such houses had been confined mostly to the West Coast. The writer Ada Louise Huxtable said the buildings' completions "determined the course of serious building in this country from then on", and the houses also helped spur the construction of other modernist structures in Lincoln and New England. Gropius and Breuer continued to design buildings in partnership until 1942; many of these structures had wooden walls and flat roofs, as the Gropius House had. The British magazine Country Life retrospectively said in 1977 that the house had included many "daringly new" features that later became commonplace in residential designs. Such features include fireplaces without mantels, pictures placed on surfaces, free-flowing rooms, and wall-mounted bookshelves. Even the Bauhaus furniture designs were widely copied, to the extent that later commentators described the decor as looking unremarkable or dated.

After completing the Gropius House, Walter built a similar house for the Kaplan family in nearby Newton, Massachusetts, in 1947. The United States Postal Service issued a stamp in 1982, depicting the house, to honor Gropius's designs. The house's design inspired another in nearby Framingham, Massachusetts, along with the Butterfly House, built in the Hollywood Hills of Los Angeles in 2001, It was used in a 2003 multimedia art exhibition by Lorna Simpson as part of the SPNEA's "Yankee Remix: Artists Take on New England" show. In addition, it was featured in a 1965 exhibit at New York's Museum of Modern Art.

The Gropius House is a contributing property to the Woods End Road Historic District, which was added to the National Register of Historic Places (NRHP) on July 8, 1988. The Gropius House was also designated as a National Historic Landmark (NHL) on May 16, 2000, placing it on the NRHP in its own right. The NHL designation honored the building's influence on American culture and history.

== See also ==
- List of National Historic Landmarks in Massachusetts
- National Register of Historic Places listings in Middlesex County, Massachusetts
- Lincoln House
