= Ati Gropius Johansen =

German-born graphic designer (1926–2014)

- Born: Beate Frank; 1926; Wiesbaden, Germany
- Died: September 7, 2014; Boston, Massachusetts, US
- Other name: Ati Forberg
- Occupations: Designer, artist, teacher
- Parents: Walter Gropius; Ise Gropius

Beate "Ati" Gropius Johansen (1926 – September 7, 2014) was a German-born graphic designer, artist, teacher, and illustrator. Her adoptive parents were Modernist architect Walter Gropius and his second wife Ise Frank Gropius, who was Ati's biological aunt. Throughout her career she illustrated 47 books. Her work is now part of various art institutions' collections.

== Life and work ==
Ati Gropius was born Beate Frank in Wiesbaden, Germany. She was adopted by architect and Bauhaus founder Walter Gropius and his second wife Ilse (Ise) Frank when she was nine years old after the death of her biological mother, Ise's sister Hertha Frank. She emigrated to the United States with her adoptive parents in 1937, when Walter Gropius came to teach at Harvard University's Graduate School of Design. The family lived at the Gropius House designed by Walter. Ati attended primary and secondary school at nearby Concord Academy.

From the summer of 1943 through the summer of 1946, Ati studied art and design at Black Mountain College in North Carolina under Josef Albers, who had also been a professor at the Bauhaus.

After completing her studies, she moved to Boston at the age of 21. She then lived in Rome, Colorado, and Chicago before settling in New York City. Her first marriage to designer Charles Forberg ended in divorce. She later married architect John M. Johansen, who would become the last surviving member of the Harvard Five, an architectural group heavily influenced by Walter Gropius.

Ati worked as a designer, teacher, and artist, and illustrated 47 books. She taught workshops based on Albers's Bauhaus design courses at various institutions including the Museum of Modern Art in New York City and the Walter Gropius School in Erfurt. She was also a sponsor of the Bauhaus Archive, which was founded in 1960 by Walter Gropius in Berlin.

Johansen's drawings and paintings are held in the collections of and have been exhibited at the Asheville Art Museum, Black Mountain College Museum + Arts Center, and the State Archives of North Carolina.

== Death ==
She died of brain cancer on September 7, 2014, at the age of 88.

== Publications ==
=== Books written ===
- (Published under the name Ati Forberg) The Very Special Baby: A Christmas Story, illustrations by Carol Woodard, Fortress, 1969.
- Walter Gropius: The Man Behind the Ideas, Boston, Mass: Historic New England, 2012.
- Ise Gropius, Boston, Mass: Historic New England, 2013.

=== Books illustrated ===
- Edwin O'Connor, Benjy, Little, Brown, 1957.
- George Mendoza, And Amadeo Asked, How Does One Become a Man?, Braziller, 1959.
- Phyllis McGinley, Boys Are Awful, F. Watts, 1962.
- Charlotte Brontë, Jane Eyre, Macmillan, 1962.
- Wendy Sanford and Mendoza, The Puma and the Pearl, Walker, 1962.
- (And editor) On a Grass-Green Horn: Old Scotch and English Ballads, Atheneum, 1965.
- Pauline Palmer Meek, The Broken Vase, Marshall C. Dendy, 1965.
- Edgar Allan Poe, Tales, Whitman, 1965.
- Doris H. Lund, Attic of the Wind, Parents Magazine Press, 1967.
- Helen Cresswell, Where the Wind Blows, Funk, 1968.
- Frances Brailsford, In the Space of a Wink, Follett, 1969.
- Mendoza, The Starfish Trilogy, Funk, 1969.
- Lawrence F. Lowery and Albert B. Carr, Quiet as a Butterfly, Holt, 1969.
- Ruth J. Adams, Fidelia, Lothrop, 1970.
- Aileen L. Fisher, Jeanne d'Arc, Crowell, 1970.
- Barbara Schiller, Erec and Enid, Dutton, 1970.
- Florence P. Heide, The Key, Atheneum, 1971.
- Chloe Lederer, Down the Hill of the Sea, Lothrop, 1971.
- Sarah F. Tomaino, Persephone, Bringer of Spring, Crowell, 1971.
- Pauline P. Meek, God Speaks to Me, John Knox, 1972.
- Doris Van Liew Foster, Feather in the Wind: The Story of a Hurricane, Lothrop, 1972.
- Yoshiko Uchida, Samurai of Gold Hill, Scribner, 1972.
- Mendoza, Poem for Putting to Sea, Hawthorne, 1972.
- Barbara K. Walker, The Ifrit and the Magic Gifts, Follett, 1972.
- Ann McGovern, If You Lived With the Circus, Four Winds, 1972.
- Fisher, "You Don't Look Like Your Mother," Said the Robin to the Fawn, Bowmar, 1973.
- Lyon S. DeCamp, editor, Tales Beyond Time: From Fantasy to Science Fiction, Lothrop, 1973.
- Anne N. Baldwin, A Friend in the Park, Four Winds, 1973.
- Nancy C. Smith, Josie's Handful of Quietness, Abingdon, 1975.
- Edna Barth, Cupid and Psyche: A Love Story Retold, Seabury Press, 1976.
- Cresswell, A Game of Catch, Macmillan, 1977.
- Robbin Fleisher, Quilts in the Attic, Macmillan, 1978.
- Carol Fenner, The Skates of the Uncle Richard, Random, 1978.
- Barbara S. Hazen, The Me I See, Abingdon, 1978.
- C. S. Adler, The Magic of the Gilts, Macmillan, 1979.
