= Acoustic plaster =

Sound absorbent coating

Acoustic plaster is plaster which contains fibres or aggregate so that it absorbs sound. Early plasters contained asbestos, but newer ones consist of a base layer of absorptive substrate panels, which are typically mineral wool, or a non-combustible inorganic blow-glass granulate. A first finishing layer is then applied on top of the substrate panels, and sometimes a second finishing layer is added for greater sound attenuation. Pre-made acoustic panels are more commonly used, but acoustic plaster provides a smooth and seamless appearance, and greater flexibility for readjustment. The drawback is the greater level of skill required in application. Proprietary types of acoustic plaster developed in the 1920s included Macoustic Plaster, Sabinite, Kalite, Wyodak, Old Newark and Sprayo-Flake produced by companies such as US Gypsum.

== Basic composition ==
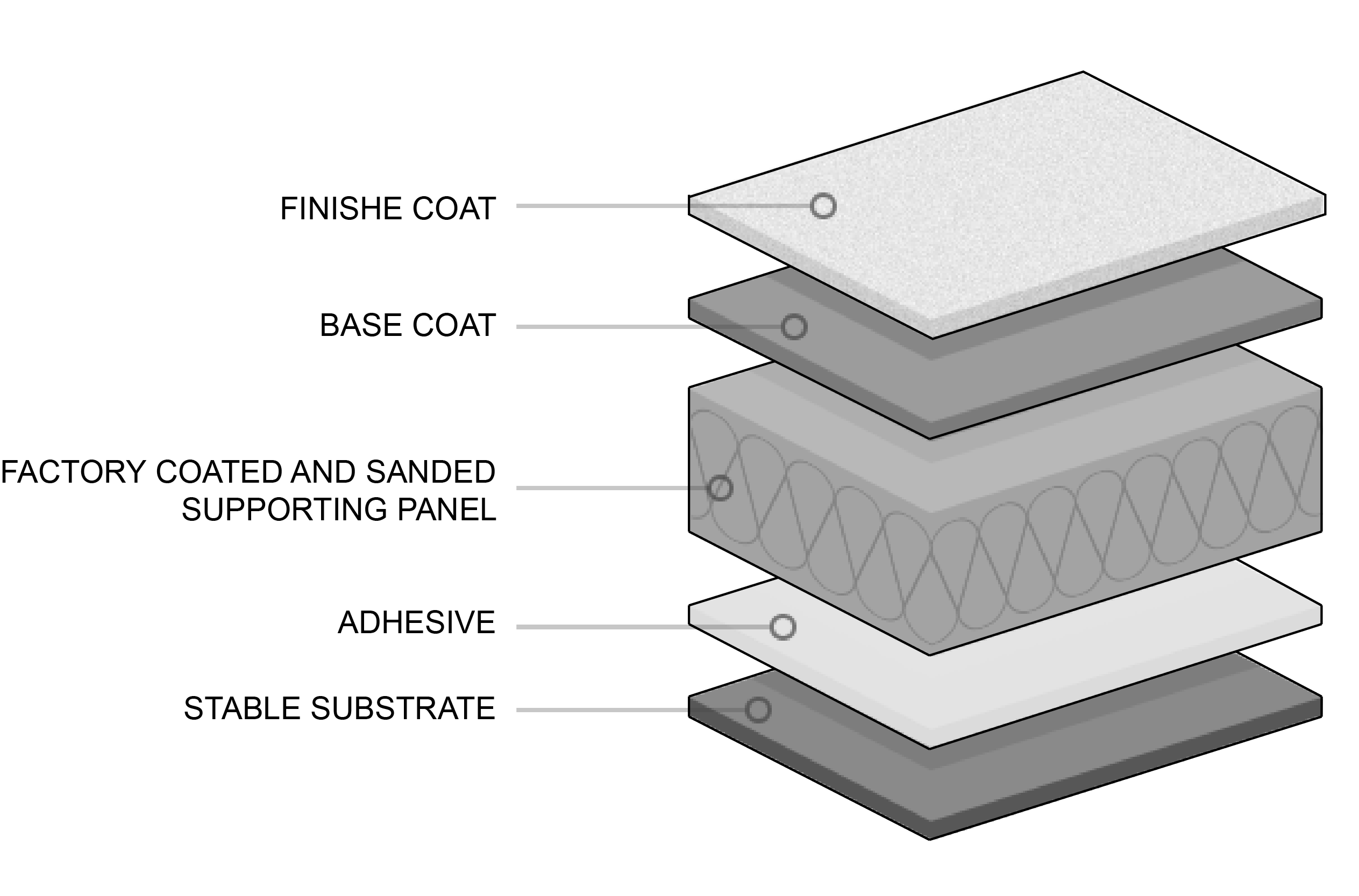

Acoustic plasters are aesthetically favorable because it allows for seamless smooth application compared to panels that show visible joints. Some acoustic plasters contain aggregate, but better systems incorporate fiber. Acoustic plasters are generally applied at a thickness between 1/16” and 1.5”. Acoustic plasters consist of a base layer of absorptive substrate panels, which are typically mineral wool, or a non-combustible inorganic blow-glass granulate. A first finishing layer is then applied on top of the substrate panels and when dried, produces a first layer of sound attenuation. A second finishing layer may also be added to create a second system of sound attenuation. If the second density if less than or equal to that of the first layer, the sound attenuation of the second layer would be greater than the first and vice versa. This allows for the flexibility of changing the acoustic properties of the space.

== Acoustic properties ==
Acoustic plasters can significantly reduce the sound reverberation within the space. Most acoustic plasters have a Noise Reduction Coefficient between 0.5 and 1.00. The Noise Reduction Coefficient (NRC) determines the ability of a material to reflect or absorb sound. It is a number between 0 and 1, which 0 being perfectly reflective and 1 being perfectly absorptive. The application of acoustic plasters helps to increase the intelligibility of voice, music, and other sounds under desirable environment. In addition, acoustic plasters are also fireproof and LEED rated. However, it can be more fragile, being affected by physical stress and humidity.

== Advantage ==
Compared to acoustic plaster, acoustic panels are the most commonly used material for controlling the sound environment of space. Acoustic panels were often made of a mineral wool composition that is very absorbent of sound. Although acoustic panels are common in basements or recreational areas, they are seldom used in living spaces due to aesthetic reasons. Instead, conventional plaster or drywall systems were more frequently used in homes and other environments where interior aesthetics is a more important consideration but these are, however, not ideal in sound absorption. Limitations of acoustic panels or conventional drywall systems also affect the flexibility of room configuration and uses. Alternating the acoustic properties in order to address changing room functions would indicate changing the entire acoustic system, which is costly and time-consuming. In contrast, acoustic plasters provide a smooth applicable and a seamless appearance. It also allows greater flexibility for readjustment.

== Application ==
Despite its advantage, acoustic plaster requires high levels of artisan skills in order to obtain the rated sound absorption coefficients. The proportions and recommended mixing time of the plaster must be followed strictly in order to achieve the desired result. To ensure seamless surface, it is recommended to start with a ceiling that is perfectly level. The absorptive substrate panels are then attached with its seams filled and sanded smooth. Layers of plaster coating are then applied to achieve a seamless smooth surface. Acoustic plasters may be worked to produce different surface textures but must be done timely after the application.

Different types of mounting styles for acoustic plasters can also affect the acoustic performance of the system. These mounting types include direct to substrate, suspended or direct to framing, or a plaster only system that can be sprayed on directly to the substrate without the placement of any acoustical boards. Control joints may also be built into the system to prevent cracks within the plaster.

Acoustic plaster is used in construction of rooms which require good acoustic qualities such as auditorium and libraries. Proprietary types of acoustic plaster developed in the 1920s included Macoustic Plaster, Sabinite, Kalite, Wyodak, Old Newark and Sprayo-Flake produced by companies such as US Gypsum. These superseded felts and quilts as a common preference of architects but were difficult to apply and so were superseded in turn by acoustic tiles.

== Examples ==
=== Institute for Contemporary Art at the Virginia Commonwealth University ===
The Institute for Contemporary Arts is a non-collecting contemporary art institution designed by Steven Holl Architects and located on the Virginia Commonwealth University campus in Richmond. The design by Steven Holl Architects emphasizes the fluidity of interior and exterior space and fosters the connection between technology and natural resources. The design, however, creates reverberant sounds that disturb the experience within the museum. Acoustic plaster was used as a remedy to address the sound environment without compromising design. The application of acoustic plaster significantly reduced the sound reverberation, especially in the 33-foot tall central forum, where or echoing would otherwise occur due to the high ceiling.

=== Auburn University Jule Collins Smith Museum of Fine Art ===
The Jule Collins Smith Museum of Fine Art is located at the Auburn University and features a collection of 20,000 pieces of art. As a museum originally constructed in 2003, the acoustics of the building, which were experiencing problems due to long reverberation times that made conversations within the space even unintelligible, needed some significant upgrades. Acoustic plaster was introduced to solve the acoustic issues. It significantly reduced the reverberation time and added a tranquil quality and brought a more comforting experience to the space.

== Historic problem ==
Starting in the 1920s, asbestos had become a prevailing material to replace animal hair in the mixture of plasters. Due to the sound-absorptive and lightweight qualities of asbestos, it was also commonly used in the composition of acoustic plasters. The application of this type of acoustic plaster to the ceiling is often known as the "popcorn ceiling" due to its aesthetic texture. However, asbestos introduced health-hazards to the acoustic plaster, for both the users of space and especially for the workers installing the plaster. This became a major health problem of early acoustic plasters.
