= Isokon =

Architecture firm

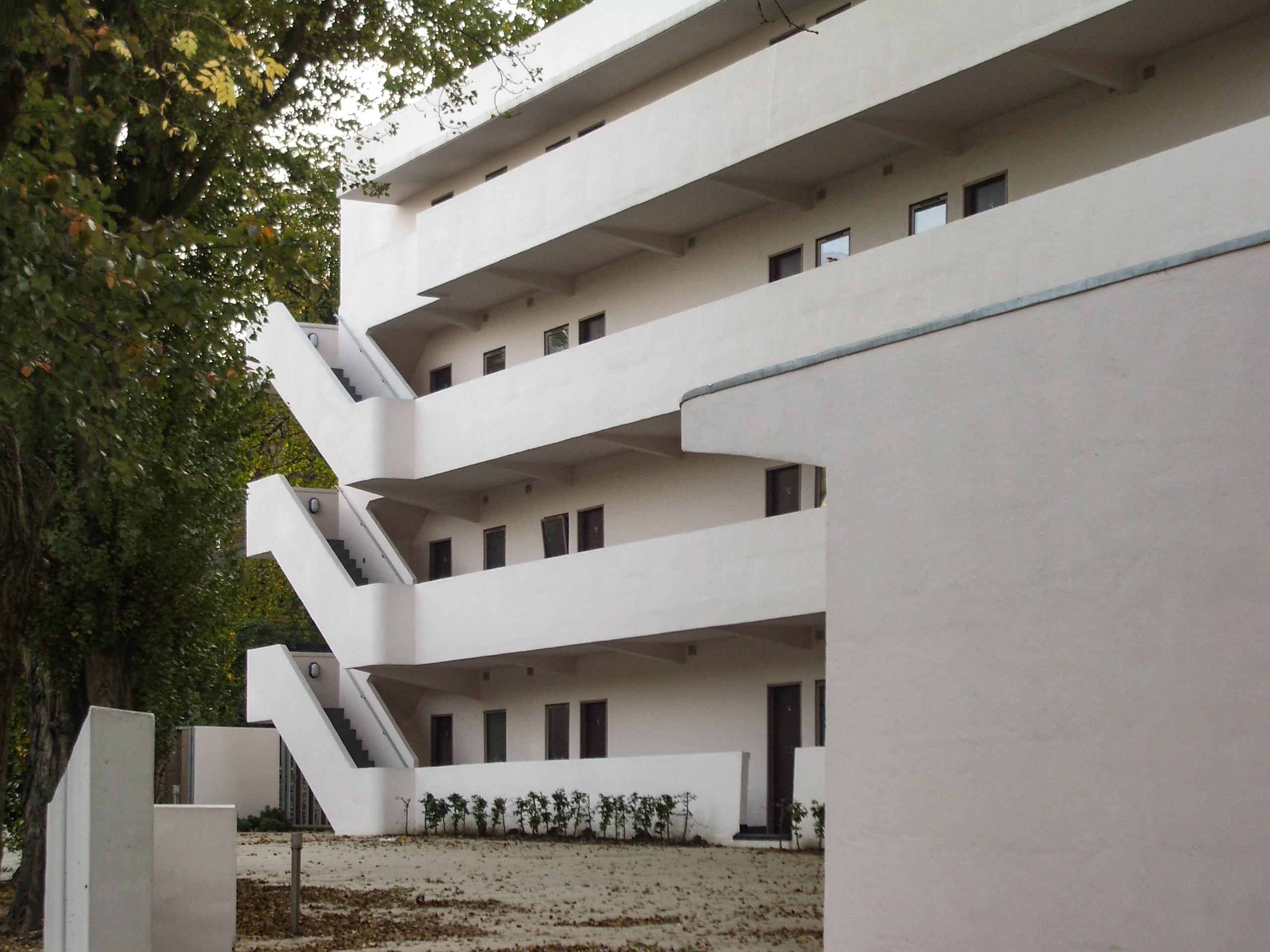
The Isokon Building

Isokon was an architecture firm based in London. It was founded in 1929 by the English entrepreneur Jack Pritchard and the Canadian architect Wells Coates to design and construct modernist houses and flats, and furniture and fittings for them. Originally called Wells Coates and Partners, the name was changed in 1931 to Isokon, a name derived from Isometric Unit Construction, bearing an allusion to Russian Constructivism.

In 1925, Pritchard had become employed as a sales and marketing manager for the British company Venesta, a subsidiary of the large Estonian plywood manufacturer A. M. Luther, based in Tallinn. After having met in Paris, Pritchard hired the designer Charlotte Perriand through the architect firm of Le Corbusier to design a trade fair stand for Venesta at Olympia, London in 1929. Despite his involvement with Lawn Road Flats and the Isokon company, Jack Pritchard continued to work for Venesta until 1936. Pritchard used Venesta to make his Isokon plywood furniture.

The Isokon company was never commercially successful. The end came with the outbreak of World War II when its supply of plywood from Estonia was cut off due to the Soviet invasion of the Baltic countries when the A. M. Luther company in Tallinn was confiscated. The Isokon Furniture Company ceased trading in 1939 but was restarted in 1963. Since 1982, the furniture is made by Isokon, formerly known as Windmill Furniture and Isokon Plus, under licence from the Pritchard family.

== Lawn Road Flats ==
Isokon's key project was the Lawn Road Flats in Hampstead, called the Isokon building since 1972, which was formally opened on 9 July 1934. It was designed by Wells Coates after a brief by Molly Pritchard, based on the Minimum Flat concept presented at the CIAM (Congrès internationaux d'architecture moderne) conference of 1929. In March 1931, Wells Coates, Jack Pritchard and Serge Chermayeff had visited Germany, including the Bauhaus school and the Törten Estate in Dessau, both designed by Walter Gropius, which possibly influenced the design of Lawn Road Flats. The building process and the opening event was photographed by Edith Tudor-Hart (née Edith Suschitzky) who was educated 1928–30 at the Bauhaus school in Dessau, but also a recruiter for Soviet intelligence. Intended to be the last word in contemporary living, the block of flats was aimed at young professionals. It contained 22 single flats, four double flats, three studio flats, staff quarters, kitchens and a large garage. Services included shoe cleaning, laundry, bed making and food sent up by a dumb waiter at the spine of the building. In 1937, a restaurant and bar designed by Marcel Breuer and F. R. S. Yorke named the Isobar, located on the ground floor with a decked outdoor area, was added to the building. Its second manager was Philip Harben, who after World War II became the first TV chef at the BBC. Jack Pritchard also set up a supper club called The Half Hundred Club, so named because it could have no more than 25 members who could bring 25 guests. They dined at the Isobar, at Pritchard's penthouse flat in Lawn Road Flats or at more exotic locations, such as London Zoo.

The flats and the Isobar became famous as a centre for intellectual life in north London. Residents included the novelist Agatha Christie and her husband, the archaeologist Max Mallowan, the Soviet intelligence recruiter Arnold Deutsch who was the controller of the group of Cambridge educated Soviet spies who came to be known as the Cambridge Spy Ring, the German born economist and Communist Jürgen Kuczynski, the author Nicholas Monsarrat, ethnomusicologist Erich Moritz von Hornbostel, architect Jacques Groag and his textile designer wife Jacqueline Groag, architects Egon Riss and Arthur Korn and the author Adrian Stokes. The British architects Sir James Stirling and Alec Bright, later director of the Museo del Oro in Bogotá, Colombia were resident during the 1960s. Regulars at the Isobar included the sculptors Henry Moore and Barbara Hepworth, the painter Ben Nicholson and Naum Gabo, all who lived locally, as well as Sir Julian Huxley, secretary of the Zoological Society of London 1935–1942.

Pritchard remained in London during World War II while Molly Pritchard and their children Jonathan and Jeremy left for America where the children were put in a boarding school in Canada while Molly moved in with Walter and Ise Gropius in Lincoln, Massachusetts. Lawn Road Flats was popular as a residence during the war due to being made out of reinforced concrete, and despite near bombs, survived the Blitz. It was repainted brown during the war as it was feared its white surface would serve as a navigation aid for German bombers.

In 1955, Pritchard staged a 21st-birthday party for the building on its roof top terrace. Philip Harben returned to make the food, architectural writer Nikolaus Pevsner made a speech and letters from Walter Gropius, Marcel Breuer and Agatha Christie were read out. Wells Coates as well as many pre-World War II residents attended the event.

From 1966, Jack and Molly Pritchard increasingly spent their time at a new home in Blythburgh, Suffolk, designed by Jack's daughter Jennifer Jones (née Tudor-Hart) and her husband Colin, although they kept the penthouse at Lawn Road Flats until the mid 1970s. The modern bungalow, also called Isokon, is still owned by the Pritchard family.

Pritchard sold Lawn Road Flats in 1969 to the magazine New Statesman, who demolished the Isobar and converted it into flats. They then sold the building to Camden Council in 1972 for twice the price. The building was listed Grade II in 1974 by English Heritage and listed Grade I in 1999. Despite this, it received poor maintenance from Camden Council and deteriorated badly. During this period, it was chiefly used to house single men with drug, alcohol and mental health problems. After a long campaign to save the building, it was sold to the housing association Notting Hill Housing Group in 2003, in a joint bid with Avanti Architects, headed up by architect John Allan, with the pledge that a museum would open in the building. It now contains 36 flats, most that are owned on Equity sharing basis by key workers such as nurses and teachers. In July 2014, the building's garage was converted into a permanent exhibition that tells the story of the building, its residents and the Isokon company. It is operated by the not-for-profit charitable Isokon Gallery Trust and is open 11 am to 4 pm each Saturday and Sunday from early March until the end of October every year.

== Bauhaus in Britain ==
In 1935, Walter Gropius, the founder of the Bauhaus, became Controller of Design (effectively creative director) for The Isokon Furniture Company. He had arrived in England on 18 October 1934 with his wife Ise Gropius. They lived in flat 15 at Lawn Road Flats until March 1937, when they left for the United States after Gropius was offered the post of Professor of Architecture at Harvard University. A month before he left for the USA, Gropius recommended Marcel Breuer, a former colleague at the Bauhaus who had moved into flat 16 in the building in the autumn of 1935, as his replacement as Controller of Design. The furniture Breuer designed whilst at Isokon are highly influential pieces of the modernist movement, and included chairs, tables and the Long and Short Chair.

László Moholy-Nagy, another former Bauhaus teacher who also lived briefly in the building with his wife Sibyl Moholy-Nagy and daughter Hattula, became involved with Isokon when he arrived in Britain from Holland in May 1935. Moholy-Nagy designed promotional material for the Isokon Furniture Company, including sales leaflets, show cards and the logo of the Isokon firm itself, which was an outline of a curved plywood chair. He later founded The New Bauhaus in Chicago, soon renamed the IIT Institute of Design.

The fourth Bauhaus resident at Lawn Road Flats was Naum Slutzky, a Russian born goldsmith who had taught at the Bauhaus school in Weimar. He remained in Britain until his death in 1965.

On 9 July 2018, an English Heritage blue plaque for the three Bauhauslers Walter Gropius, Marcel Breuer and László Moholy-Nagy was unveiled on the building.

== Isokon furniture revival ==
Pritchard revived the Isokon Furniture Company in 1963. Pritchard hired Ernest Race, former furniture designer for the Festival of Britain. In 1968, Pritchard licensed John Alan Designs, based in Camden, London to produce the Long Chair, Nesting Tables and the Isokon Penguin Donkey Mark 2 designed by Ernest Race. The Isokon Penguin Donkey Mark 2 became a sales success due to the support of Allen Lane, the founder on Penguin Books. In 1982, Chris McCourt of Windmill Furniture was handed the baton by Jack Pritchard to manufacture the historical Isokon furniture pieces. The first furniture to be added to the collection since 1963 was designed by the duo BarberOsgerby. Edward Barber and Jay Osgerby had recently graduated from the Royal College of Art when they designed their first piece, the Loop Coffee Table, in 1996. The bent plywood design was to be the first of several furniture pieces that the designers created for what was then named Isokon Plus. Their most recent design was the Bodleian Chair for the University of Oxford's historic Bodleian Libraries. Since then new designs have been added to the collection by notable designers such as Jasper Morrison and Foster + Partners Industrial Design.

== Original Isokon furniture designs ==
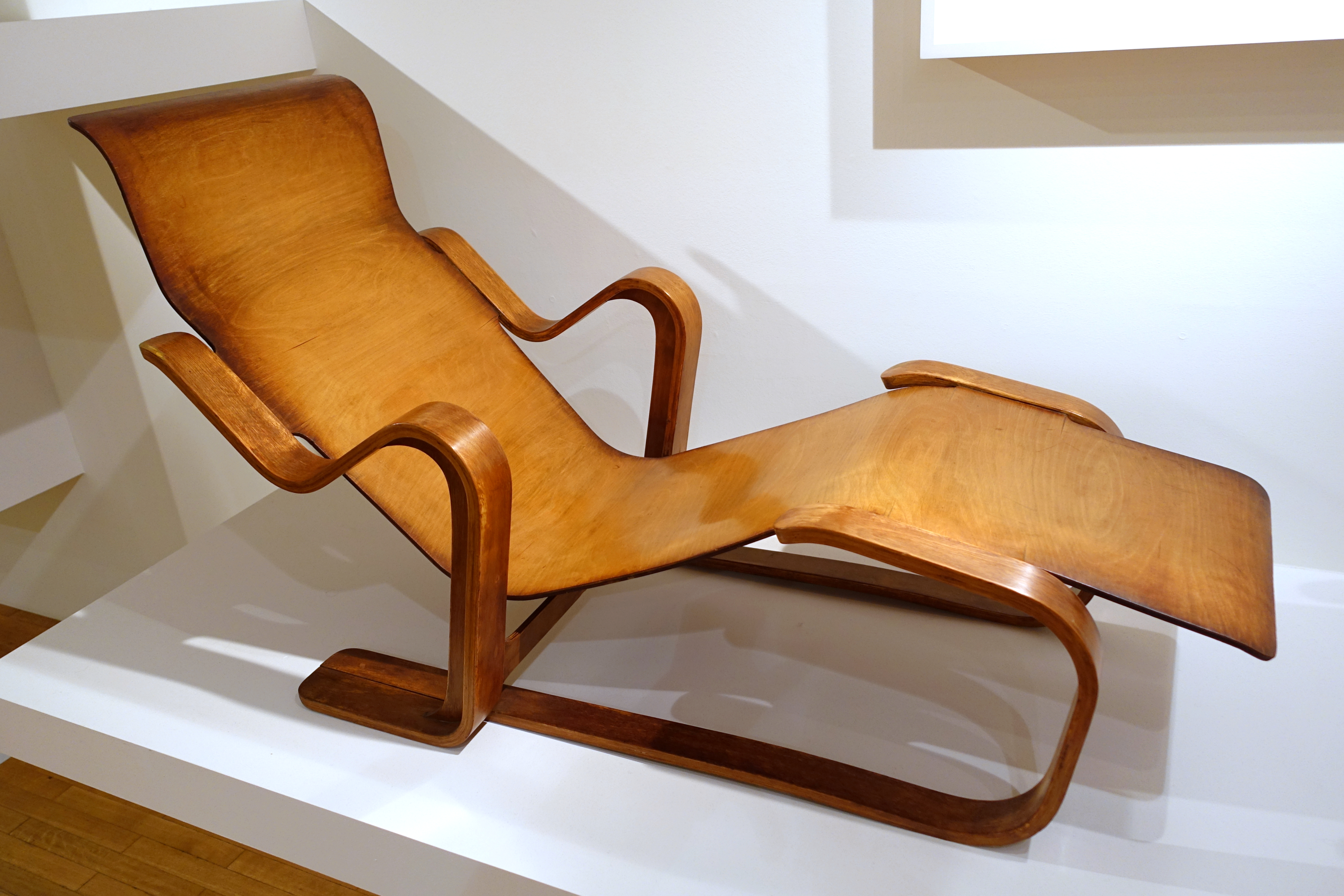
Isokon Long Chair, designed by Marcel Breuer, Isokon Furniture Company, 1935

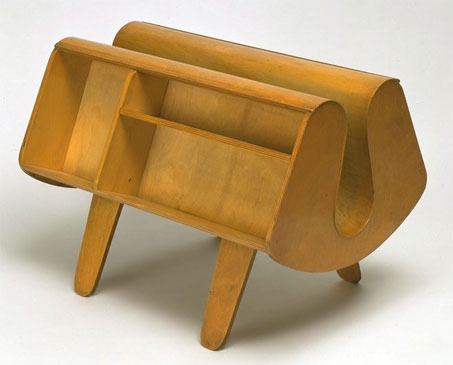
Penguin Donkey, 1939

- Isokon/Venesta Stool (designer unknown, 1933)
- Isokon Book Units (designed by Wells Coates, 1933)
- Desk made from Isokon Book Units (designed by Wells Coates, 1933)
- Aluminium Waste Paper Basket (designed by Walter Gropius, 1935)
- Side Table (designed by Walter Gropius, 1936)
- Isokon Nesting Tables (designed by Marcel Breuer, 1936)
- Isokon Dining Table (designed by Marcel Breuer, 1936)
- Isokon Stacking Chair (designed by Marcel Breuer, 1936)
- Isokon Long Chair (designed by Marcel Breuer, 1935-6)
- Isokon Short Chair (designed by Marcel Breuer, 1935-6)
- The Gull (designed by Egon Riss, 1939)
- The Pocket Bottleship (designed by Egon Riss, 1939)
- The Bottleship (designed by Egon Riss, 1939)
- The Penguin Donkey (designed by Egon Riss, 1939)
- The Bottleship Mark 2 (designed by Ernest Race, 1963)
- The Penguin Donkey Mark 2 (designed by Ernest Race, 1963)

== Later Windmill/Isokon Plus/Isokon designs ==
- Loop Coffee Table (designed by BarberOsgerby, 1996)
- Flight Stool (designed by BarberOsgerby, 1998)
- Wing Unit (designed by Michael Sodeau, 1999)
- Home Table (designed by BarberOsgerby, 2000)
- Shell Table and Chair (designed by BarberOsgerby, 2002)
- Portsmouth Bench (designed by BarberOsgerby, 2002)
- Donkey 3 (designed by Shin & Tomoko Azumi, 2003)
- Bodleian Libraries Chair (designed by BarberOsgerby, 2014)
- Iso-Lounge Chair (designed by Jasper Morrison, 2021)
- Join Chair and Tables (designed by Foster + Partners, 2025)
