= Groag =

Groag is a surname. Notable people with the surname include:

- Edmund Groag (1873–1945), Austrian classical scholar
- Jacqueline Groag (1903–1986), British textile designer
- Jacques Groag (1892–1962), British architect and an interior designer
- Lillian Garrett-Groag, Argentine-American playwright, theater director, and actress
- Susan Groag Bell (1926–2015), Czech-American women's studies academic
