= Isokon Flats =

Grade I listed building in London Borough of Camden, United Kingdom

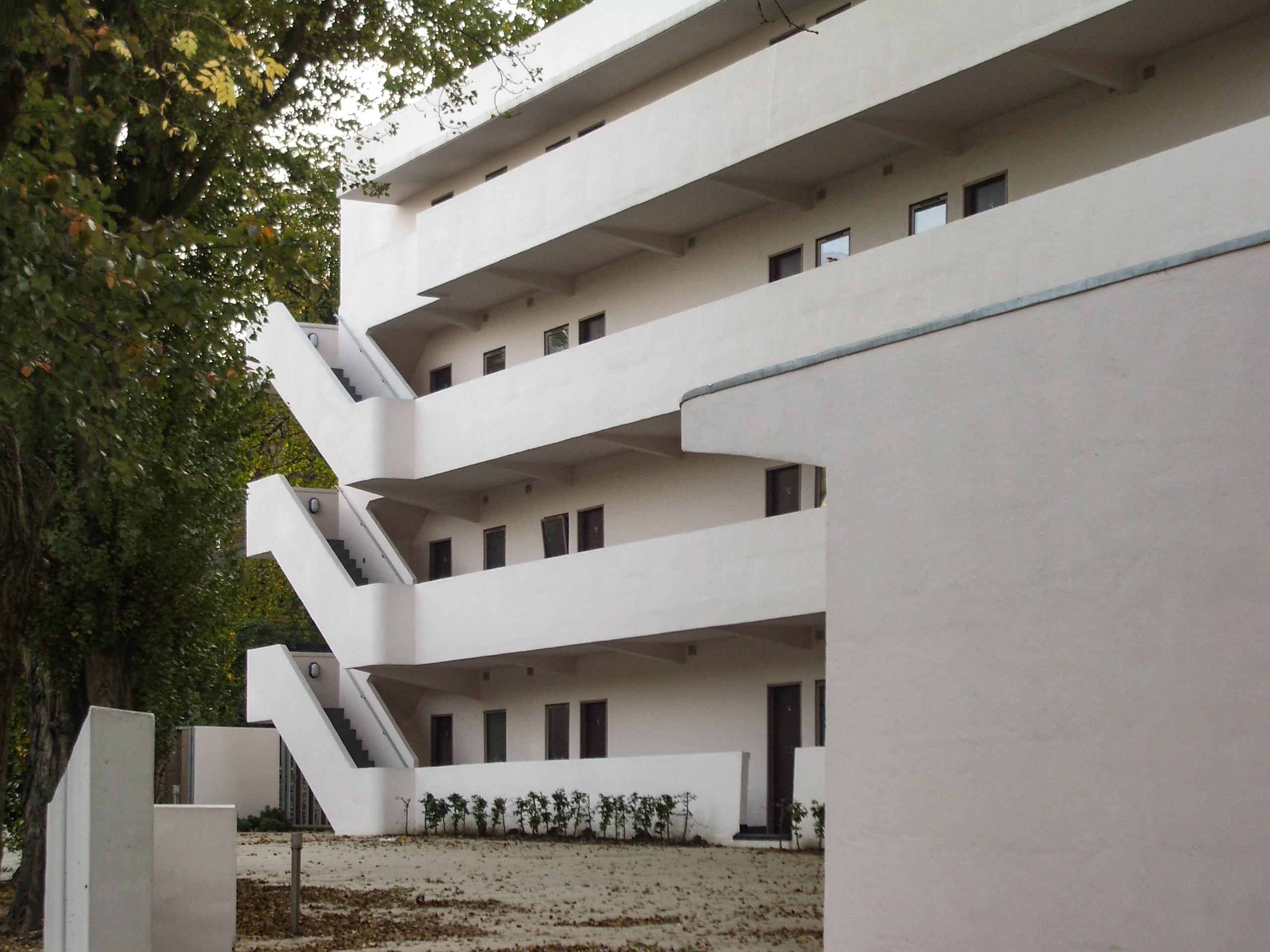
- The Isokon Flats in 2005

- Location within Greater London Location within England Location within the United Kingdom

General information
- Status: Completed
- Type: Gallery
- Architectural style: Art Deco, Bauhaus, modernist
- Location: Belsize Park, London Borough of Camden, London, United Kingdom
- Coordinates: 51°33′06.63″N 00°09′43.50″W
- Year built: 1929–1932
- Construction started: 1929
- Completed: 1934
- Owner: Notting Hill Housing Association

Design and construction
- Architect: Wells Coates

Listed Building – Grade I
- Official name: Numbers I, 1A, 1B, 1C and 1D and 2-32 Isokon Flats
- Designated: 14 May 1974
- Reference no.: 1379280

Isokon Flats, also known as Lawn Road Flats and the Isokon building, on Lawn Road, Belsize Park in the London Borough of Camden, is a reinforced-concrete block of 36 flats (originally 32), designed by Canadian engineer Wells Coates for Molly and Jack Pritchard.

== Pre-war years ==
Designs for the flats were developed between 1929–1932 and the complex opened on 9 July 1934 as an experiment in minimalist urban living. All of the "Existenzminimum" flats had very small kitchens as there was a communal kitchen for the preparation of meals, connected to the residential floors via a dumbwaiter. Services, including laundry and shoe-polishing, were provided on site.

The building originally included 24 studio flats, eight one-bedroom flats, staff quarters, a kitchen and a large garage. The Pritchards lived in a one-bedroom penthouse flat at the top with their two sons Jeremy and Jonathan next door in a studio flat. Plywood was used extensively in the fittings of the apartments; Jack Pritchard was marketing manager for the Estonian plywood company Venesta between 1926 and 1936, while he also operated the Isokon Furniture Company, originally in partnership with Wells Coates.

Celebrated residents included: Bauhaus émigrés Walter Gropius, Marcel Breuer, and László Moholy-Nagy; architects Egon Riss and Arthur Korn; writer Agatha Christie (between 1941 and 1947) and her husband Max Mallowan, art historian Adrian Stokes, the author Nicholas Monsarrat, the archaeologist V. Gordon Childe, modernist architect Jacques Groag and his wife, textile designer Jacqueline Groag. The communal kitchen was converted into the Isobar restaurant in 1937, to a design by Marcel Breuer and F. R. S. Yorke. The flats and particularly the Isobar became renowned as a centre for socialist intellectual and artistic life in Hampstead. Regular visitors to the Isobar included nearby residents Henry Moore, Barbara Hepworth and Ben Nicholson.

== Espionage ==
A number of Isokon residents were later identified as Soviet agents and the building was subject to surveillance by the British security services in the 1930s and during the Cold War period. In the mid-1930s Flat 7 was occupied by Arnold Deutsch, the NKVD agent who recruited the Cambridge Five. Soviet spy Jürgen Kuczynski lived at Isokon while teaching economics at the University of London.

== Post-war years ==
The Isokon furniture company ceased trading at the outbreak of World War II but was restarted in 1963. The British architect Sir James Frazer Stirling was a resident during the early 1960s. In 1969 the building was sold to the New Statesman magazine and the Isobar was converted into flats. In 1972 the building was sold to Camden London Borough Council and gradually deteriorated until the 1990s when it was abandoned and lay derelict for several years.

== Rescue and refurbishment ==
In 2003 the building was sympathetically refurbished by Avanti Architects, a practice which specialises in the renovation of modernist buildings, for the Notting Hill Housing Association which purchased it from Camden London Borough Council. Notting Hill Housing Association remains the freeholder. During the comprehensive restoration, the services were completely renewed, heating and insulation discreetly upgraded and the later overcoat of render removed from the exterior. The building now has a smooth external finish and is the palest tint of pink in colour, as it was originally—not pure white as has been assumed from black and white historical photos. The building is now partly occupied by key workers under a shared-ownership scheme whilst the larger flats have been sold outright.

== Isokon Gallery ==
As part of the refurbishment, an exhibition gallery was created in the former garage, run since 2014 wholly by volunteers as a non-profit micro-museum to tell the story of the building, the social and artistic life of its residents and the Isokon furniture company. The gallery is open weekends only, 11.00 a.m. to 4.00 p.m. from the beginning of March until the end of November. Flats in the Isokon building are private and cannot be visited, except during Open House in September each year.

== Designation ==
The building was designated a Grade I listed structure in 1999, placing it amongst the most significant historic buildings in England. An English Heritage blue plaque was fixed in 2018 to commemorate the residence of the Bauhaus masters Gropius, Breuer and Moholy-Nagy.

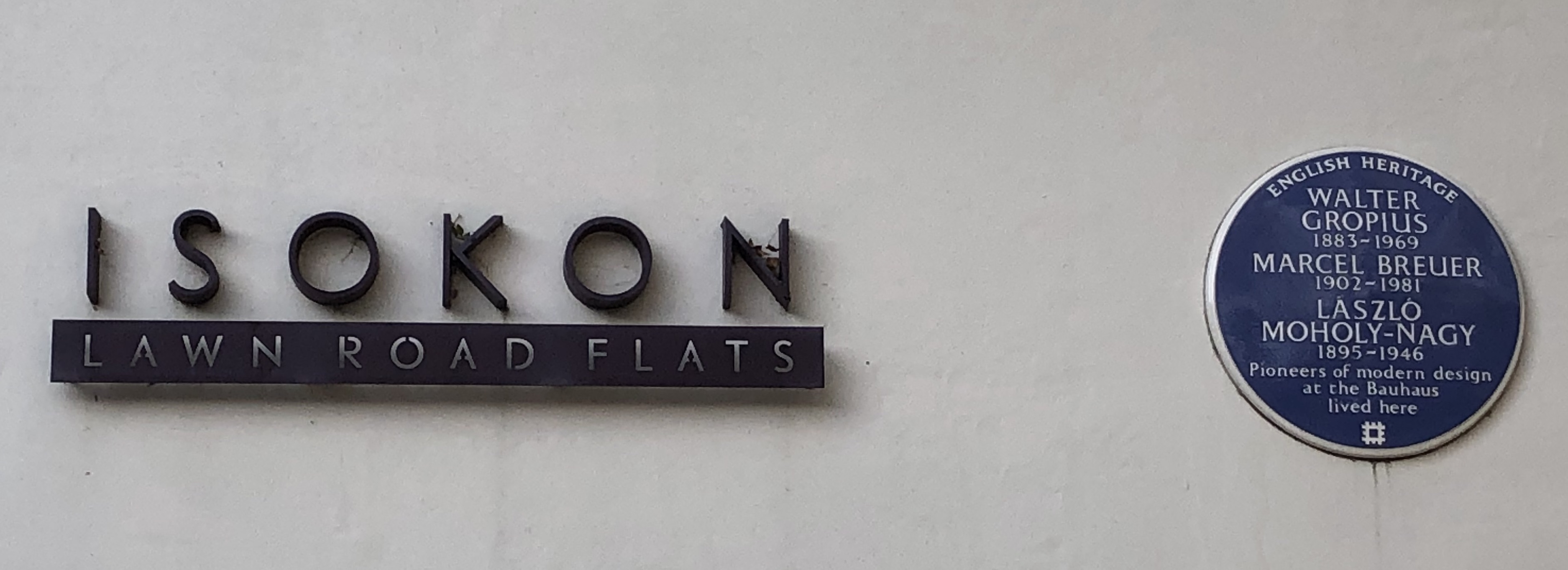
English Heritage plaque

== Publications ==
- Buckley, Cheryl (1981). Isokon: Architecture, Furniture and Graphic Design, 1931-1939. University of Newcastle upon Tyne.
- Burke, David (2014). The Lawn Road Flats: Spies, Writers and Artists. Boydell & Brewer Ltd. ISBN 9781843837831.
- Daybelge, Leyla; Englund, Magnus (2019). Isokon and the Bauhaus in Britain. Pavilion Books. ISBN 9781849944915.
