= Geller (disambiguation) =

Geller is a surname.

Geller may also refer to:

- Gellér, Hungarian name of Holiare, Slovakia
- Geller I, Modernist house in Lawrence, New York, U.S.
