= Isokon Long Chair =

Chair by Marcel Breuer

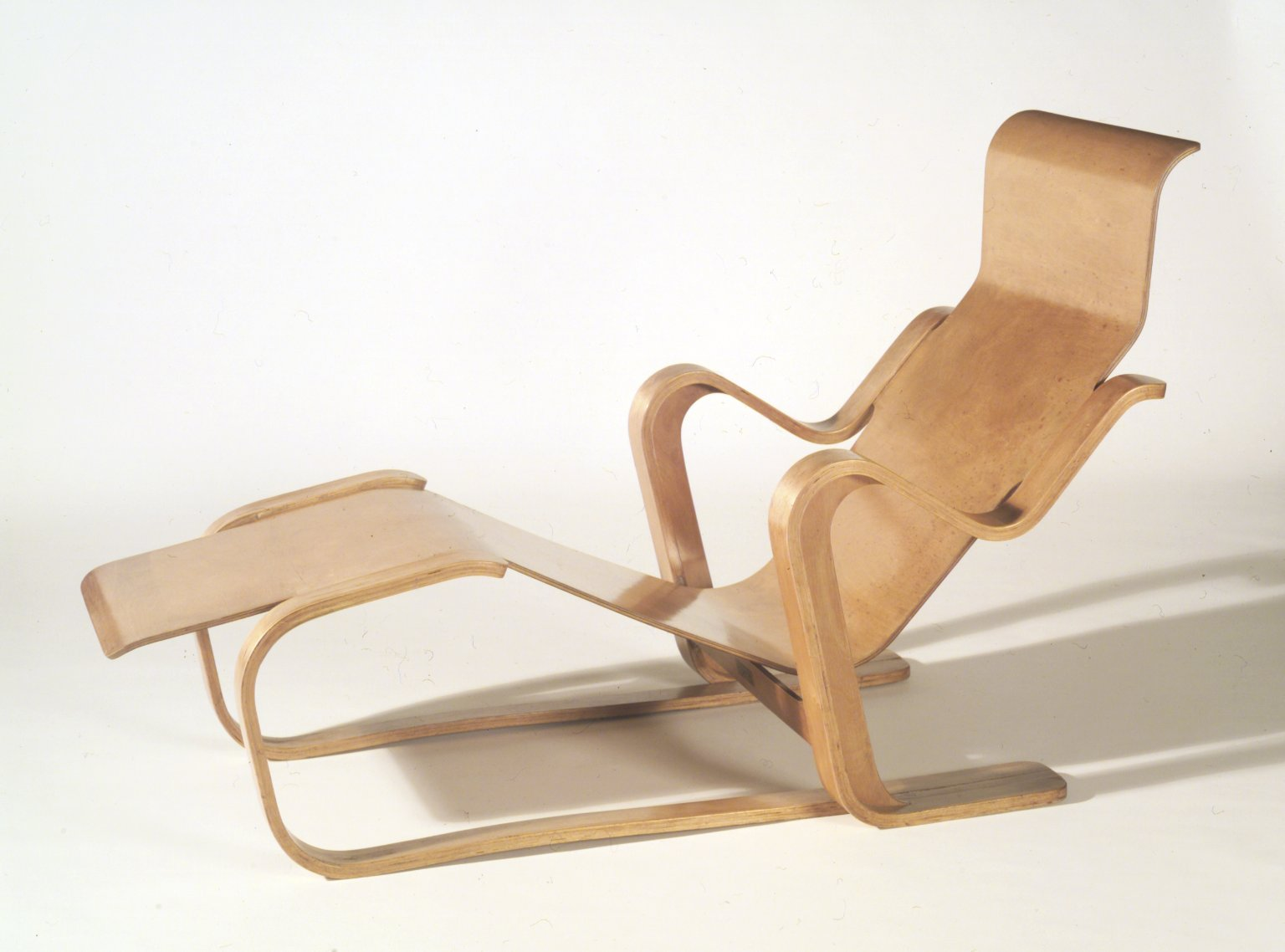
Marcel Breuer. Long Chair, c. 1935–1936 Brooklyn Museum

The Isokon Long Chair is a chair designed by Marcel Breuer for the Isokon company in 1935–36. The chair is considered one of the most important pieces of furniture to emerge from the inter-war modern movement and it is in the permanent collections of several internationally renowned museums including the Victoria and Albert Museum.

Breuer came to Britain in the mid-1930s following the closure of the Bauhaus by the Nazis. He became acquainted with Jack Pritchard, the owner of Isokon, who suggested he design furniture for the company. Pritchard had become interested in the plywood designs of Alvar Aalto and wanted to produce similar furniture himself. The Long Chair was an adaptation of a previous design for an aluminium-framed chaise Breuer had produced in 1932.
