= Philip Harben =

English cook (1906–1970)

- Born: 17 October 1906; Fulham, London, England
- Died: 27 April 1970 (aged 63)
- Occupations: Cook, broadcaster

Philip Hubert Kendal Jerrold Harben (17 October 1906 – 27 April 1970) was an English cook, known for his radio and television programmes about food and cooking.

With no formal training as a cook he ran a restaurant in Hampstead in the 1930s and had charge of a major airline's test kitchens in the 1940s, before being spotted by the BBC and given his own series on radio from 1943 and television from 1946. In 1955 he moved to Independent Television, where he presented his cookery programmes until 1969. He aimed to show viewers the basics of cookery techniques, and published more than twenty books on the subject between 1945 and his death in 1970.

== Life and career ==
=== Early years ===
Harben was born in Fulham, London, on 17 October 1906, into a theatrical family. His parents – Hubert Harben and Mary Jerrold – were actors, and his younger sister, Joan, joined the profession, becoming celebrated as Mona Lott in the BBC radio series It's That Man Again (ITMA). As a child Harben spent considerable time in the kitchen with the family's cook while his parents were away on tour. He later recalled, "I could scramble eggs and make mayonnaise long before I could read Thucydides or solve a quadratic equation".

After education at Highgate School, Harben went on the stage. His appearances included Treasure Island with Arthur Bourchier in the Christmas 1925 season in the West End. He later worked with John Grierson on the documentary film Drifters (1929), and in the 1930s he pursued a career as a photographer. His photographs of fashion models appeared frequently in The Bystander and Illustrated Sporting and Dramatic News, and, according to The Bookseller, he was also known for his dust-jackets for thrillers. On 19 July 1930 he married Katharine Joyce Kenyon; they had a son and a daughter.

=== Cook ===
In 1937 Harben was invited to manage the Isobar restaurant in the Isokon building, a modernist block of flats in Hampstead, and he subsequently took over as its chef. He found the technical processes of cooking interesting, and became so knowledgeable that his friend Raymond Postgate, later the founder of The Good Food Guide, looked to him for answers to technical questions. The food writer Paul Levy describes Harben as "a member of the avant-garde intellectual left", and together with Postgate, he founded the Half Hundred Dining Club, whose members included Marcel Breuer, Ernst Freud, Walter Gropius, Julian Huxley and Francis Meynell. The club, described as "a poor man's food and wine society", offered its twenty-five members and their guests dinner for a modest price per head.

During the Second World War Harben enlisted in the Royal Air Force, but an eye injury put an end to his flying career. He joined the British Overseas Airways Corporation, taking charge of its test kitchens, creating, from the scarce, rationed ingredients available, dishes suitable to be served to Allied war leaders and others during intercontinental flights. The BBC spotted him while he was demonstrating to journalists how to make an omelette from powdered egg. He gave a radio talk in September 1943 titled "The new cooking comes to the canteen", describing his experiences as a catering adviser in war-time. This was quickly followed by a series called "The Kitchen Front", in which he spoke about mainly technical aspects of cooking, setting out the basics for the benefit of beginners. This ran until 1945. He published his first cookery book, The Way to Cook, which he described as not a recipe book, but one to explain the ideas and principles of cooking.

=== Television ===
Audiences were drawn by his professional-looking skill, his assurance, and his evident pleasure in preparing good food, as well by his clubbable personality.

— Paul Levy.

When television resumed in Britain, after being suspended during the war, Harben made his screen debut in June 1946 in the first of a series called Cookery which ran until March 1948. Like the earlier radio programmes it focused on basic techniques and making the best use of scarce ingredients (food rationing became even more stringent in the early post-war years than it had been at the height of the war). Levy describes Harben as the first British television cook (the BBC's pre-war onscreen cook, Marcel Boulestin, died in his native France in 1943) "part entertainer, part teacher… plump, bearded, and genial, with a racy delivery".

Television was broadcast live in the 1940s, and Harben had some minor disasters in front of the camera. On one occasion he cracked an egg that was so bad that he had to abandon the demonstration amid his own and the studio crew's helpless laughter, and on another he reached the last moments of the programme to discover that he had forgotten to switch the oven on for the dish he was meant to be cooking.

Harben became so well known from his television appearances that he was cast playing himself in two British comedy films, Meet Mr Lucifer (1953) and Man of the Moment (1955). His celebrity status was underlined in Terence Rattigan's Separate Tables in which two of the characters, Lady Matheson and Mr Fowler, leave their table announcing they are off to watch "dear Philip Harben", from whose culinary presentations "one suffers the tortures of Tantalus".

In 1955 Harben moved from the BBC to join the newly formed Independent Television (ITV), where his programmes, such as The Grammar of Cooking and The Tools of Cookery, ran regularly until 1969, with associated cookery books published in tandem. In 1958 he helped found the Harbenware kitchen utensils company, which built up a substantial turnover. The Harbenware company, based in Bury, Greater Manchester, was dissolved in November 2024.

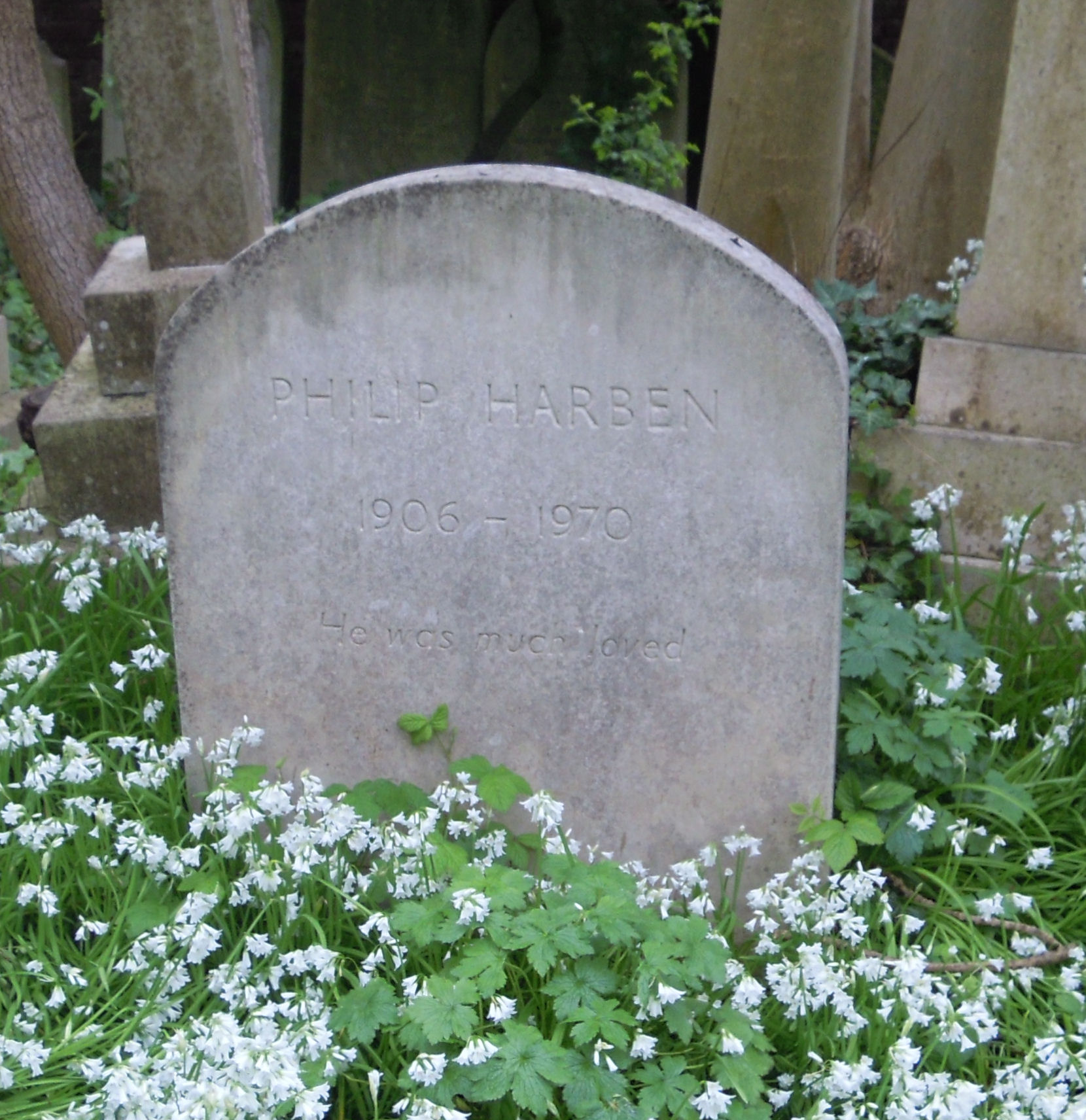
Harben's grave in Highgate Cemetery

Harben died on 27 April 1970, aged 63, and was buried in London's Highgate Cemetery.

== Publications ==
- The Way to Cook, London: John Lane, The Bodley Head, 1945
- Cooking Quickly, London: John Lane, The Bodley Head, 1946
- Entertaining at Home (with Katharine Harben), London: Bodley Head, 1951
- Television Cooking Book London: Odhams Press, 1951
- The Pocket Book of Modern Cooking, News of the World, 1951
- The Young Cook, London: Peter Nevill, 1952
- Cooking with Harben (ed. Katharine Harben), London: Herbert Jenkins, 1953
- Traditional Dishes of Britain, London: Bodley Head, 1953
- Philip Harben's Cookery Encyclopedia, London: Odhams, 1955
- The Teen-age Cook, London: Arco 1957
- Best Dishes from Europe, London: Arco, 1958
- Best Quick Supper Dishes, London: Arco, 1958
- Best Party Dishes 1958
- Cooking, Penguin, 1960
- Philip Harben's Book of the Frying Pan, London: Bodley Head, 1960
- Imperial Frying with Philip Harben, London: Bodley Head, 1961
- The Grammar of Cookery, London: Penguin, 1965
- The Way I Cook, London: Frewin, 1965
- The Tools of Cookery, London: Hodder Paperbacks, 1968. ISBN 0-340-04410-1
- Cooking Quickly, Brighton: Clifton Books, 1969. ISBN 0-901255-01-7
- Philip Harben's Count Down Cookery, London: Dent, 1971. ISBN 0-460-03965-2

== Sources ==
- Burke, David (2014). The Lawn Road Flats: Spies, Writers and Artists. Woodbridge: Boydell Press. ISBN 978-1-84-383783-1.
- Geddes, Kevin (2021). A Conceit of Coney (PDF). Oxford: Oxford Symposium on Food and Cookery. ISBN 978-1-90-924876-2.
- Rattigan, Terence (1999) [1955]. Separate Tables. London: Nick Hern. ISBN 978-1-85-459424-2.
- Tominc, Ana (2022). Food and Cooking on Early Television in Europe. Abingdon: Routledge. ISBN 978-0-36-734788-8.
