= Sarah Agnes Wintemute Coates =

Canadian educator

- Born: Sarah Agnes Wintemute; September 9, 1864; Port Stanley, Ontario, Canada
- Died: 1945 (aged 80–81); Tokyo, Japan
- Occupations: Educator, nutrition consultant
- Children: 6, including Wells Coates

Sarah Agnes Wintemute Coates (September 9, 1864 – 1945) was a Canadian educator, nutritional researcher, and writer, based in Japan.

== Early life and education ==
Wintemute was born in Port Stanley, Ontario, the daughter of Benjamin Wintemute and Esther Anne Willson Wintemute. She graduated from Alma College.

== Career ==
After college, Wintemute became a missionary in Japan under the auspices of the Women's Missionary Society of the Methodist Church. She arrived in Tokyo in 1886, and taught with Eliza Spencer Large at a girls' mission school, Toyo Eiwa Jogakko. In 1889, she became the first principal at Yamanashi Eiwa Girls’ School in Kofu. She returned to Canada on furlough from 1892 to 1893, and spoke to women's church groups about her work.

After she married, Coates taught Sunday School classes, taught her own six children, and assisted her husband's work. While they lived in Hamamatsu, she experimented with peanuts as a protein-rich dietary supplement. She made peanut-based dishes a feature of the menus at Kobe's Canadian Academy while she was matron there. In time, she helped establish a peanut butter manufacturing plant, and consulted on child nutrition for the city of Nagoya. In 1903, she and other missionary wives including Eleanor Frothingham Haworth established the Tokyo School for Foreign Children, mainly serving missionary and diplomatic families.

She lived in Canada with her younger children from 1913 to 1917, and again from 1921 to 1926. As a widow after 1934, Coates did nutritional research in Tokyo with Tadasu Saiki at the Imperial Government Institute for Nutrition. Coates moved away from traditional Christianity and explored alternatives including theosophy, Bahá'í, and New Thought. She wrote articles for a Japanese women's magazine, taught at a girls' school run by journalist Hani Motoko, and sent pro-Japan letters to Canadian newspapers and friends during the 1930s. In 1936 she spent time in a sanitarium in Battle Creek, Michigan. In 1939 she was an honored guest at the fiftieth anniversary celebrations at Yamanashi Eiwa Girls' School. Against her grown children's pleas and Japanese wartime orders, she refused to leave Japan after the attack on Pearl Harbor.

== Publications ==
- The Sure Road to Health, or What Can Be Learned From the Nutrition Laboratory (1931)

== Personal life ==
Wintemute married fellow Canadian Methodist teacher Harper Havelock Coates in Vancouver in 1893. They had six children. Their elder son Wells Coates became a noted architect. Their younger son Willson H. Coates was a Rhodes Scholar, and a history professor in the United States. Her husband died in 1934, and she died in at a temporary hospital in the Surugadai district of Tokyo in 1945, at the age of 81.
