= Wells Coates =

Canadian architect (1895–1958)

Wells Coates OBE RDI
- Born: December 17, 1895; Tokyo, Japan
- Died: June 17, 1958 (aged 62); Vancouver, British Columbia, Canada
- Education: University of British Columbia, East London College
- Occupation: Architect
- Parent: Sarah Agnes Wintemute Coates

Wells Wintemute Coates OBE RDI (December 17, 1895 – June 17, 1958) was an architect, designer and writer. He was, for most of his life, an expatriate Canadian who is best known for his work in England, the most notable of which is the Modernist block of flats known as the Isokon building in Hampstead, London.

== Early years ==
The oldest of six children, Wells Coates was born in Tokyo, Japan, on December 17, 1895, to Methodist missionaries Sarah Agnes Wintemute Coates (1864–1945) and Harper Havelock Coates (1865–1934).

The young man's desire to be an architect was inspired by his mother, who had herself studied architecture under Louis Sullivan and planned one of the first missionary schools in Japan.

Coates spent his youth in the Far East, and voyaged around the world with his father in 1913. He served in World War I, first as a gunner and later as a pilot with the Royal Air Force. He attended the University of British Columbia where he obtained a BA degree in May 1920 and a BSc degree in May 1922, and in October 1922 he registered at East London College where he studied engineering (obtaining a PhD in 1924). Among his first jobs in England was as a journalist and then with the design firm of Adams and Thompson in 1924. He established his own firm in 1928.

His childhood experiences in Japan would play an important role in his aesthetic sensibility that he brought to his architectural work, and this sensibility found a fitting outlet in the Modernist Movement, then current in Europe. He attended the 1933 Congrès International d'Architecture Moderne (CIAM), which produced the famous Athens Charter, and was one of the founders, with Maxwell Fry, of the Modern Architectural Research Group (MARS), the British wing of CIAM.

Between 1932 and 1936 Coates was in partnership with an English architect David Pleydell-Bouverie and designed together the Sunspan House for the 1934 Daily Mail Ideal Home Exhibition held at Olympia, London.

== Role as a Modernist ==
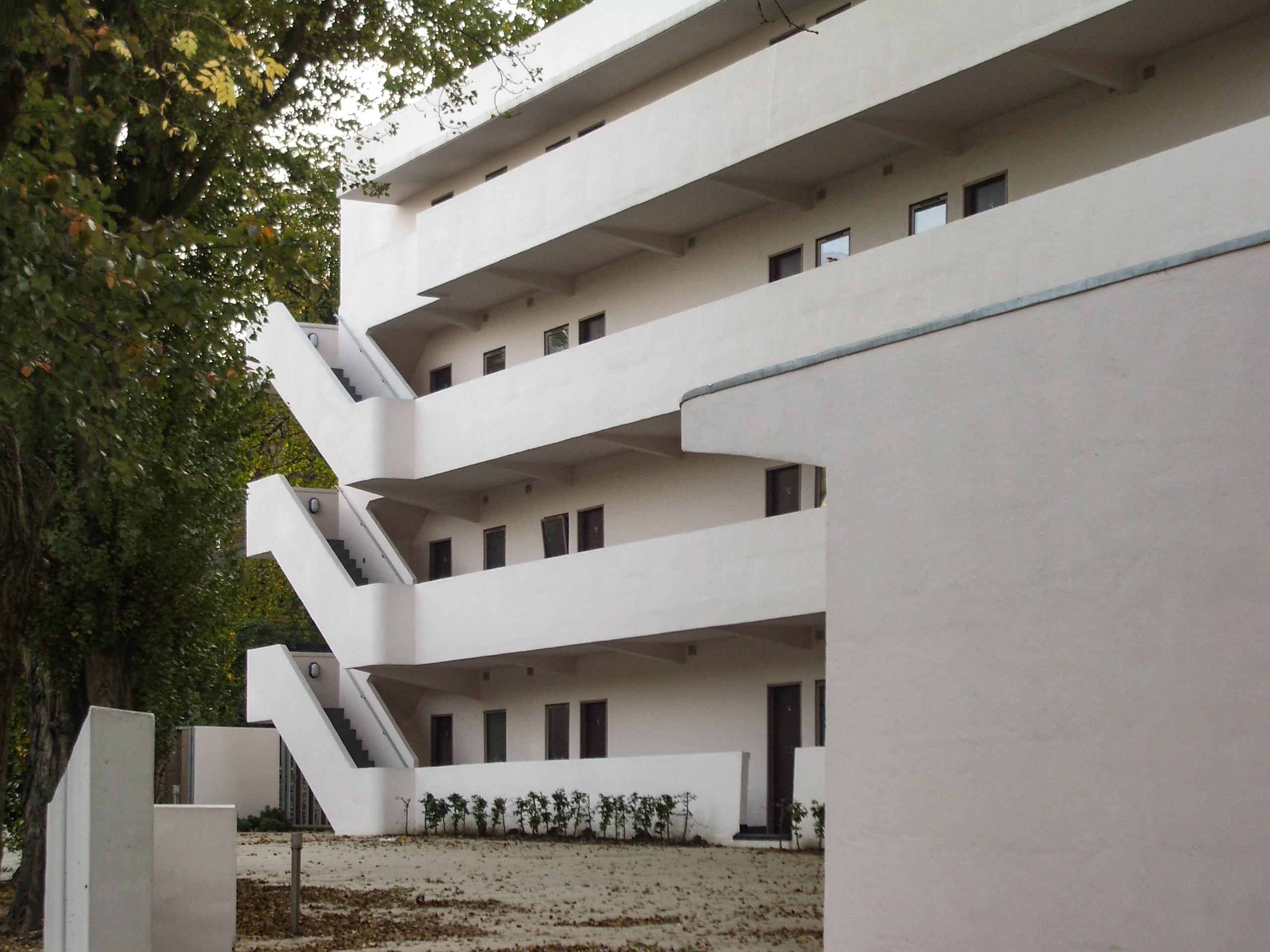
The Isokon Building

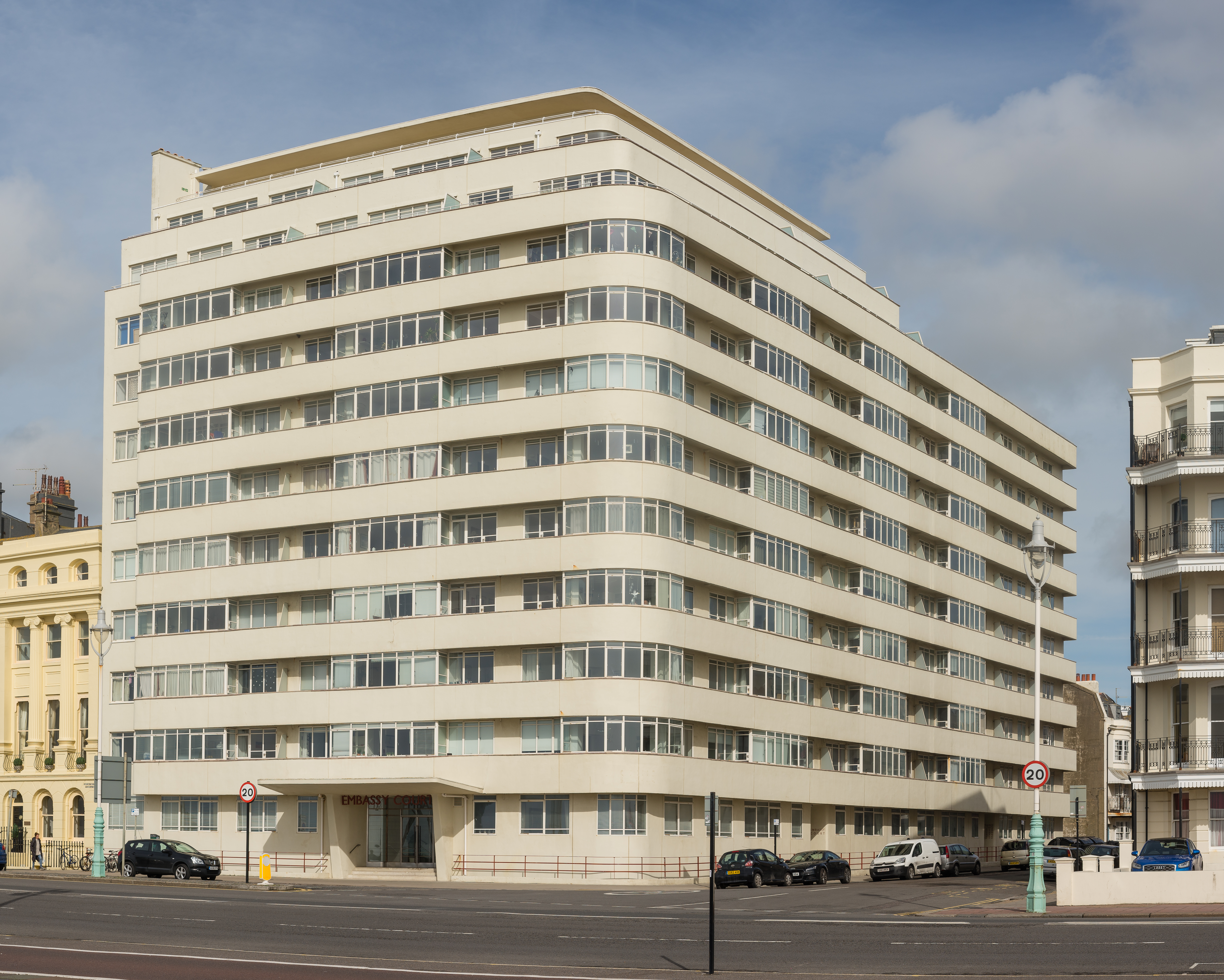
Embassy Court in Brighton

Wells embraced Le Corbusier's architectural mantra that buildings should be 'machines for living' (machine à habiter). This ideal was best-reflected in his Isokon building (also known as Lawn Road Flats), completed in 1934. Indeed, the architectural critic J.M. Richards suggested that he improved on Corbusier, coming "nearer to the machine à habiter than anything Corbusier ever designed". The building was compared to the exterior of an ocean liner by the novelist Agatha Christie, who lived there for a time, so clean and striking was the design.

The apartment building was the brainchild of Jack and Molly Pritchard, who in 1931 established a design firm featuring Modernist architecture and furniture. With simple living spaces strongly influenced by Coates' Japanese experience, and including built-in Isokon furniture, Isokon was "an experiment in collective housing designed for left-wing intellectuals". It became a haven for Germans and Hungarians escaping Nazi persecution and hosted many famous personages including Agatha Christie, Walter Gropius, László Moholy-Nagy, and Marcel Breuer.

Isokon was ahead of its time: it won second place in Horizon Magazine's 'Ugliest Building Competition' in 1946, and would not be recognized as one of England's most important Modernist buildings for another decade. The building fell into disrepair by the 1990s but it changed ownership in 2001 and was fully restored by 2004.

== Later achievements ==
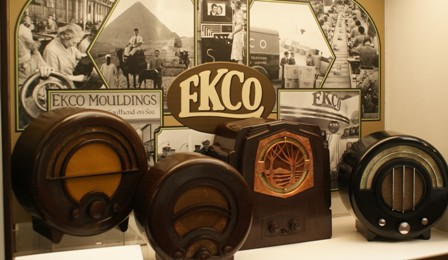
Ekco radio display, showing Coates's most popular design, the AD-65 on the right

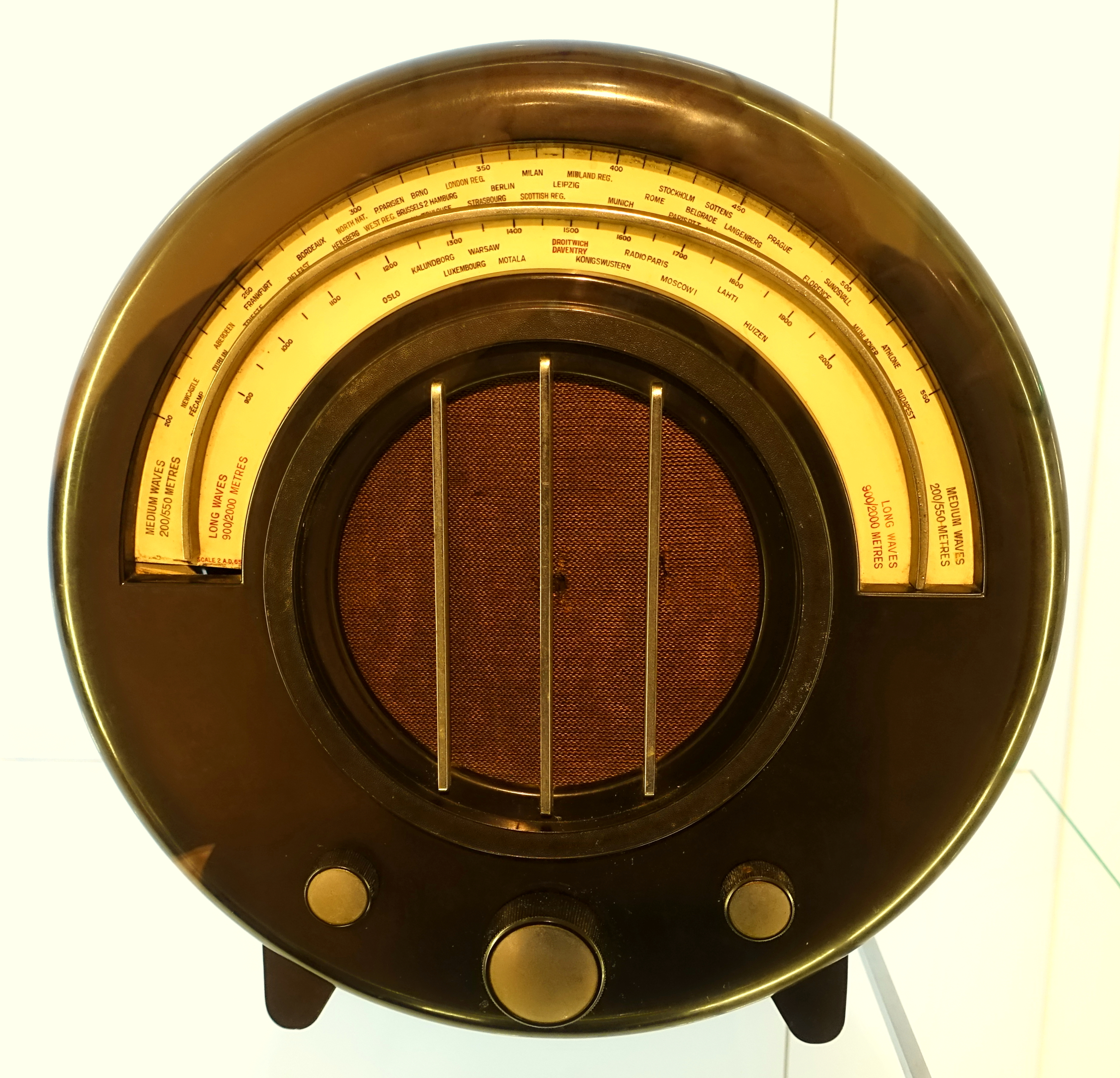
Ekco model AD 65 radio (1932)

An inventive genius, Coates revelled in introducing new ideas in his work. Among his innovations was the '3-2' architectural plan, where two living rooms on one side of the building are equivalent in height to three rooms on the other side, making two units vertically on three floors. in 1928, he designed the "D-handle", an elegantly simple door handle design commonly employed, for example, in Scandinavian furniture. In 1930 he also designed a studio for the British Broadcasting Corporation, and among his technical designs was a microphone stand featuring an overhead counterbalanced arm that enabled the microphone to be moved to any part of the studio while remaining perfectly balanced. The design became a standard piece of equipment at the BBC. Coates also designed the distinctive and influential round bakelite cabinets used by EKCO for some of its radios during the 1930s. Featured in the V&A permanent collection, the Museum notes of the design of Model AD-65: "the severe geometric shape defined the visual vocabulary of radio design for many years".

The thirties were his most prolific era. The Isokon was immediately followed by Embassy Court in Brighton (1935) and 10 Palace Gate, Kensington (1939). These were the only apartment buildings he would design. He also had several private home commissions.

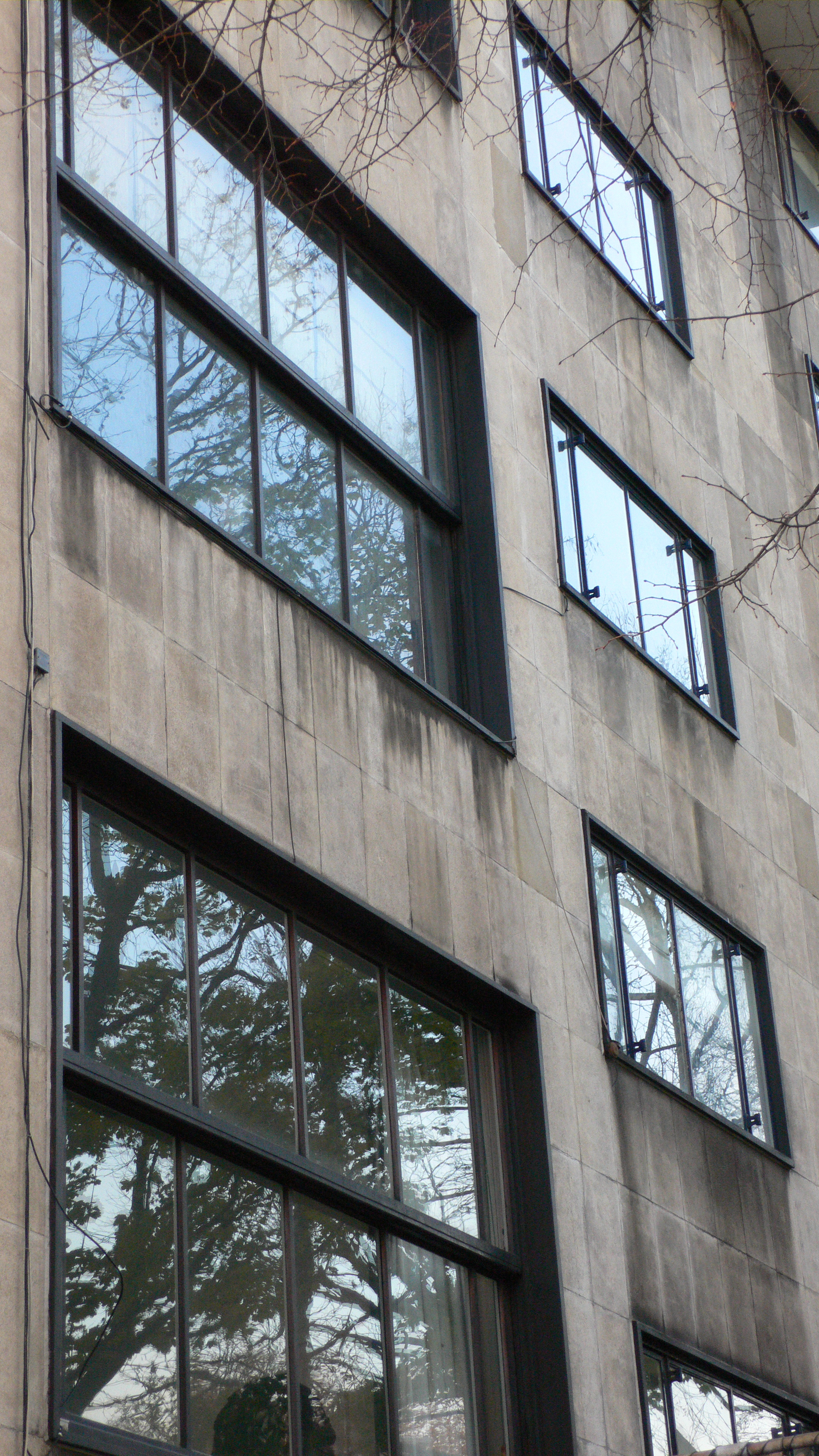
This view of 10 Palace Gate illustrates Coates' 3-2 architectural plan.

During World War II, he again served with the RAF, this time working on fighter aircraft development, for which he was later appointed an Officer of the Order of the British Empire (OBE) in the 1944 New Year Honours. The same year, he was appointed a Royal Designer for Industry (RDI).

Following the war, he, like some other well known architects including Gropius and Breuer (by then working in America), contributed to the British post-War housing effort by introducing an early scheme for modular housing he called Room Unit Production.

In 1949–1950, he designed the building of the Telekinema for the Festival of Britain's South Bank Exhibition. This 400-seat, state-of-the-art cinema, specially designed to screen both film (including the first 3-dimensional films) and large-screen television, proved one of the most popular attractions of the South Bank Exhibition in the summer of 1951. Operated and programmed by the British Film Institute, it re-opened as the National Film Theatre in October 1952, until its demolition in 1957 as the NFT was relocated a stone's throw away from its original site, under Waterloo Bridge.

He also designed a remarkable boat, called the Wingsail. It had a rigid sail design mounted on a catamaran hull. Though he formed a company to market the design, it was not a success, as both the sail and the catamaran were ahead of their time.

He is less well known for his planning work. In 1937, he undertook planning for a slum clearance in Britain (not implemented). In Canada (1952–54) he prepared plans for Iroquois New Town on the St. Lawrence River in eastern Ontario which were also not implemented (the design was awarded to others). He also prepared plans for a Toronto Island Redevelopment Project, and was a participant in the Project 58 urban redevelopment scheme for Vancouver.

== Final years in Canada ==
Coates began coming back to Canada in the early 1950s, about the time of the Iroquois project, finally settling there in 1957. In 1955 and 1956, he taught at the Graduate School of Design at Harvard with Walter Gropius but he was not happy there. He returned to Vancouver after two years, where he worked on Project 58. His last assignment was to design a monorail rapid transit system for Vancouver, dubbed the Monospan Twin-Ride System (MTRS). Once again, he was ahead of his time. The project was abandoned, but would be rejuvenated years later in another form known as SkyTrain.

Wells Coates died of a heart attack in Vancouver on June 17, 1958, at the age of 62. Coates was married to Marion Grove in 1927. They had one child, Laura, and separated in 1937. Coates' grandson is Matt Black of the electronic music duo Coldcut.
