= Susan Groag Bell =

Czech-American pioneer in Women's Studies

- Born: Susan E. M. Groag; 25 January 1926; Opava, Czechoslovakia
- Died: 24 June 2015 (aged 89); Palo Alto, California
- Other names: Susan Barrington, Susan Bell
- Occupations: historian, women's history pioneer
- Years active: 1970–2014
- Known for: creating one of the first women's history textbooks in the United States
- Spouse: Robert Bell

Susan Groag Bell (25 January 1926 – 24 June 2015) was a Czech-American pioneer in Women's Studies. At a time when there were no academic courses nor textbooks, offered in women's history, Bell compiled images of women's participation in society from artworks and began presenting lectures to present roles women had held in society. In 1971, a year after the first women's studies course was offered in the United States, Bell taught her own class on the subject and prepared a reading guide for the course which would become one of the first textbooks to treat women's history from an academic perspective. She taught and researched for more than four decades as an independent scholar at the Clayman Institute for Gender Research. Posthumously, a conference named in her honor was held at Stanford University and a plaque recognizing her contributions to women's history was dedicated by the history department of Stanford.

== Early life ==
Susan Groag was born on 25 January 1926 in Opava, in the German-speaking Sudetenland area of Czechoslovakia. Her father was a lawyer and both of her parents had Jewish heritage, though they converted to Lutheranism. In 1938, when the Germans annexed Sudetenland, Groag was no longer allowed to go to school. To protect his wife and daughter, Groag's father arranged a visa for his wife to work as a domestic in England, and dispatched them via train from Prague in January 1939. While her mother worked as a maid, they tried to arrange a visa for Groag's father, but were unsuccessful. He was unable to leave Czechoslovakia and was one of the victims of the Theresienstadt concentration camp.

Groag attended a boarding school in Haywards Heath and upon graduating in 1943, she moved to Wales where she attended a high school program developed by the Czech government-in-exile. The curricula was designed to train students to help rebuild their homeland. When the war ended in 1945, Groag returned to Czechoslovakia with her classmates. Unable to reconcile her memories with the post-war reality, or identify with the nationalist aims of the country, within a year, Groag returned to London, where her mother had remained. Sidelined until 1950 by illness, in the second half of that year Groag married Alfred E. Barrington in Chelsea and moved to the United States in October. After a few years, the Barringtons divorced and in 1960, Groag married Ronald Bell, a physicist who lived in Woodside, California.

== Career ==
Proximity to Stanford University, led Bell to pursue a long-held dream to earn a university education and she graduated in 1964 with a Bachelor of Arts in history. She applied for Stanford's PhD program but was denied entry because she was too old and instead earned a master's degree in history from Santa Clara University in 1970. Her dissertation focused on the lives of Elizabeth Gaskell, Caroline Herschel, Mary Somerville, and Frances Trollope, four women whose careers began later in their lives and who succeeded without formal education. During her studies, in the late 1960s, Bell began presenting lectures for the speaker's bureau, Women Perspectives. The lectures focused on women as depicted as subjects of western art over the previous two millennia. Centering her talks around images she had organized into a slide projection show, Bell's lectures used a wide range of source materials from medieval manuscript illuminations to gardening imagery to demonstrate women's work, status, and roles in society over time.

The socio-political events of the late 1960s including the civil rights movement, anti-Vietnam War movement, and women's liberation movement led to pressure on academic institutions to add courses on women's studies which rejected the notion that women were second class citizens. The first academic treatment of women's experiences as a field of study in the United States was launched at San Diego State University in 1970. The following year, Bell developed a women's studies course for Cañada College. Lacking textbooks, she prepared a reading guide which was published as a textbook, Women, from the Greeks to the French Revolution, in 1973 and reprinted in 1980. She lectured in the history department of Santa Clara University and traveled throughout the country presenting women's history lectures from Bryn Mawr College to the University of New Mexico.

In the late 1970s, Bell joined with other scholars at Stanford's Center for Research on Women (CROW), now the Clayman Institute for Gender Research, to form a network of independent women scholars. She was one of the first affiliated scholars of CROW and later was appointed as a permanent senior scholar. In 1982, Bell published Medieval Women Book Owners: Arbiters of Lay Piety and Ambassadors of Culture in Signs. In the article, she argued that noble women in medieval society, operating within their own socially defined roles became catalysts for cultural change, through their relationship to books. Teaching their children and commissioning books for them; influencing devotional publishers to write Books of Hours in vernacular languages rather than Latin; and bringing their books with them to new courts upon marriage were all ways in which women participated in cultural exchange. The book became widely influential and inspired other scholars to analyze how women were obscured in historical records.

For more than four decades, Bell worked as an independent scholar at the Clayman Institute. In addition to her own publishing, she collaborated on such works as Women, the Family, and Freedom: The Debate in the Documents: 1750-1950 with Karen Offen. Published in 1983, the work presented translated documents related to the debates that occurred in the period on whether women should lead public or traditional lives. On the basis of its scholarship, Bell and Offen created training seminars for Stanford, and Bell and Barbara Gelpi taught a Stanford/Oxford seminar series focused on British gender depictions. In 1986 she co-edited with Marilyn Yalom, Revealing Lives: Autobiography, Biography, and Gender and in 1991, wrote her own memoir, Between Worlds: Czechoslovakia, England, and America. Her final major published work, The Lost Tapestries of the City of Ladies (2004) traced the journey to unsuccessfully locate tapestries owned by various European royal houses which depicted imagery from Christine de Pizan's Le Livre de la cité des dames and how the tapestries survived even when Pizan's writing had fallen into obscurity.

== Death and legacy ==
Bell died on 24 June 2015 at her home in Palo Alto, California. In January 2016, a conference was hosted by the Clayman Institute to pay homage to her contributions to women's history and in June 2016 a plaque was dedicated by the history department of Stanford University in her honor. Part of Bell's papers (1978-1982) are housed in the special collections of the Stanford University Libraries. In 2017, the Association of Art Historians hosted a conference in the UK at Loughborough University to evaluate the legacy of Bell's Medieval Women Book Owners, thirty-five years after its initial publication. That same year, Stanford University Press launched the Susan Groag Bell Publication Fund in Women's History to support the "publication of outstanding books in the field of women’s history".
