= Ernest Race =

English textile and furniture designer (1913–1964)

- Born: 1913; Newcastle upon Tyne, England
- Died: 1964 (aged 50–51); London, England
- Known for: Textile and furniture design
- Notable work: BA3 aluminum chair; Antelope chair
- Style: Mid-century modern

Ernest Race (1913-1964) was an English textile and furniture designer, born in Newcastle upon Tyne in 1913, and died in 1964 in London. His best-known designs are the BA3 aluminium chair of 1945 and the Antelope, designed for the Festival of Britain in 1951. The BA3 won a gold medal at the 10th Milan Trienale in 1954, where the Antelope also won a silver medal. He was made a Royal Designer for Industry in 1953.
