= Geller House I =

Modernist house in Lawrence, New York (1945–2022)

Coordinates: 40.600979°N 73.724142°W

Geller I in the mid-1940s

Geller House I was a Modernist house in Lawrence, New York. The house was one of the first American works by architect Marcel Breuer, designed in 1945. It was controversially demolished in 2022. It was one of the first to employ Breuer's concept of the "binuclear" house, with separate wings for the bedrooms and for the living/dining/kitchen area, separated by an entry hall, and with the distinctive "butterfly" roof (two opposing roof surfaces sloping towards the middle, centrally drained) that became part of the popular modernist style vocabulary.

In 1950, Jackson Pollock was commissioned to paint a mural for the interior of the house. Phyllis Geller reportedly hated the mural. Later, when the property was sold, the painting was worth more than the house.

The house was eligible for the National Register of Historic Places as a contributing property in the Rockaway Hunt Historic District.
