= Jack Pritchard (furniture designer) =

British furniture entrepreneur

- Born: 8 June 1899
- Died: 27 April 1992 (aged 92)
- Occupation: Architect, businessperson, furniture designer

John Craven "Jack" Pritchard (8 June 1899 – 27 April 1992) was a British furniture entrepreneur, who was very influential between the First and Second World Wars. His work is exhibited in the Victoria and Albert Museum and the Museum of London. He was a member of the Design and Industries Association.

== Life ==
Pritchard was born in Hampstead, London, the son of Clive Fleetwood Pritchard, a successful barrister, and a descendant of Andrew Pritchard, businessman and scientist. He was educated at Oundle School and Pembroke College, Cambridge.

In 1924, Pritchard married Rosemary (Molly) Cooke, a psychiatrist (1900–1985); they had two sons, Jonathan and Jeremy, born in 1926 and 1928. Jack also had a daughter, Jennifer, with Beatrix Tudor Hart, a pioneering educator.

For many years, he and his wife lived in the famous Lawn Road Flats, also known as the Isokon Flats. They later retired to a house also named Isokon on Dunwich Road, Blythburgh, Suffolk, designed by Jennifer and her husband Colin Jones. Pritchard died in Blythburgh and is buried there.

== Isokon ==
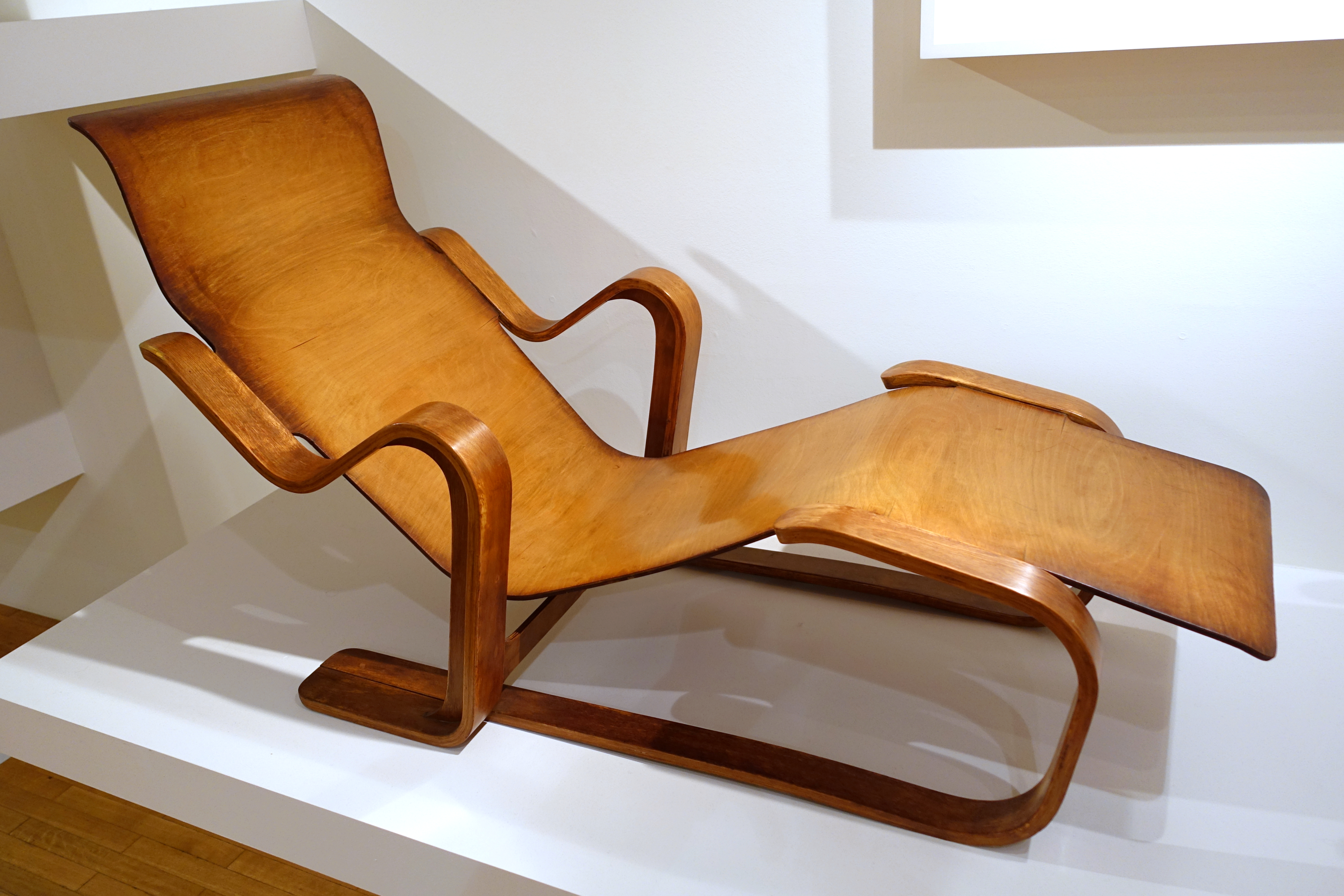
Isokon reclining chair designed by Marcel Breuer (1935)

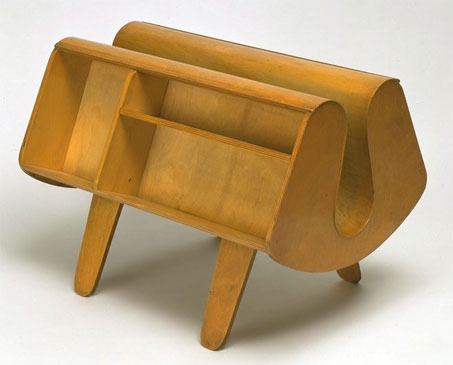
Isokon Penguin Donkey bookcase designed by Egon Riss (1939)

The London-based Isokon firm was founded in 1929 to design and construct modernist houses and flats, and subsequently furniture and fittings for them. Originally called Wells Coates and Partners, the name was changed in 1931 to Isokon, a name derived from Isometric Unit Construction, bearing an allusion to Russian Constructivism. Unusually for a design company, its directors were the bacteriologist and later psychiatrist Molly Pritchard, the solicitor Frederick Graham-Maw, son of Frederick James Maw, the founder of the law firm Rowe and Maw, the economist Robert S Spicer, as well as Coates and Pritchard. In reality, the company was run by Pritchard, whose initial involvement was to handle the economics, publicity and marketing, but who later went on to hire designers and direct the company after Coates left. Pritchard had become the British marketing manager for the large plywood company Venesta (short for veneer Estonia) in 1926, which had 5,000 employees and a factory and wharf in Silvertown, East London as well as offices in the City of London. Pritchard had hired Charlotte Perriand through Le Corbusier to design a trade fair stand for the company at Olympia, London in 1929. Despite his involvement with Lawn Road Flats and the Isokon company, Pritchard continued to work for Venesta until 1936. The Isokon furniture was mainly manufactured at A M Luther in Tallinn, an Estonian company that owned 50% of Venesta and was Europe's largest plywood manufacturer in the first half of the 20th century. The Isokon company was never commercially successful. The end came with the outbreak of World War II when its supply of plywood from A M Luther was cut off due to the Soviet invasion of Estonia and A M Luther was confiscated. Isokon ceased production in 1939 but the company was restarted by Pritchard in 1963, now with production in Britain. Since 1982, the furniture is made by Isokon Plus, formerly known as Windmill Furniture, with the approval of the Pritchard family.

== Lawn Road Flats ==
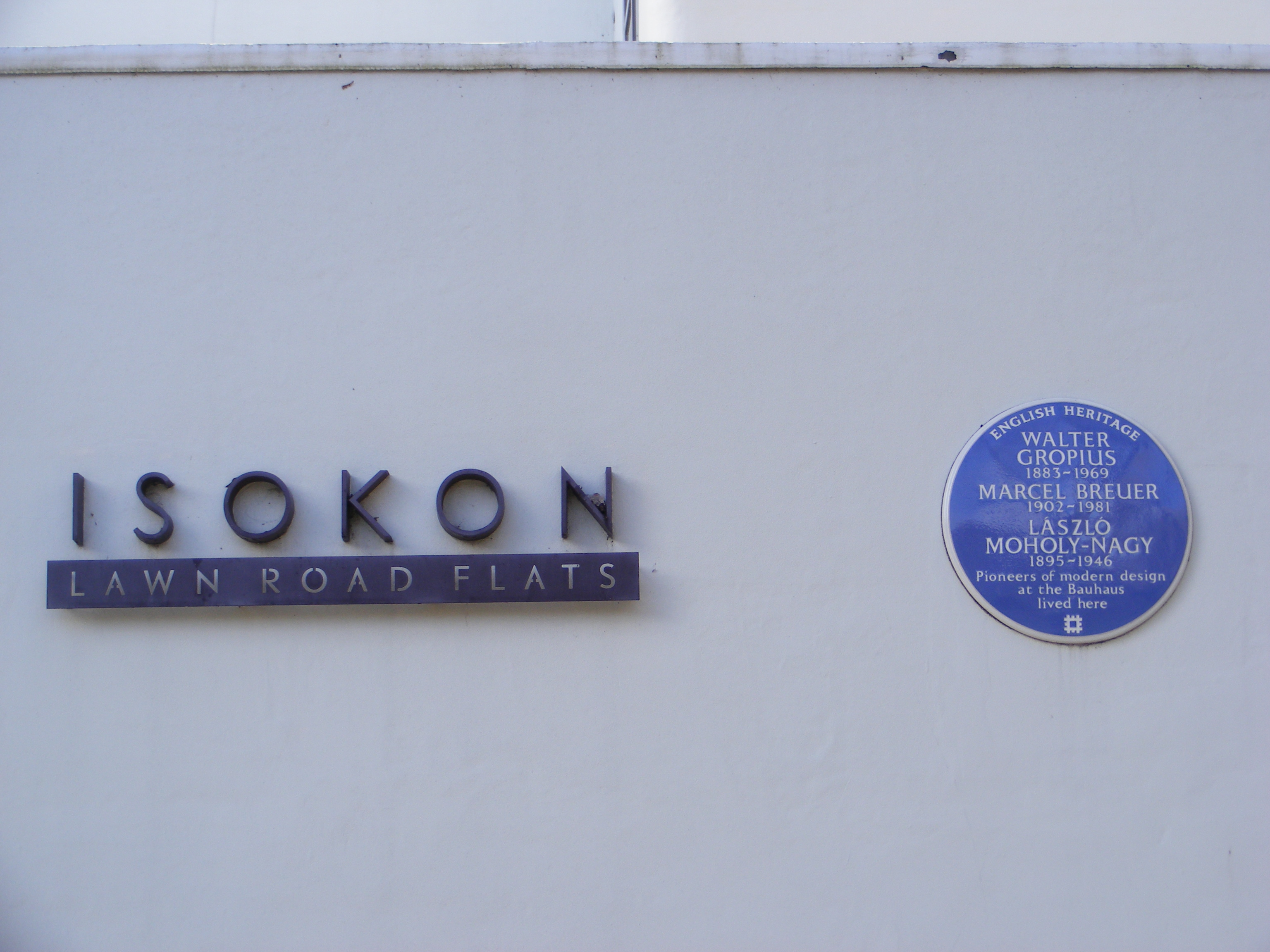
Isokon building blue plaque

Isokon's key project was the Lawn Road Flats in Hampstead, since 1972 named Isokon Flats, which was formally opened on 9 July 1934. It was designed by the Canadian architect Wells Coates after a brief by Molly Pritchard, based on the Minimum Flat concept stated at the CIAM conference of 1929. In March 1931, Wells Coates, Jack Pritchard and Serge Chermayeff had visited Germany to view new housing developments, including the Bauhaus in Dessau, which had a large influence. The building process of Lawn Road Flats and the opening event was photographed by Edith Tudor Hart who was educated at the Bauhaus school in Dessau. Intended to be the last word in contemporary modernist living, the block of flats was aimed at young professionals. It contained 22 single flats, four double flats, three studio flats, staff quarters, kitchens and a large garage. Services included shoe cleaning, laundry, bed making and food sent up by a dumb waiter at the spine of the building. In 1937, a restaurant and bar designed by Marcel Breuer and Maxwell Fry named the Isobar – located on the ground floor with a decked outdoor area – was added to the complex. Its first manager was Philip Harben, who after World War II became the first TV celebrity chef at the BBC. Pritchard also set up a supper club called The Half Hundred Club, so named because it could have no more than 25 members who could bring 25 guests. They dined either at the Isobar, at Pritchard's penthouse flat in the Isokon building or at more exotic locations, such as London Zoo.

The flats and the Isobar became famous as a centre for intellectual life in north London. Residents included the novelist Agatha Christie and her husband, the archeologist Max Mallowan, the Soviet NKVD spy master Arnold Deutsch who recruited the Cambridge Five, the German born economist and Soviet spy Jürgen Kuczynski, the author Nicholas Monsarrat, ethnomusicologist Erich Moritz von Hornbostel, architect Jacques Groag and his wife, textile designer Jacqueline Groag, architects Egon Riss and Arthur Korn and the author Adrian Stokes. The British architects Sir James Stirling and Alec Bright, later director of the Museo del Oro in Bogotá, Colombia were resident during the 1960s. Regulars at the Isobar included the sculptors Henry Moore, Barbara Hepworth and Naum Gabo and the painter Ben Nicholson as well as Sir Julian Huxley.

Pritchard remained in London during World War II while Molly Pritchard and their children Jonathan and Jeremy left for the United States where she moved in with Walter Gropius and his wife Ise, while the children attended a boarding school in Canada. The building was popular as a residence during the war due to being made out of reinforced concrete, and despite near bombs, survived the Blitz. It was repainted brown during the war as it was feared its white surface could serve as a guide for German bombers. In 1955, Pritchard staged a 21st birthday party for the building on its roof top terrace. Philip Harben returned to make the food, architectural writer Nikolaus Pevsner made a speech and letters from Walter Gropius and Marcel Breuer were read out. Wells Coates and many pre-World War II residents attended the event, as well as designers Robin Day and Lucienne Day and architects Alison and Peter Smithson.

The building was sold by Pritchard in 1969 to the magazine New Statesman, who demolished the Isobar and made it into flats. They then sold the building on to Camden Council in 1972 for twice the price. The building was listed Grade II in 1974 by English Heritage and listed Grade I in 1999. Despite this, it received very poor maintenance from Camden Council and deteriorated badly. During this period it was partly used to house single men with drug, alcohol and mental health problems. After a long campaign to save the building, it was sold to the housing association Notting Hill Housing Group in 2003, in a joint bid with the modernist building conservation firm Avanti Architects, headed up by architect John Allan, with the pledge that a museum would open in the building. It now contains 36 flats, most that are owned on equity sharing basis by key workers such as nurses and teachers. In July 2014, the building's garage was converted into a gallery space with a permanent exhibition that tells the story of the building, its residents and the Isokon company. It is operated by the not-for-profit charitable Isokon Gallery Trust and is open 11am to 4 pm each Saturday and Sunday from early March until the end of October every year.

== Bauhaus in Britain ==
In 1935, Walter Gropius, the founder of the Bauhaus, became Controller of Design for The Isokon Furniture Company. He had arrived in England on 18 October 1934 with his wife Ise Gropius, and later their adopted daughter Ati joined them. Gropius lived in flat 15 at Lawn Road Flats until March 1937, when they left for the United States for Gropius to become Professor of Architecture at Harvard University. A month before he left for the US, Gropius recommended Marcel Breuer, a former colleague at the Bauhaus who had moved into flat 16 in the building in early 1935, as his replacement as Controller of Design. The furniture Breuer designed whilst at Isokon are highly influential pieces of modernism, and included chairs, tables and the Long and Short Chair.

László Moholy-Nagy, another former Bauhaus teacher who also lived briefly in the building with his wife Sibyl Moholy-Nagy, became involved with Isokon when he arrived in Britain from Germany in May 1935. Moholy-Nagy designed promotional material for the Isokon Furniture Company, including sales leaflets, showcards and the logo of the Isokon firm itself, which was an outline of curved plywood chair. He later formed The New Bauhaus in Chicago.

The fourth Bauhaus teacher at Lawn Road Flats was Naum Slutzky, a Russian born goldsmith who had worked at the school in Weimar. He remained in Britain for the rest of his life.

== Isokon furniture revival ==
Pritchard revived the Isokon company in 1963 after his retirement. Changes in the manufacture of plywood meant a redesign of some of the key pieces in the Isokon portfolio, for which Pritchard hired Ernest Race, former furniture designer for the Festival of Britain. In 1968, Pritchard licensed John Alan Designs, based in Camden, London to produce the Long Chair, Nesting Tables and the Isokon Penguin Donkey Mark 2 designed by Ernest Race, which the company did until 1980. The Isokon Penguin Donkey Mark 2 became a sales success due to the support of Allen Lane, the founder of Penguin Books. In 1982, Chris McCourt of Windmill Furniture was granted the license to manufacture the historical Isokon furniture pieces by Pritchard. From 1999, the Isokon furniture was sold through his renamed company Isokon Plus, first based in Chiswick, West London and from 2014 in Hackney Wick, East London. The company was later sold to VG&P, which retained the Isokon Plus brand. The first furniture to be added to the Isokon portfolio since 1963 was designed by the duo Barber Osgerby in 1996. Edward Barber and Jay Osgerby had recently graduated from the Royal College of Art when they designed their first piece, the Loop Table. The bent plywood design was to be the first of several furniture pieces that the designers created for Isokon Plus, the most recent the Bodleian Chair for the University of Oxford's historic Bodleian Libraries.

== Publications ==
- J. Pritchard, View from a Long Chair – the Memoirs of Jack Pritchard, Sydney, Australia : Law Book Co of Australasia, 1984. ISBN 978-0710202314
- Darling, Elizabeth. 2012. Wells Coates. London: RIBA Enterprises. ISBN 978-1859464373.
- Burke, David. 2014. The Lawn Road Flats: Spies, Writers and Artists. London: Boydell Press. ISBN 978-1843837831.
- Daybelge, Leyla and Englund, Magnus. 2019. Isokon and the Bauhaus in Britain. London: Batsford. ISBN 978-1849944915.
- 8 Powers, Alan. 2019. Bauhaus Goes West. London: Thames & Hudson. ISBN 978-0500519929.
- MacCarthy, Fiona. 2019. Walter Gropius: Visionary Founder of the Bauhaus. London: Faber & Faber. ISBN 978-0571295135.

== References and sources ==
Sources

- Grieve, Alastair. 2004. Isokon: For Ease, For Ever. London: Isokon Plus. ISBN 0-9548676-0-2
- Jack Pritchard — The Pritchard Papers, UEA Norwich
- John Craven Pritchard (Jack) — Archives Hub
- Isokon at Blythburgh — Alan Mackley
- Isokon Designers — Isokon Plus
