= Marcel Breuer =

Hungarian-American architect and designer (1902–1981)

- Breuer in 1970
- Born: Marcel Lajos Breuer; May 21, 1902; Pécs, Austria-Hungary
- Died: July 1, 1981 (aged 79); New York City, U.S.
- Occupation: Architect
- Awards: AIA Gold Medal (1968)
- Buildings: World Heritage Centre; 945 Madison Avenue; IBM La Gaude; (full list)
- Design: Wassily Chair, Cesca Chair

Marcel Lajos Breuer (/ˈbrɔɪər/ BROY-ur; May 21, 1902 – July 1, 1981) was a Hungarian-born American modernist architect and furniture designer. He moved to the United States in 1937 and became a naturalized American citizen in 1944.

At the Bauhaus he designed the Wassily Chair and the Cesca Chair, which The New York Times have called some of the most important chairs of the 20th century. Breuer extended the sculpture vocabulary he had developed in the carpentry shop at the Bauhaus into a personal architecture that made him one of the world's most popular architects at the peak of 20th-century design. His work includes art museums, libraries, college buildings, office buildings, and residences. Many are in a Brutalist architecture style, including the former IBM Research and Development facility which was the birthplace of the IBM Personal Computer. He is regarded as one of the great innovators of modern furniture design and one of the most-influential exponents of the International Style.

== Life, work and inventions ==
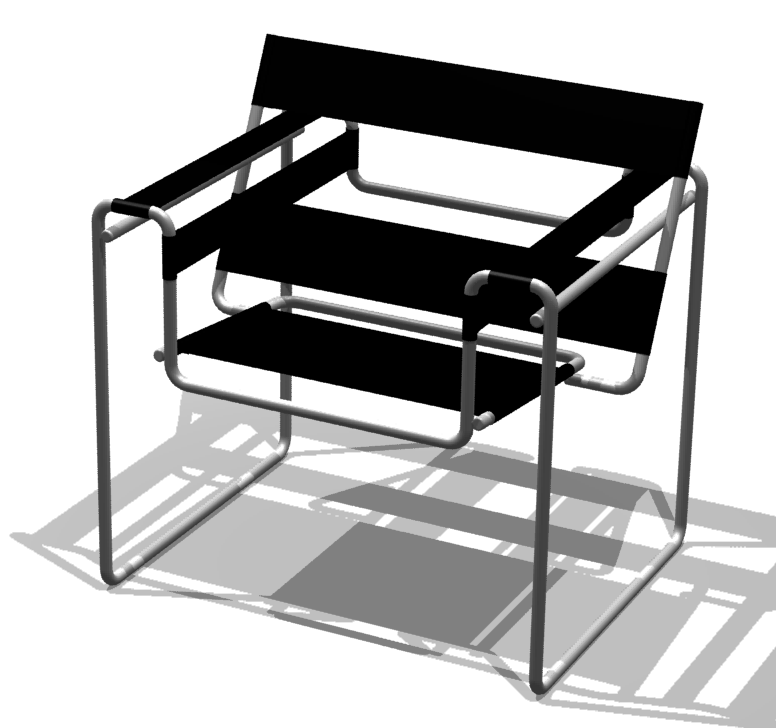
Wassily Chair

Commonly known to his friends and associates as Lajkó (/ˈlaɪkoʊ/ LY-koh; the diminutive of his middle name), Breuer was born in Pécs, Austria-Hungary (now Hungary) to a Hungarian-Jewish family. He was forced to renounce his faith in order to marry Marta Erps due to anti-Semitism in Germany at the time.

=== Bauhaus life ===
Marcel Breuer left his workplace at the age of 18 in search of artistic training and, after a short period spent at the Academy of Fine Arts in Vienna, became one of the first and youngest students at the Bauhaus – a radical arts and crafts school that Walter Gropius had founded in Weimar just after the First World War. He was recognized by Gropius as a significant talent and was quickly put at the head of the Bauhaus carpentry shop. Gropius was to remain a lifelong mentor for a man who was 19 years his junior.

After the school moved from Weimar to Dessau in 1925, Breuer returned from a brief sojourn in Paris to join older faculty members such as Josef Albers, Wassily Kandinsky, and Paul Klee as a Master, eventually teaching in its newly established department of architecture.

Recognized for his invention of bicycle-handlebar-inspired tubular steel furniture, Breuer lived off his design fees at a time in the late 1920s and early 1930s when the architectural commissions he was looking for were few and far between. The structural characteristics of his wooden furniture showed the influence of Dutch designers Gerrit Rietveld and Theo van Doesburg. He was known to such giants as Le Corbusier and Mies van der Rohe, whose architectural vocabulary he was later to adapt as part of his own, but hardly considered an equal by them who were his senior by 15 and 16 years. Despite the widespread popular belief that one of the most famous of Breuer's tubular steel chairs, the Wassily Chair was designed for Breuer's friend Wassily Kandinsky, it was not; Kandinsky admired Breuer's finished chair design, and only then did Breuer make an additional copy for Kandinsky's use in his home. When the chair was re-released in the 1960s, it was named "Wassily" by its Italian manufacturer, who had learned that Kandinsky had been the recipient of one of the earliest post-prototype units.

It was Gropius who assigned Breuer interiors at the 1927 Weissenhof Estate. In 1928 he opened a practice in Berlin, devoted himself to interior design and furniture design and in 1932 he built his first house, the Harnischmacher in Wiesbaden. The house was white, with two floors and a flat roof; part of it and the terraces rose freely on supports.

=== London ===
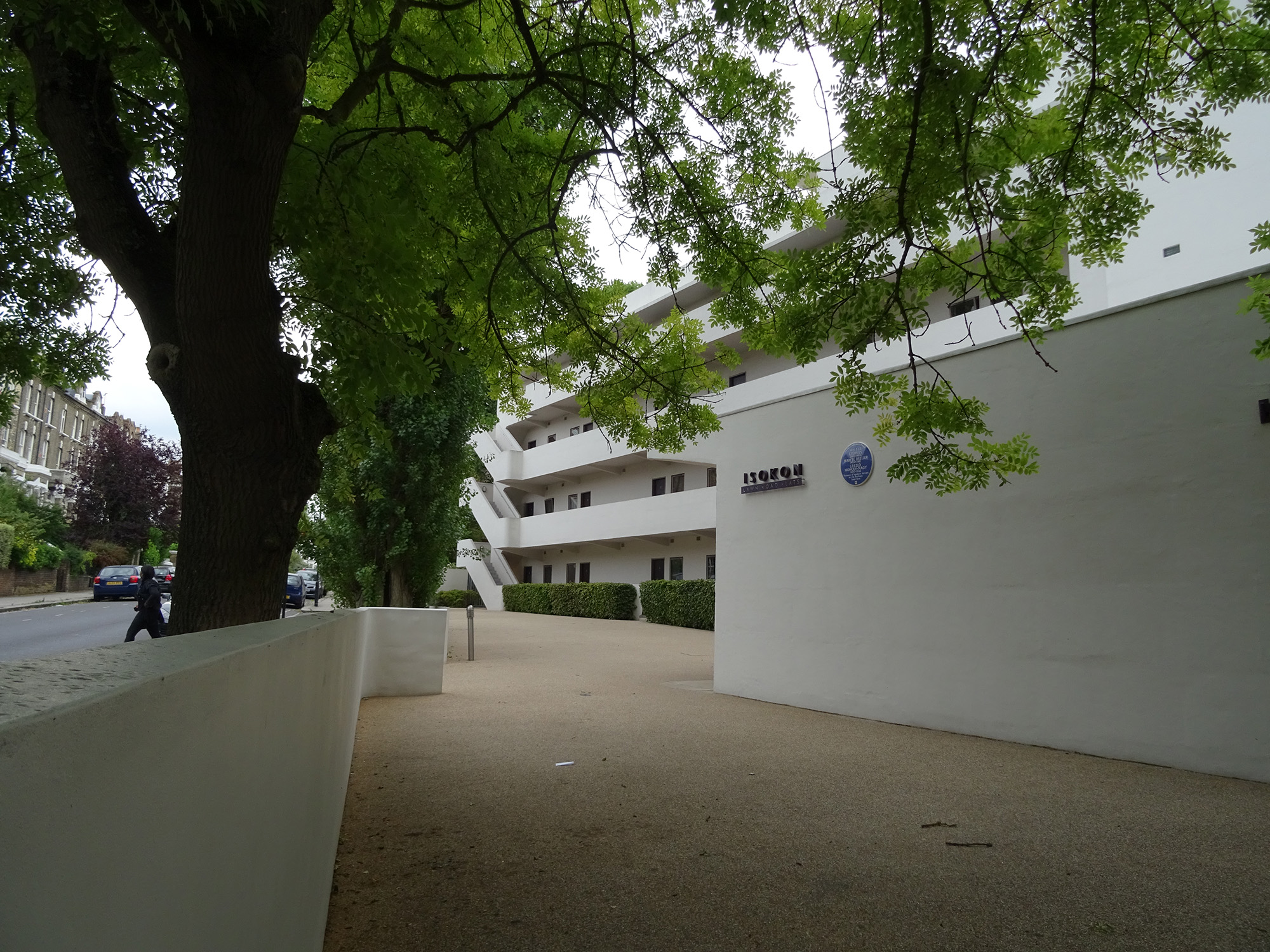
Isokon Flats, Hampstead, London

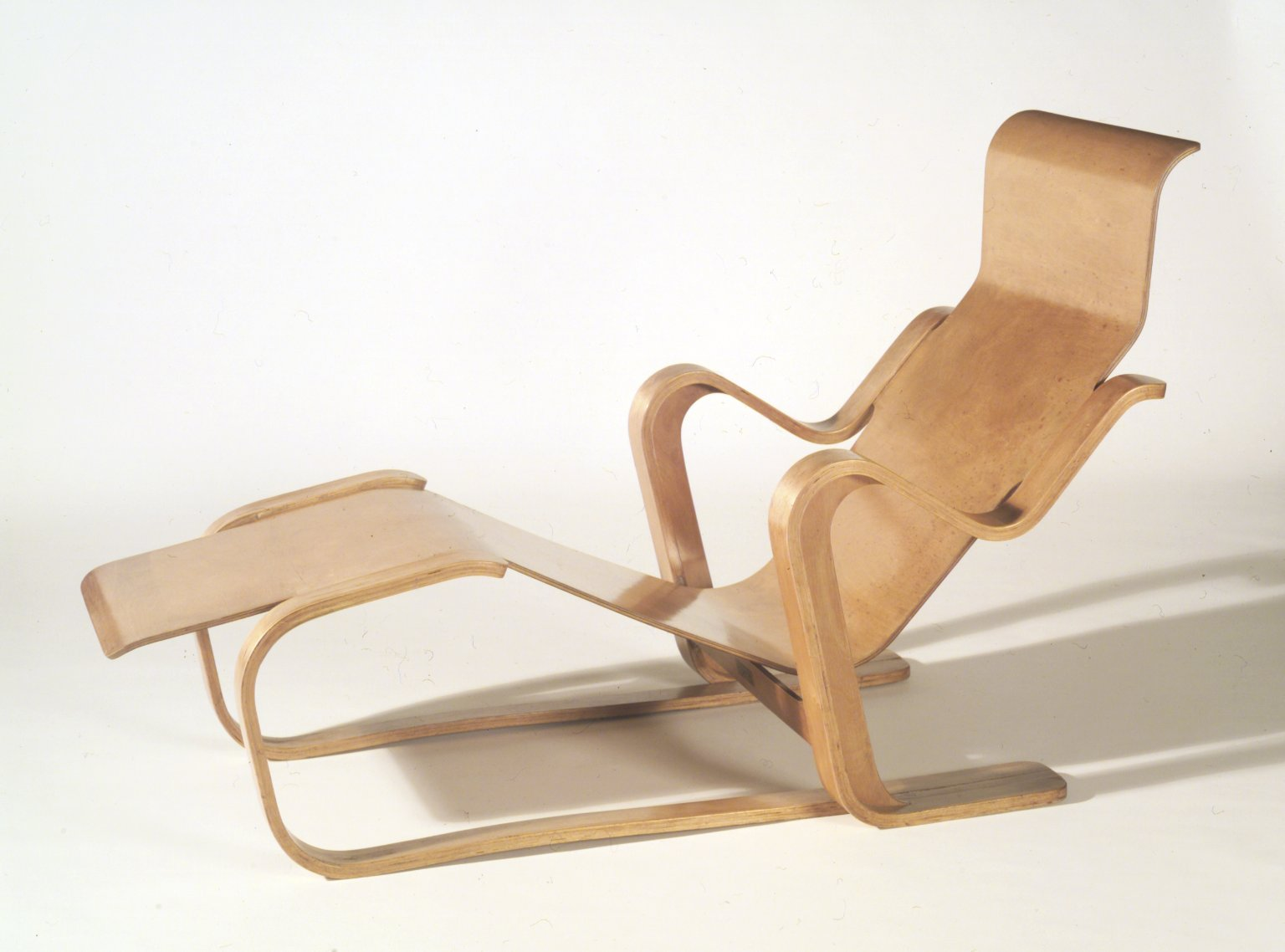
Marcel Breuer. Long Chair, c. 1935–36 Brooklyn Museum

In 1935, at Gropius's suggestion, Breuer relocated to London.

While in London, Breuer was employed by Jack Pritchard at the Isokon company, one of the earliest proponents of modern design in the United Kingdom. Breuer designed his Long Chair as well as experimenting with bent and formed plywood, inspired by designs by Finnish architect Alvar Aalto. Between 1935 and 1937, he worked in practice with the English Modernist F. R. S. Yorke, with whom he designed a number of houses. After a brief time as the Isokon's head of design in 1937, he emigrated to the United States.

=== Massachusetts ===
In 1937, Gropius accepted the appointment as chairman of Harvard's Graduate School of Design and again Breuer followed his mentor to join the faculty in Cambridge, Massachusetts. The two men formed a partnership that was to greatly influence the establishment of an American way of designing modern houses – spread by their great collection of wartime students including Paul Rudolph, Eliot Noyes, I. M. Pei, Ulrich Franzen, John Johansen, and Philip Johnson. One of the most intact examples of Breuer's furniture and interior design work during this period is the Alan I W Frank House in Pittsburgh, designed with Gropius as a Gesamtkunstwerk.

Breuer broke with his father-figure, Walter Gropius, in 1941 over a very minor issue but the major reason may have been to get himself out from under the better-known name that dominated their practice. Breuer had married their secretary, Constance Crocker Leighton, and after a few more years in Cambridge, moved to New York City in 1946 (with Harry Seidler as his chief draftsman) to establish a practice that was centered there for the rest of his life. He became a naturalized American citizen in 1944.

=== New York City ===
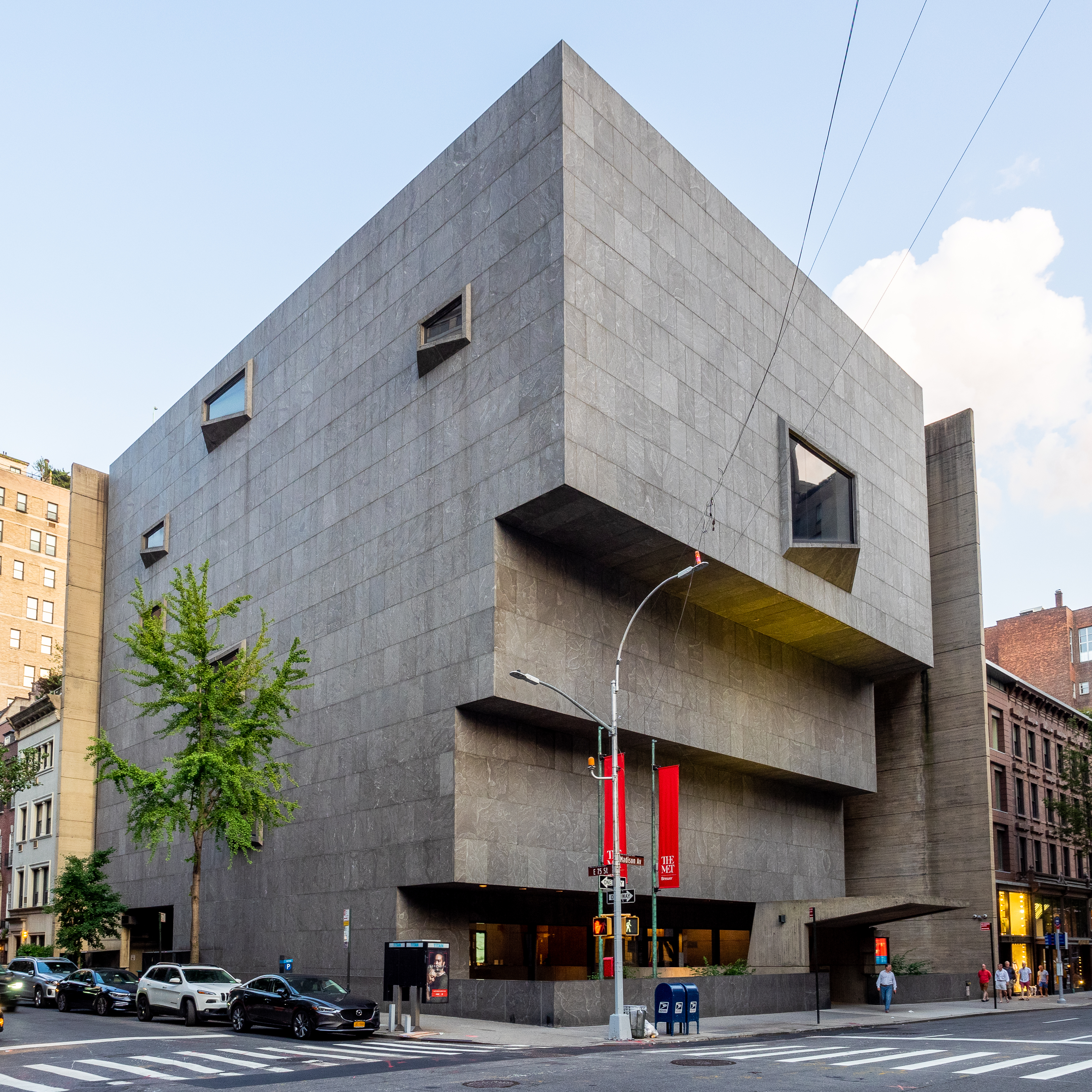
945 Madison Avenue

The Geller House I of 1945 (demolished in 2022) was one of the first to employ Breuer's concept of the 'binuclear' house, with separate wings for the bedrooms and for the living / dining / kitchen area, separated by an entry hall, and with the distinctive 'butterfly' roof (two opposing roof surfaces sloping towards the middle, centrally drained) that became part of the popular modernist style vocabulary. Breuer built two houses for himself in New Canaan, Connecticut: one from 1947 to 1948, and the other from 1951 to 1952. House in the Museum Garden, a demonstration house set up in the MoMA garden in 1949, caused a flurry of interest in the architect's work, and an appreciation written by Peter Blake. When the show was over, the "House in the Garden" was dismantled and barged up the Hudson River for reassembly on the Rockefeller property, Kykuit, in Pocantico Hills, New York. In 1948, Ariston Club, Breuer's only work in Latin America, was built in Mar del Plata, Argentina.

His first two important institutional buildings were the UNESCO Headquarters in Paris, finished in 1955, and the monastic master plan and church at Saint John's Abbey in Minnesota in 1954 (again, in part, on the recommendation of Gropius, a "competitor" for the job, who told the monks they needed a younger man who could finish the job). These commissions were a turning point in Breuer's career: a move to larger projects after years of residential commissions and the beginning of Breuer's adoption of concrete as his primary medium.

Breuer was a supporter of the Council for the Advancement of the Negro in Architecture (CANA) and employed Beverly Lorraine Greene, the first African-American woman to be licensed as an architect in the United States. She is credited as a draftsperson on a number of Breuer's commissions in the 1950s, including the Grosse Pointe Public Library.

In 1966, Breuer completed the Whitney Museum of American Art at 945 Madison Avenue on Manhattan's Upper East Side. The Whitney collection maintained its home in the Breuer-designed building from 1966 to 2014, before moving to a new building designed by Renzo Piano at 99 Gansevoort Street in the West Village/Meatpacking District neighborhoods of Lower Manhattan.

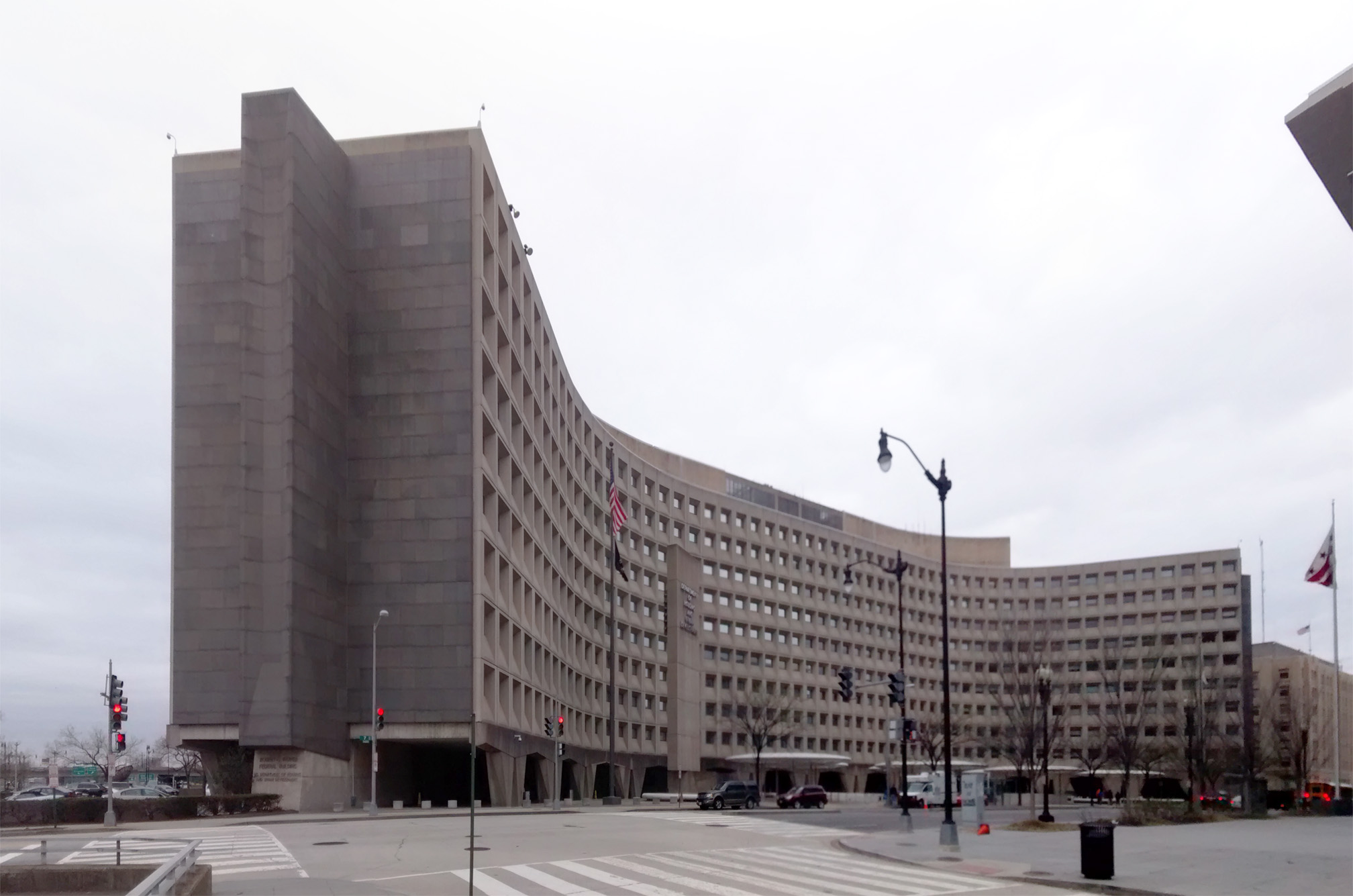
Robert C. Weaver Federal Building, the headquarters of the U.S. Department of Housing and Urban Development

Breuer designed the Washington, D.C., headquarters building for the U.S. Department of Housing and Urban Development, which was completed in 1968. While the building received some initial praise, in recent decades it has received widespread criticism. Former Secretary of Housing and Urban Development Jack Kemp once described the building as "10 floors of basement." Another former Secretary, Shaun Donovan, has noted that "the building itself is among the most reviled in all of Washington—and with good reason." Many critics have argued that Breuer's design is unoriginal, and essentially mimics the UNESCO Headquarters and IBM Research Center which he designed several years earlier.

Throughout the almost 30 years and nearly 100 buildings that followed, Breuer worked with a number of partners and associates with whom he openly and insistently shared design credit: Pier Luigi Nervi at UNESCO; Herbert Beckhard, Robert Gatje, Hamilton Smith and Tician Papachristou in New York, Mario Jossa and Harry Seidler in Paris. Their contribution to his life’s work has largely been credited properly, though the critics and public rightly recognized a "Breuer Building" when they saw one.

=== Architectural phases ===
Breuer's architectural vocabulary moved through at least four recognizable phases:

1. The white box and glass school of the International style that he adapted for his early houses in Europe and the USA: the Harnischmacher House, Gropius House, Frank House, and his own first house in Lincoln, Massachusetts.
2. The punctured wooden walls that characterized his famous 1948 "House in the Garden" for MoMA and a series of relatively modest houses for knowledgeable university faculty families in the 50s. This included the first of his houses in New Canaan, Connecticut, with its balcony hung off a cantilever.
3. The modular prefabricated concrete panel façades that first enclosed his favorite IBM Laboratory in La Gaude, near Nice, France, and went on to be used in many of his institutional buildings plus the whole town at Flaine. Some critics spoke of repetitiveness but Breuer quoted a professional friend: "I can't design a whole new system every Monday morning."
4. The stone and shaped concrete that he used for unique and memorable commissions: his best-known project, the Met Breuer (formerly the Whitney Museum of American Art), the St. Francis de Sales and St. John's Abbey churches, the Atlanta Central Library, and his second house in New Canaan.

== In popular culture ==
Breuer was a partial inspiration for the character of László Tóth in Brady Corbet's film The Brutalist. Several of Tóth's furniture designs in the film are highly reminiscent of Breuer's work, including the Cesca Chair and Long Chair.
