= Naum Slutzky =

Ukrainian industrial designer

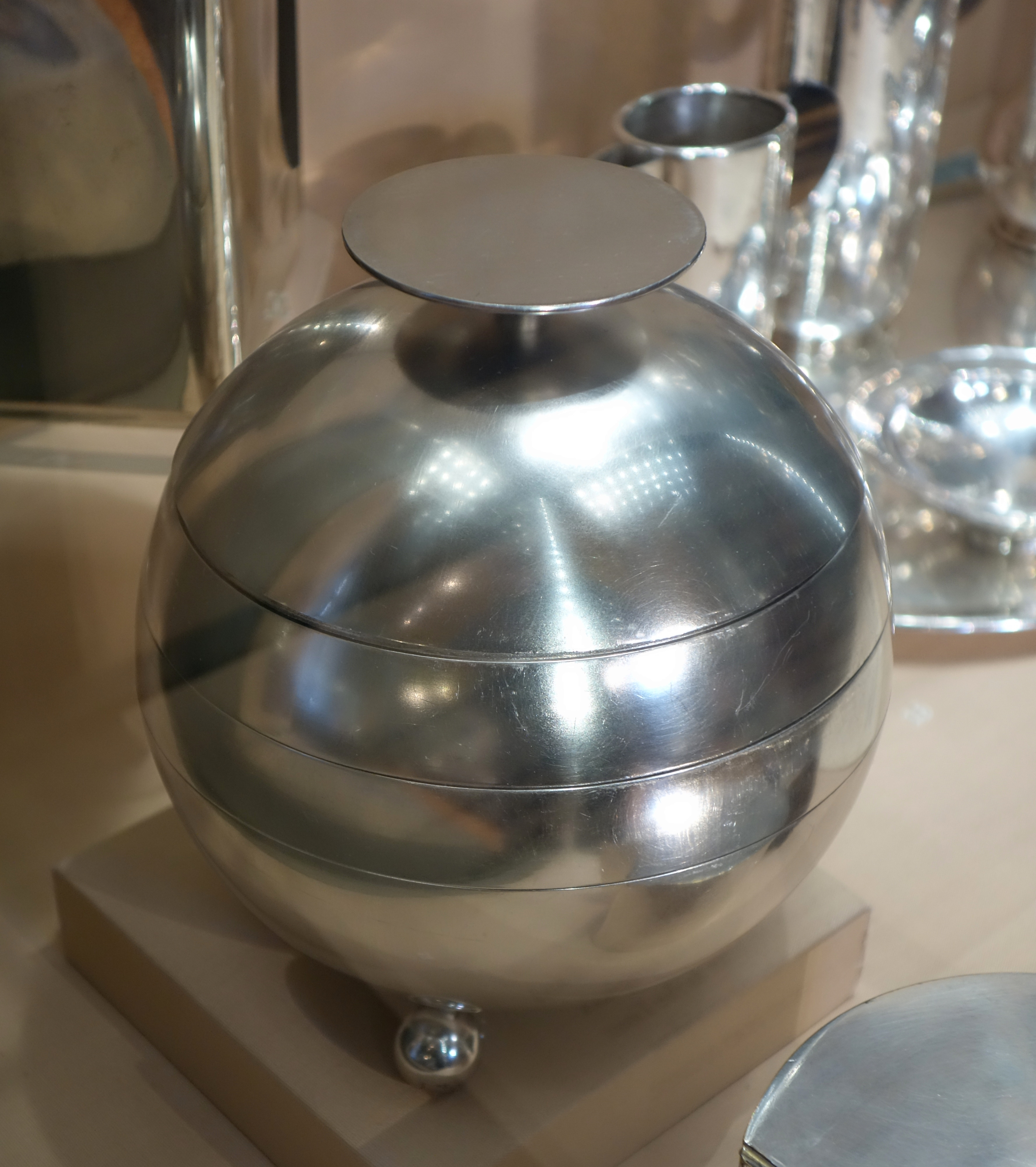
Biscuit barrel designed and made by Naum Slutzky, about 1934

Naum Slutzky (28 February 1894 in Kiev, Russian Empire (now Kyiv, Ukraine) – 4 November 1965 in Stevenage, England) was a goldsmith, industrial designer and master craftsman of the Bauhaus. In the art history literature his first name is sometimes spelled as Nahum or Nawn.

== Bauhaus ==
Slutzky studied to become a goldsmith at Wiener Werkstätte (for Josef Hoffmann and Edward Wimmer among others) in Vienna. From 1919 he taught at the Bauhaus in Weimar, working with Johannes Itten. He mainly designed jewellery and lamps, but also teapots and coffee pots (there is a silver teapot in the collections of Victoria and Albert Museum London, and a coffee pot in Nationalmuseum/National Museum of Fine Arts, Stockholm). In 1924 he left Bauhaus to become an independent designer.

== England ==
In 1933, when the Bauhaus school was closed by the Nazis, Slutzky fled to England where he initially found work at the progressive art college, Dartington Hall in Totness, Devon. He went on to be a design teacher at Central School of Arts and Crafts and the Royal College of Art in London. While in Birmingham, he worked at The College of Arts and Crafts and collaborated with local firm Best & Lloyd At the end of his life, Slutzky taught Three-Dimensional Design at Ravensbourne College of Art and Design, Bromley, Kent 1963-1965.

== Exhibitions ==
=== 1928 to 1965 ===
- 1928 Hamburger Sezession, 8. Sezessionsausstellung
- 1930 Hamburger Neue Sezession, Kunsthalle Hamburg
- 1930 Deutscher Werkbund im Grand Palais, Paris
- 1931 Hamburger Sezession, 10. Sezessionsausstellung
- 1961 Goldsmith's Hall, London
- 1961 Museum für Kunst und Gewerbe Hamburg: Schmuck aus Hamburger Zeit

=== From 1965 ===
- 1966 Musée des Artes Décoratives, Paris (Frankreich)
- 1968 Württembergischer Kunstverein, Stuttgart: 50 Jahre Bauhaus
- 1983 Kunsthalle Hamburg: Schmuck von Naum Slutzky
- 1986 Neue Gesellschaft für bildende Kunst, Berlin: Kunst im Exil
- 1995 Museum für Kunst und Gewerbe Hamburg: Naum Slutzky - Ein Bauhauskünstler

== Works in museums ==
- Bauhaus-Archiv, Berlin
- Museum für Kunst und Gewerbe Hamburg
- British Museum, London
- Victoria and Albert Museum, London
- Goldsmith's Hall, London
- Nationalmuseum, Stockholm
