= Jacqueline Groag =

British-Czech textile designer (1903–1986)

- Born: Hilde Pick; 6 April 1903; Prague, Bohemia (now Czech Republic)
- Died: 13 January 1986 (aged 82); London, England
- Occupation: Textile designer

Jacqueline Groag (née Hilde Pick; 6 April 1903 – 13 January 1986) was an influential textile designer in Great Britain in the period following World War II. She produced and designed fabrics for leading Parisian fashion houses including Chanel, Lanvin, House of Worth, Schiaparelli and Paul Poiret.

She later became a Royal Designer for Industry (RDI), the ultimate accolade for any designer in Britain.

== Early life ==
She was born Hilde Pick to Jewish parents on 6 April 1903. She later changed her name to Jacqueline Groag when she married modernist architect Jacques Groag in 1937.

As a child, she had been in poor health and, unlike her siblings, had been educated at home. She learned all the subjects of the education curriculum, but with no formal exams, something that left her (in her own words) a "sophisticated naïve". During the 1920s, Groag studied textile design in Vienna and thrived under the schooling of professor Franz Cižek, who was delighted by her lack of previous formal art education.

Franz Cižek also recommended her to Josef Hoffmann, head of the Wiener Werkstätte, where she became one of his students in the design school of the Kunstgewerbeschule. As a student, she won first prize in a competition organised by the Kunstgewerbeschule.

=== Vienna ===
In 1930, Groag was mentioned in an article by Dr. Hans von Ankwicz for the German publication Deutsche Kunst und Dekoration on her work. Ankwicz described her as a "front-runner of the Hoffmann school" who "currently dominated the design of textiles, particularly prints".

=== Second World War ===
In 1938, Jacqueline and Jacques fled to Prague, Czechoslovakia due to the Nazi unification of Austria and Germany, the Anschluss. Their stay in Prague did not last long, as they were forced to flee for London the following year, following the Nazi invasion of Czechoslovakia. When they arrived in London, they were greeted by the leading members of the British Design Factory, including Sir Gordon Russell, Sir Charles Reilly and Jack Pritchard.

== Career ==
During the 1930s, Groag travelled to cities such as Paris and New York to enhance her international reputation. She was awarded a gold medal for textile design at the Milano Triennale in 1933 and another gold medal for printed textiles at the Paris Exposition in 1937.

=== Post-war ===
In 1945, she received the accolade of one of her dress fabrics being chosen by the couturier Edward Molyneux for a collection of dresses for Queen Elizabeth II. Jacqueline and her husband gained British citizenship in 1947. They became members of the Society of Industrial Artists.

In 1951, the Festival of Britain took place, and most of the contemporary styles of textiles and wallpapers where heavily influenced by her work from the 1940s. From that point she became a major influence on pattern design internationally, with clients like the Associated American Artists, Hallmark Cards and John Lewis.

Throughout the 1950s and 1960s, she became more and more involved with Sir Misha Black and the Design Research Unit (DRU), working on the interiors of boats, aircraft and trains. She especially worked on the design of textiles and plastics for British Overseas Airways Corporation and British Rail. She also got a commission from Misha Black in the 1970s to make a moquette for London Transport, used for seating on buses and tube trains.

== Personal life and death ==
Jacqueline first met Jacques Groag in the 1930s at a Viennese masked ball; they got engaged in 1931, but did not marry until 1937. He suffered a heart attack on a London bus whilst on his way to the opera, and died on 28 January 1962, aged 69.

Jacqueline Groag died on 13 January 1986, aged 82.
