= Jacques Groag =

British-Austrian architect and interior designer

- Born: 5 February 1892; Olomouc, Austria-Hungary
- Died: 28 January 1962 (aged 69); London, Great Britain
- Occupation: Architect

Jacques Groag (5 February 1892 – 28 January 1962) was an architect and an interior designer, originally from Moravia.

== Early life and education ==
Jacques Groag was born in 1892 in Olomouc to a well known Jewish family who lived in a malt house: his notable relatives included his brother Emanuel "Emo" Groag, who was a draftsman and a cartoonist, cousin Heinrich Groag, an acclaimed lawyer who also worked on the domestic and international scene as a pacifist, and nephew Willi Groag, who was known for his humanitarian work during World War II.

Groag studied at the German grammar school in Olomouc, and later graduated from German secondary school in Manchester. After completing military service, he went to Vienna to study architecture in 1910 with Adolf Loos, a well-known Austrian architect of Moravian origin. Ludwig Wittgenstein was sent for his military training in Olomouc and Paul Engelmann, native from the town, introduced him to the Groags. When Margaret Wittgenstein decided to build a home in Vienna, Engelmann was contacted and he brought along in the project Jacques Groag. However as Ludwig Wittgenstein became deeply involved in the work Jacques pulled out.

=== Second World War ===
Jacques and Jacqueline Groag fled to Prague in 1938; after the Anschluss of Austria, they could not stay long in Prague. Forced to leave, they decided to move to London. Despite all the language difficulties, they mainly focused on their designs, later working for British design factories, including Gordon Russell's.

== Career ==
Jacques Groag began to devote a separate creation in the mid-1920s: he slowly started working independently, and at the same time began collaborating with Viennese architectural offices.

He was trained as an architect in Vienna and later on joined Adolf Loos office; he set up his own practice in 1926, and in no time became one of the leading architects in Vienna for working on housing projects, public buildings and private houses. In 1939, after coming to the UK, he joined Gordon Russell's team designing utility furniture.

Jacques and Jacqueline Groag's estate is housed at the Victoria and Albert Museum in London.

=== Post-war ===
Jacques produced designs for exhibitions including Britain Can Make It in 1946 and the Festival of Britain in 1951. In 1952, he became a Fellow of the Society of Industrial Artists. He also worked on interior schemes and furniture designs.

== Personal life and death ==
Jacques Groag married textile designer Hilde Pick in 1937, who later changed her name to Jacqueline Groag. Jacques and Jacqueline first met in the 1930s at a Viennese masked ball; they got engaged in 1931, but did not marry until 1937. Jacques was unable to devote himself to architecture until the end of his life, and he experienced depression. He suffered a heart attack on a London bus whilst on his way to the opera, and died on 28 January 1962, aged 69.
