= Marcel Breuer House II =

House in New Canaan, Connecticut

- U.S. National Register of Historic Places
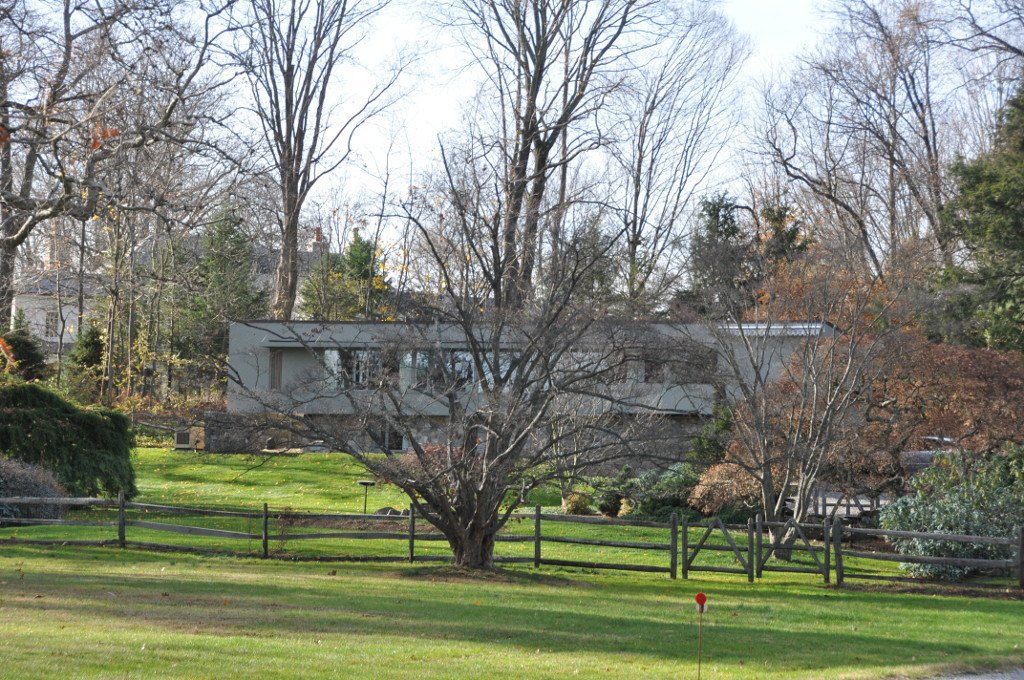

- Location within Connecticut Location within the United States
- Interactive map of Marcel Breuer House II
- Location: 122 Sunset Hill Road, New Canaan, Connecticut
- Coordinates: 41°09′21″N 73°30′29″W
- Area: 2.8 acres (1.1 ha)
- Built: 1947
- Architect: Breuer, Marcel; et al.
- Architectural style: Modern Movement
- MPS: Mid-Twentieth-Century Modern Residences in Connecticut 1930–1979, MPS
- NRHP reference No.: 10000572
- Added to NRHP: September 16, 2010

The Marcel Breuer House II (labeled Breuer House, New Canaan I in his official papers; also known as the Breuer–Robeck House) is a two-story modernist house at 122 Sunset Hill Road in New Canaan, Connecticut, United States. Built in 1947, it was designed by architect Marcel Breuer as a home for his family. The cantilevered design, featuring glazing, wood, and stone finishes, helped bring attention to Breuer's fledgling architectural practice in New York City. The house was generally praised when it was completed, and it is listed on the National Register of Historic Places.

The Breuer family occupied the house for just four years, after which it was sold to opera singer Russell Roberts, who rented the property out. The Robeck family bought the house in 1964 and made several modifications over the next three decades, including a garage and a swimming pool. The Robecks also hired Breuer associate Herbert Beckhard to design a rear annex between 1985 and 1988. The house was sold in 1994 to John P. Horgan, who obtained a preservation easement on the property. It was resold to a limited liability company, 122 Sunset LLC, in 2022.

The house sits on a hillside within a 3-acre (1.2 ha) estate, overlooking a meadow. The original house measures 74 by 20 feet (22.6 by 6.1 m), while the annex measures 54 by 20 feet (16.5 by 6.1 m). The lower level is recessed from the upper level, which, as built, was cantilevered from a set of cables at the roofline. The main living areas are placed on the upper level, with a central kitchen and dining area flanked by bedrooms to the south and a living room to the north. The lower or basement level contains secondary spaces such as a child's bedroom, workshop, and playroom. There are additional rooms in the annex.

== Site ==
The Marcel Breuer House II is located at 122 Sunset Hill Road in New Canaan, Connecticut. The site spans about 3 acres (1.2 ha). (Note: Masello 1993, p. 23, cites a slightly different figure of 2.7 acres (1.1 ha). Hyman 2001, p. 348, gives a significantly differing value of 7 acres (2.8 ha).) The house itself is separated from the street by a long, sloping meadow surrounded by trees, being located about 200 feet (61 m) west of the street and resting on a slope. Along the site's northern boundary, a tree-lined gravel driveway leads from Sunset Road, separating the house from its garage. The end of the driveway, a vehicular loop, overlooks the northeastern corner of the house, allowing visitors to see the eastern elevation more clearly. Other landscape features include a fence west of the lawn, a preexisting sycamore tree overlooking the eastern facade, and a Japanese maple at the end of the driveway. The grounds include more Japanese maples and some hemlocks.

The site has two outbuildings. Across the driveway north of the house is a wooden garage built in 1969, with a facade divided vertically into three bays that face the driveway. The garage has a concrete foundation slab, a gray wooden facade with a roll-down gate and horizontal windows, and a sloped wooden roof. East of the house is a swimming pool dating from 1971, which is built into the ground. Nearby sites include the Isaac Davis and Marion Dalton Hall House (25 Lambert Road) and Hanford Davenport House (353 Oenoke Ridge) to the northeast, as well as the New Canaan Nature Center and the Hampton Inn Building (179 Oenoke Ridge) to the east.

== History ==
The Hungarian-American architect Marcel Breuer (known as Lajkó, the diminutive of his middle name Lajos) emigrated from Hungary to the United States in 1937. He built four houses for his family in the U.S., all of them in New England; his first and third houses were in Massachusetts, while his second and fourth houses were in Connecticut. His first home in Lincoln, Massachusetts, was built in 1937 near the Gropius House, the residence of Breuer's Bauhaus colleague Walter Gropius. In 1940, Breuer married Constance "Connie" Crocker Leighton, a secretary at Breuer and Gropius's practice; they had two children. Their first child, Tamas, was born before the Breuer House II was built in 1947, while his sister Francesca was not born until after they had moved out.

=== Development ===
After practicing architecture in Massachusetts for nine years, Breuer relocated his office to New York City in 1946. Following several mishaps in which Tamas got lost in a Macy's store and pulled a fire alarm in the Metropolitan Museum of Art, Breuer decided to build a house in the town of New Canaan, Connecticut, in the city's northeastern suburbs. Land was cheaper in New Canaan than in the city itself, and Breuer may have been more attracted to a suburban lifestyle—a factor in the development of his Lincoln residence, located on the outskirts of Boston. Eliot Noyes, a protege of Breuer's, had also recently built a house in the town, which was a major factor in the Breuer family's decision to move to that particular suburb. Connie reflected that, after a year of living in the city with their young son, "it was not difficult to conclude that what we desired most profoundly was space—all kinds of space, both indoors and out". In addition, Lajkó preferred to design smaller residences, even though his work at the time mainly consisted of larger corporate structures.

The specific site of the Breuer House II had previously been part of the 170-acre (69 ha) Platt farm, which was resold several times in the 18th century before becoming part of the Child estate in 1893. The Breuer family obtained the site in May 1947; Connie wrote that Lajkó had selected the site because of its landscape, which consisted of a hillside between a meadow and a forest. The Breuer House II, the family's first residence in New Canaan, was designed to fit partially into the hillside at ground level. The main story, the upper level, was laid out with bedrooms separated from communal family areas. Because Lajkó was designing the house solely for himself and his family, he took the opportunity to experiment with the design. Inspired by Frank Lloyd Wright's Usonian homes, he decided to experiment with cantilevered construction. The compact nature of the house was also influenced to some extent by the Breuers' limited budget.

A local contractor, Irving Wood, built the Breuer House II during mid-1947. That August, Lajkó left for South America, where he was attempting to pursue commissions. Noyes and another member of Breuer's team, Harry Seidler, oversaw the completion of the house. Just as Connie was about to move in, Noyes and Seidler noticed that the cantilevers were sagging; Lajkó had misjudged the forces on the cables, necessitating their replacement. One of Lajkó's friends, the Brooklyn architect Nick Farkas, provided recommendations for fixing the cantilevers. In response to a letter from Breuer that September, expressing concerns about the cables, Noyes wrote that the design "looks very exciting". Noyes was so confident in the revised design that he had removed the temporary supports that held up the porches.

=== Breuer use ===
When the building was finished in October 1947, temporary supports had to be reinstalled under the porches after they started sagging again; the house had cost $17,300 in total (equivalent to $249,400 in 2025). After the house's construction, other modernist architects also designed their houses there; Philip Johnson, the director of the Museum of Modern Art's architecture department, said he decided to move there specifically because of Breuer and Noyes. Breuer became part of the Harvard Five group of architects who lived in the town, along with Noyes, Johnson, John M. Johansen, and Landis Gores. The unusual design was profiled in architectural publications. In addition, it was featured as a stop on New Canaan's first tour of modern houses in 1949, which attracted 1,100 observers who paid a fee to see the houses. Though architecture students often dropped by the house uninvited, the Breuers were happy to accommodate them.

When Lajkó was designing the Stillman House in 1950, he invited Rufus and Leslie Stillman over to discuss the design; Rufus reportedly said "That's the house I want built for us" when he first saw the Breuer House II. The architect I. M. Pei, a good friend of Lajkó's, said that the house often hosted parties, to which Breuer's European friends were invited. Meanwhile, the sagging of the cantilevers worsened rapidly. Pei recalled that the building was "a delightful house, but always bouncy", while the sculptor Alexander Calder had to be reminded by his wife, "Don't conga on the cantilever!" Breuer installed a retaining wall under the cantilevered section in 1951. Issues with leaking roofs and cracked walls had arisen during the 1940s not long after the house was completed, and continued into the next decade.

=== Later use ===
In 1951, the Breuers moved into their second New Canaan house, the Breuer House IV. The new house was a brick and fieldstone structure built into the landscape, and, because of the structural issues with the Breuer House II, lacked overhanging sections. The Breuer House II's second owner, the opera singer Russell Roberts, acquired it that April for $40,000 (equivalent to $496,200 in 2025). Roberts rented out the house for a decade, and during this time, round columns and posts were placed underneath the house to support it. Peter and Gertrude Robeck, a family from California who were looking to renovate a house of their own, rented the house starting in 1962 after hearing about it in a brochure. Initially, the Robeck family was skeptical about the house's modern architecture. Peter Robeck recalled realizing that the family "were madly in love with this place" after looking at a hemlock tree on the site. Roberts began looking to sell the house by 1963, and the house was sold in September 1964 to the Robeck family, who paid $54,000 (equivalent to $560,600 in 2025).

The Robeck family ultimately owned the house for three decades. During this time, they made several changes to the site; for example, in the 1960s, the Robeck family paid $70,000 for several mature trees that they then planted around the site. The family also added the garage in 1969 and the swimming pool two years later. Over the years, the Robeck family sought to expand the house, finding the layout unintuitive and the rooms cramped. Herbert Beckhard, one of Breuer's proteges, was hired to construct the rear annex between 1985 and 1988. The addition was largely set back from the original house and cannot be seen from nearby. As part of the expansion, Beckhard enlarged or added some rooms, removed some walls, and relocated an interior stair. In addition, a fieldstone cladding and larger windows were added to the lower level facade, and Beckhard may have replaced the brises-soleil shading the upper-story windows. The annex originally had perforations surrounding an apple tree; the perforations were infilled when the tree was cut down in the 1990s.

In 1994, John P. Horgan bought the house from the Robeck family. (Note: A National Park Service report gives a date of 1993.) Horgan, a venture capital investor, paid $1.1 million for what he later described as "my little gray shack". The Marcel Breuer House II was listed on the National Register of Historic Places in 2010. The next year, amid the then-recent demolitions of several modernist houses in New Canaan, Horgan obtained a preservation easement for the house. The easement, which was given to preservation group Historic New England, legally prohibited any current or future owners of the Breuer–Robeck House from demolishing it. The house was sold in 2022 to a limited liability company, 122 Sunset LLC. The company, which paid $2.75 million for the house, made the purchase on behalf of Brian and Sharon Libman.

== Architecture ==
The design of the house was influenced by the Bauhaus principles that had guided Marcel Breuer's early career. It is an early example of Breuer's "long house" or "long box" designs, a style he later refined with the construction of the Breuer House III in Cape Cod, Massachusetts. In designing the Breuer House II, Breuer experimented extensively with balloon framing, cantilevering the upper story outward from a set of cables. The design comports with the characteristics of Breuer's favorite style of residence, a double-height "hillside house" that could be accessed on both levels. Breuer also believed that the kitchen should be centrally located and adjacent to the laundry room, and that the children's bedrooms and playroom should also adjoin each other; these beliefs were reflected in the house's layout.

The structure is alternatively known as the Breuer–Robeck House or as the New Canaan Breuer House I to distinguish it from the family's fourth house; (Note: The "Breuer House II" name is sometimes used to refer to the fourth house (also known as the New Canaan House II, or the Breuer–Bratti House).) it is labeled Breuer House, New Canaan I, in Breuer's official papers. House Beautiful wrote in 1998 that the cantilevered structure was an example of Breuer's "purist" interpretation of Bauhaus teachings for an American setting.

=== Exterior ===
The Breuer House II is a wooden structure with steel suspension cables supporting the cantilevered upper story. The upper story protrudes on all sides from the lower story, which is embedded into the hill to its west. The main section of the house dates to 1947 and measures 74 by 20 feet (22.6 by 6.1 m) across; its lower story has a footprint of 16 by 54 feet (4.9 by 16.5 m). A one-story rear addition to the west, constructed from 1985 to 1988, was designed by Breuer protegé Herbert Beckhard and measures 54 by 20 feet (16.5 by 6.1 m) across. Over the years, the cantilevered section has been shored up with additional walls to deal with sagging, blunting the cantilevers' effect. Architectural Record wrote that Breuer had managed to cantilever the house's upper stories without using concrete, steel, or another heavy-duty material. The cantilevers themselves resembled Breuer's earlier design for an Isokon cantilevered chair.

==== Upper level ====
The upper story is approximately 4 feet (1.2 m) above the terrain at the west end of the original house. It is cantilevered 10 feet (3.0 m) beyond the lower level at the shorter northern and southern elevations (Note: McCarter 2024, p. 110, gives a different figure of 9.5 feet (2.9 m) for the northern and southern cantilevers.) and 2 feet (0.61 m) on the longer western and eastern elevations. The western and eastern cantilevers rest on west–east floor joists spanning the upper story's entire width, which are sufficient to carry the weight of these cantilevers. The northern and southern cantilevers rest on north–south joists that protrude from the concrete block walls; the cables were intended to allow these cantilevers to be self-supporting. The steel cables are bolted to both the cantilevered sections and to the roofline and were purchased from a local hardware store for $22 (equivalent to $317 in 2025). An outdoor porch juts out from the northern cantilever, giving the upper level the approximate shape of a letter "J". The porch measures 12 by 22 feet (3.7 by 6.7 m), with a wooden parapet. Between the spring and autumn, the Breuer family often ate meals on the porch.

The upper story's facade is covered in cypress siding. While most of the wood is laid vertically, diagonal boards are used on the western and eastern elevations of the north and south cantilevers; the diagonal sheathing carried the majority of the cantilevered section's structural loads. The facade has extensive glazing. There is a band of windows stretching about 40 feet (12 m) along the eastern elevation, flanked by smaller windows at either end. The author James Crump wrote that the large windows were intended to "emphasize the relationship between the house's interior and exterior". The eastern windows are shielded by wood-slatted trellises or brises soleil (sun shades), which are suspended from horizontal steel cables; an awning above a portion of the porch replaces part of the brise soleil there. The northern elevation has a single large living-room window, while the southern elevation has a cantilevered porch overlooked by smaller vertical windows. The central portion of the western elevation had small casement windows, while the southern end of that elevation had a vertical opening. Just below the roofline, a copper flashing covers a layer of wooden boards at the cornice. The cornice functions as a truss, carrying the cables at both ends of the house, and is composed of a double layer of 2-by-6-foot (0.61 m × 1.83 m) wooden boards.

The western annex uses similar materials to the original house and is recessed from the main house on both the northern and southern elevations, with a stone patio and entrance on the north. The annex's northern entrance consists of a glass door under a cantilevered awning, with windows on one side. This doorway replaces the original main entrance, which was on the western elevation of the original building. The annex's western elevation has a recessed porch at its center and an exposed basement, while the southern elevation has horizontal windows. The building has an inverse-pitched butterfly roof, which has a V-shaped cross-section with a crease down the middle.

==== Lower level ====
From bottom to top, the foundation is made of a 6-inch (150 mm) layer of crushed stone fill, a 4-inch (100 mm) layer of concrete, and a 1-inch (25 mm) layer of granite. The walls surrounding the foundation are placed on footings made of 12-inch (300 mm) concrete blocks. On the lower level is a small movable casement window with larger windows on either side. The exterior walls are made of concrete, which was originally painted white; the walls support the concrete floor slab of the upper story. Fieldstone cladding was added to the lower-level walls in the 1980s, and there are short walls extending from the lower-story facade, supporting the cantilevers.

A wall, and a stone staircase traversing a terrace garden, extend perpendicularly from the house's northern elevation. The lower and upper levels are connected by a blue-toned, steel-framed stair descending from the upper-level porch. The treads are suspended from rods hung from the upper level. (Note: Sources disagree on whether the treads are made of bluestone, wood, or concrete.) The risers between the treads are empty, giving the impression that the stair is floating; this was a common design feature in Breuer's buildings. There is a blue-painted steel gate at the top landing, and a concrete block helps stabilize the top of the stair.

=== Interior ===
The building originally spanned 2,400 square feet (220 m^{2}) but, with Beckhard's 1980s addition, was increased to 4,200 square feet (390 m^{2}). The main living areas are placed on the upper level, with the bedrooms to the south, the family rooms to the north, and a kitchen and dining area in between. The layout was intended to capture as much sunlight as possible during the winter (when the sun was low and to the south), while also taking advantage of morning light. The lower or basement level contains secondary spaces such as children's rooms, and it is correspondingly smaller. The arrangement of the interior spaces was intended to segregate the house's private rooms from its communal or social rooms, while also integrating the rooms with each other and the outdoors. According to Herbert Beckhard, the design showed how Breuer was "very sensitive to human needs—the way families interact with each other", even as Breuer focused on the house's "visual flow". Peter Robeck compared his time there to living in a treehouse, citing the expansive views from the upper story.

In general, the spaces are painted white. Vermilion, cadmium yellow, or cobalt blue hues were used for some features such as doors, while the walls were painted cobalt blue, brown, or shades of gray. Originally, the floors were made of asphalt or bluestone tiles, some of which were covered by Haitian mats. The plywood walls are covered with drywall cladding. The cypress-board ceilings are slightly sloped and contain embedded recessed lighting. Breuer designed some of the furniture, including all the furniture in the dining room, the living room chairs, and a living-room coffee table with a radio enclosed inside. While some of the chairs, tables, and beds were movable, most of the furniture was built-in. The house was equipped with an oil-fired boiler and a central plumbing core when it was built.

==== Original house ====
At the north end of the house is a living room that measures 20 by 20 feet (6.1 by 6.1 m) across. The room's north wall was originally painted cobalt blue for emphasis, and the room also has large windows at its perimeter. The living room's wooden ceiling is stylistically similar to the brises-soleil outside, and its floor extends onto the outdoor porch, with bluestone tiling marking the location of a former entrance. Separating the living room from the dining room is a brick fireplace and shaft, which were originally painted white and contain sculpted niches. The top of the fireplace shaft has angled brick capital. A stone band on the floor further delineates the boundary between the living and dining rooms.

At the center of the main floor, a full-height wall separates the dining room to the north and the kitchen to the south. No doors separate the kitchen from other rooms, allowing visitors to more easily enter and exit the kitchen. Connie wrote that the house's secluded location had made doors unnecessary. The kitchen has unpainted walls, a sink with a tiled backsplash, cabinets, and a linoleum floor. A sliding door with shelves separates the dining room and kitchen, and a pass-through (infilled in the 1990s) connected the two rooms directly. The kitchen's placement allowed occupants to supervise the rest of the house more easily. The laundry room was originally adjacent to the kitchen. The original laundry room and a bathroom were destroyed in the 1980s when the kitchen was expanded. Along the upper level's western elevation, a hallway leads south from the foyer, with closets for the bedrooms. The hallway originally had windows facing west; when these were removed to make way for the annex, two skylights were installed in the ceiling.

There are two bedrooms at the rear, which have gum plywood ceilings. Breuer did not assign the bedrooms to particular members of the family, although in practice, he and his wife ended up sleeping upstairs. The upstairs bedrooms double as private study rooms with desks. The main bedroom, measuring 12 by 20 feet (3.7 by 6.1 m), has a piano as well. On the lower story, the south end has a workshop, which is illuminated by a large window on the southern elevation. There is a central hall on the eastern side of the lower level, measuring 26 feet (7.9 m) wide and lit by a pair of narrow windows; this hall is sometimes described as a playroom. The playroom's presence allowed the Breuer family to entertain visitors without being distracted by noise and without having to deal with mud or debris. To the north is the child's bedroom, which contains a pair of cantilevered daybeds illuminated by recessed lights. The lower story also has a bathtub, heating/drying room, and refrigeration room, which, along with the storage rooms, are placed on the windowless western end of that story.

==== Annex ====
The main entrance leads to the intermediate landing of a bluestone staircase connecting the lower and upper levels. The staircase ascends to a foyer with horizontal cabinets, a closet door with vertical accents, and a cypress-board ceiling. The upper story of the western annex contains a dressing room, laundry room, and bath. The ceiling of the annex's upper story is also made of cypress boards and is illuminated by skylights. On the lower story, the annex has a second bedroom.

== Reception and media ==
When the house was completed, the Architectural Record wrote that "Breuer has done a house which undoubtedly will find its way into future texts on architecture". The magazine wrote that the design gave the impression of a one-story house balanced atop a small basement, and it extolled the layout as encouraging active living without the need for waitstaff. The Architectural Review wrote that "the general details of the house are extremely simple" and that, as a whole, the house's design was intended to minimize housekeeping duties. Harper's Bazaar said that "the house is so compactly planned that [the Breuers] have few housekeeping problems". Acclaim was not universal: A writer pseudonymously known as "Ogden Gnash-Teeth" complained to a local newspaper about the Breuer House II and the Harvard Five's other houses, which they contended were "as gracious as Sunoco service stations".

Retrospectively, The Baltimore Sun wrote in 1973 that the house had become "an architectural Mecca", alongside Philip Johnson's nearby Glass House. A 1976 poll of American architects ranked the Breuer House II and Philip Johnson's Glass House as two of the country's 150 best designs; the two houses were acclaimed for their "lasting impact on design and the quality of people's lives". James Crump, who wrote a book about Breuer's work in 2021, said that the house was "masterfully nestled" into the hillside. The historian Robert McCarter said that the house was "at once formally deceptively simple [...] and at the same time structurally dramatic", citing the contrasting rectangular massing and the cantilevers.

The house's design drew attention to Breuer's work as a whole. The historian Isabelle Hyman wrote in 2001 that the Breuer House II was the architect's most widely publicized residential design, describing it as "an icon of American postwar suburban modernism". Crump wrote that the Breuer House II, along with Breuer's 1950 House in the Museum Garden for the Museum of Modern Art, had brought attention to Breuer's still-fledgling New York architectural practice. When the house was completed, it was featured in architectural publications such as Architectural Record and The Architectural Review, and it was detailed in a 1951 book by the New Canaan Historical Society. Pedro E. Guerrero, a longtime photographer for Frank Lloyd Wright, took several images of the house in 1949, later expressing awe at the simplicity of the design. A scale model of the house was also featured in a 2001 exhibit at the Vitra Design Museum.

== See also ==
- National Register of Historic Places listings in Fairfield County, Connecticut
- Woods End Road Historic District, location of the Marcel Breuer House I
