= Shofuso Japanese House and Garden =

Garden in Philadelphia, Pennsylvania, US

Shofuso
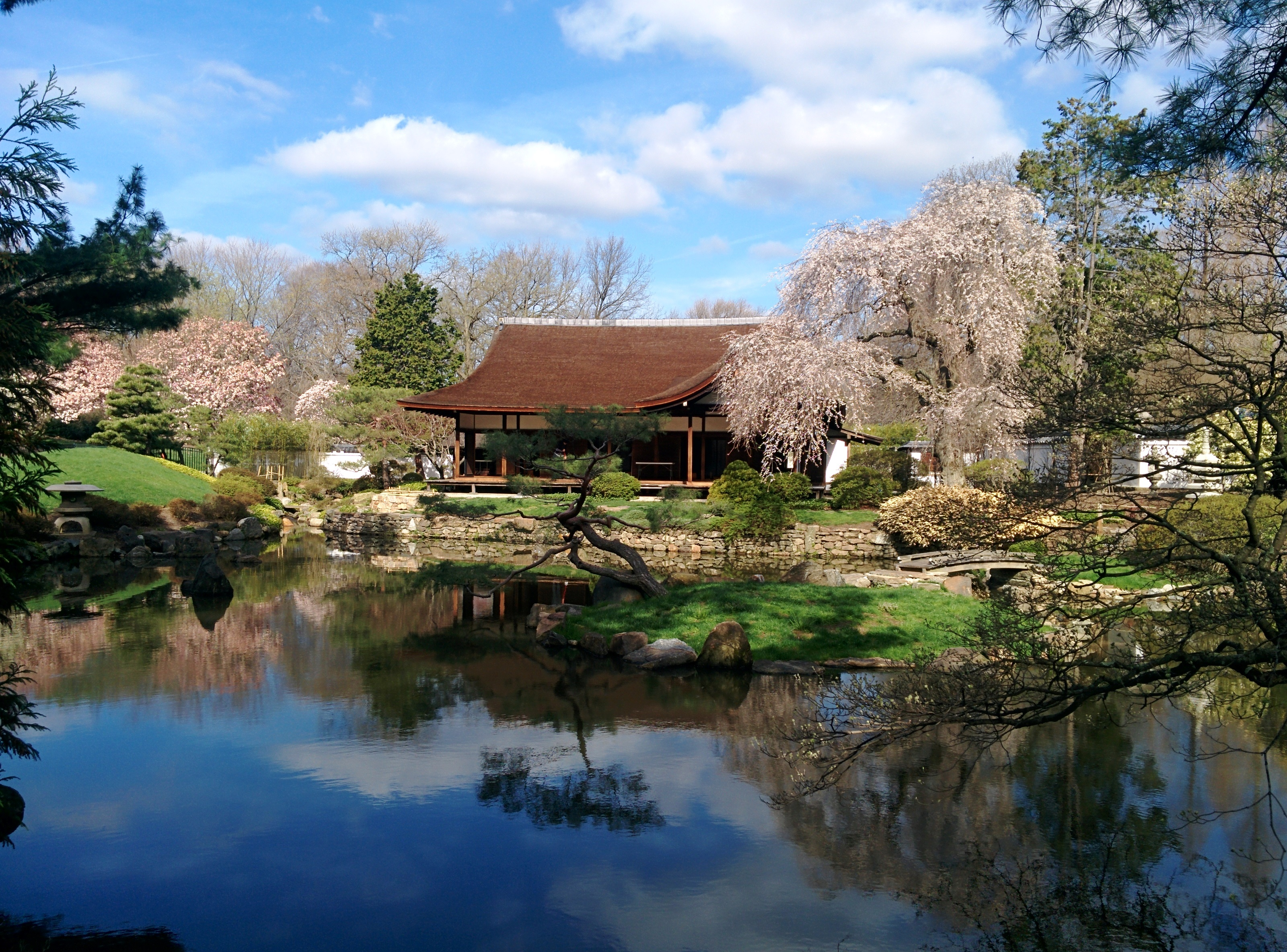
- Shofuso in April 2014
- Interactive map of the Shofuso area
- Alternative names: Shofuso

General information
- Architectural style: Shoin-Zukuri (17th Century)
- Location: Horticultural and Lansdowne Drs. West Fairmount Park, Philadelphia, United States
- Coordinates: 39.9814°N 75.213°W
- Opened: 1954
- Relocated: 1958
- Renovated: 1976

Design and construction
- Architect: Junzo Yoshimura
- Other designers: Heizaemon Ito, 11th (Master carpenter)

Shofuso (Japanese: 松風荘, lit. 'pine breeze villa'), also known as Japanese House and Garden, is a 17th century-style Japanese house and garden in Philadelphia, Pennsylvania, United States. It was originally exhibited at the Museum of Modern Art (MoMA) in New York in 1954, designed by the famed modernist Japanese architect Junzō Yoshimura. In 1958 it was relocated to Philadelphia's West Fairmount Park on the site of the Centennial Exposition of 1876. Shofuso is a nonprofit historic site with over 30,000 visitors each year and is open to the public for visitation and group tours.

Shofuso was built in 1953 as a gift from Japan to American citizens, to symbolize post-war peace and friendship between the two countries. The building was constructed using traditional Japanese techniques and materials imported from Japan, and was originally exhibited in the courtyard of MoMA. After two years, it was relocated to Philadelphia and reconstructed in 1958. In 1976, a major restoration was conducted by a cadre of Japanese artisans in preparation for the American Bicentennial celebration. In 2007, contemporary Nihonga artist Hiroshi Senju created and donated an interior installation of twenty waterfall murals.

Shofuso is owned by the government of Philadelphia and is administered, maintained, preserved, and operated by the Japan America Society of Greater Philadelphia, a private nonprofit.

== Background ==
MoMA initiated their series of "House in the Garden" exhibitions in the courtyard of the Museum in 1949 with the Breuer House. Architectural director Philip Johnson and curator Arthur Drexler recognized the correspondence between modernism in the Western house and traditional Japanese architecture and proposed to build a Japanese house as the third exhibit of the series.

John D. Rockefeller III, then-president of the Japan Society (New York), and MoMA curator Arthur Drexler visited Japan in February 1953 to meet with the business leaders of Japan and to request their support for the project. The Japan-America Society (JAS) agreed to sponsor the project, and declared that the Japanese House should be donated by Japan as a gift to American people in order to promote the cultural exchange. Sponsored by both the private sector and the government, the JAS raised a total of ¥18.5 million ($51,000 at the exchange rate of ¥360/$ in 1953) from 270 corporations and individuals. The National Forestry Agency of Japan granted special permission to harvest the wood, particularly "hinoki" cypress wood, which was in short supply.

A special Rockefeller Architectural Committee was formed and recommended a 17th-century shoin-zukuri house for the exhibit since that style most typically represents Japanese traditional architecture. The Committee unanimously chose Junzo Yoshimura to design the house. Yoshimura had worked for Czech-born American modernist architect, Antonin Raymond for nine years in Tokyo and spent in 1940 a year in Raymond's office in New Hope, Pennsylvania. Yoshimura was close friends with George Nakashima, a Japanese American furniture maker in Bucks County, Pennsylvania. The 11th generation master carpenter, Heizaemon Ito was chosen to oversee the construction. Ito's family has been master carpenter of Lord Tokugawa, the shogunate family that ruled Japan throughout the Edo period (1600-1868), since the 17th century.

== Exhibit at MoMA ==
Pre-assembly of the house began in January 1953 at Ito's workshop in Nagoya, and was completed a year later, using the traditional Japanese method of building, which minimizes the use of structural nails, employing various joineries through the use of hand tools. The house was then disassembled and shipped to New York. The reassembly team led by architect Yoshimura arrived at New York in March 1954 and completed the construction mid-June with help of a cadre of Hawaiian Nisei carpenters. The inaugural ceremony was held on June 17, 1954, and Shofuso was opened to the public on June 19. Japanese prime minister Shigeru Yoshida visited Shofuso in November 1954, escorted by John D. and Blanchette Rockefeller. The American public was impressed with the beauty of natural wood, simple interior design, and the house's flexible plan. The exhibit was closed on October 16, 1955, after attracting almost a quarter of million visitors in two seasons, approximately three times as many visitors as the two previous MoMA House and Garden exhibits (the 1949 House in the Museum Garden by architect Marcel Breuer that exists today at Kykuit, the Rockefeller family estate in Pocantico Hills, New York, and a 1950 house by architect Gregory Ain), demolished after the exhibition.

== Nio-Mon Temple Gate ==
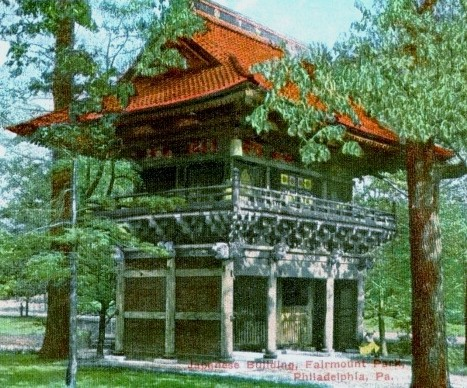
Nio-Mon Temple Gate

Nio-Mon Temple Gate was a c. 1600 Japanese building from Hitachi Province first exhibited at the 1904 World's Fair in St. Louis, Missouri. Following the fair, it was purchased and relocated to Fairmount Park. Also known as the "Japanese Pagoda", the area surrounding it was landscaped with a Japanese garden and lotus pond in 1909, funded by John T. Morris. A fire completely destroyed the Temple Gate on the evening of May 6, 1955, and thereby, as fate would have it, creating an ideal site for Shofuso.

== Relocation to Philadelphia ==
MoMA received a number of inquiries on the possibility of permanent exhibition of Shofuso. The final decision was to offer Shofuso as a gift to the Fairmount Park Commission in Philadelphia, a decision likely inspired by the presence of the Japanese garden in the park. In 1958, the carpenter, Okumura, and the gardener, Sano, who had built Shofuso at MoMA, returned from Japan to reconstruct Shofuso on the new site. The present setting of Shofuso was opened to the public on October 19, 1958.

Over the years, Shofuso fell into disrepair due to lack of maintenance. In 1975, Philadelphia Mayor Frank Rizzo contacted the Consulate General of Japan in New York to inquire about the possibility restoring Shofuso for the 1976 Bicentennial Celebration. The Japan-America Society raised ¥55 million ($180 thousand at the exchange rate of ¥308/$) to fund a complete major restoration of the house and garden in June 1976. In order to continue preservation and maintenance of Shofuso, a non-profit organization, the Friends of the Japanese House & Garden was incorporated in February 1982. The nonprofit administered Shofuso from 1982 to 2016, when it merged with the Japan America Society of Greater Philadelphia, a private nonprofit which produces the Subaru Cherry Blossom Festival of Greater Philadelphia.

== Donation of murals ==
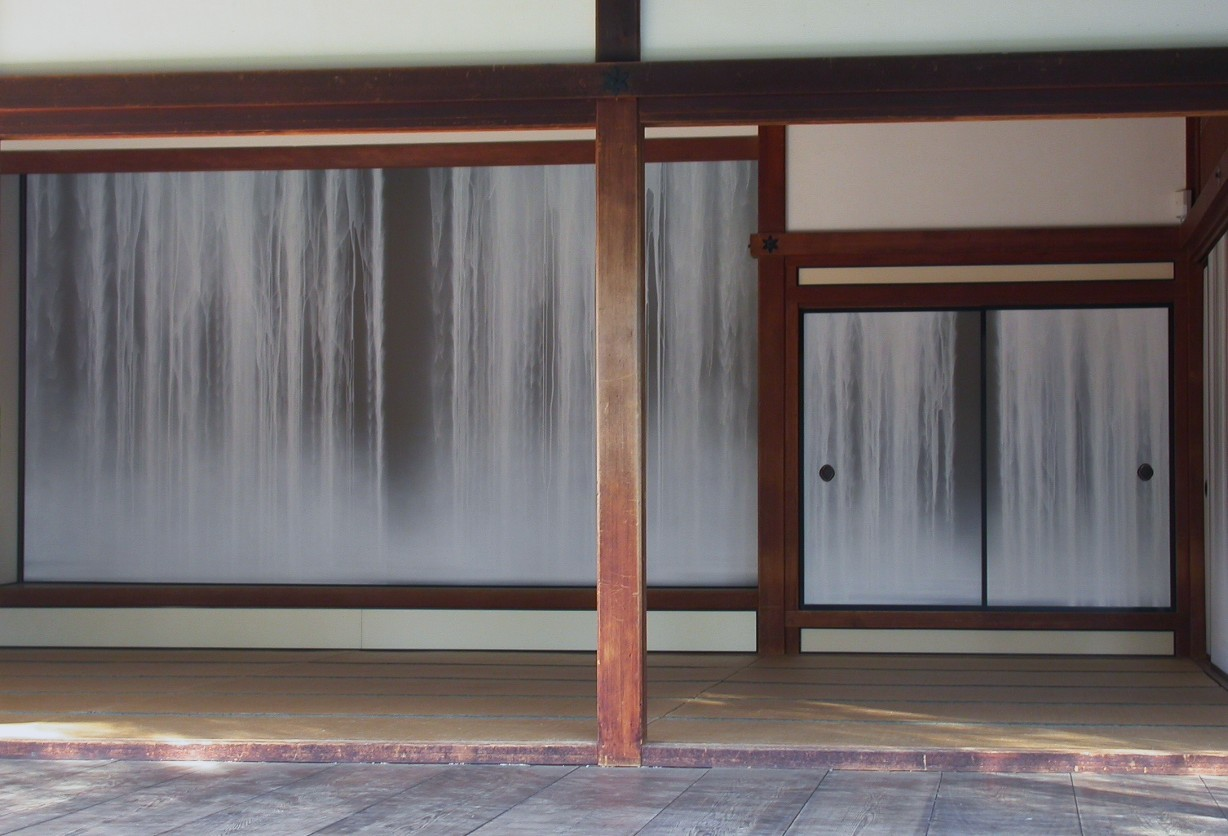
Water Curtain by Hiroshi Senju

The tokonoma alcove and fusuma sliding doors of Shofuso at MoMA were decorated with murals painted in black ink by Kaii Higashiyama. All were destroyed by vandalism. In 2003, the internationally acclaimed Japanese painter, Hiroshi Senju offered to donate twenty murals to Shofuso. Senju's murals depict waterfalls in a custom "Shofuso color" created by blending colors extracted from the elements in the house and garden. The paintings were rendered on mulberry paper specially fabricated by a master paper maker.

Shofuso is the first and only place in the United States to house a combination of Japanese contemporary art in the background of traditional Japanese architecture. The City of Philadelphia dedicated Senju's murals on April 27, 2007, and Mayor John F. Street issued a proclamation naming April 27 "Senju Day".

== Architecture ==
Shofuso was modeled after the guest house of Kojo-in, a sub-temple of Mii-dera in the city of Ōtsu, built in 1601. The guest house at Kojo-in had all the four major components of shoin-zukuri architecture; (1) attached desk, (2) staggered shelf, (3) toko-no-ma alcove, and (4) chodai-gamae (built-in ornamental doorway). It was built following set of standards that determined the proportions of each element of the building. Following these guidelines, carpenters and builders could achieve an overall architectural harmony. Architect Yoshimura modified the design of Kojo-in to fit in the courtyard of MoMA and added a kitchen, bath and tea house to create a functional house. He created neither a replica of Kojo-in, nor an original building but a design that would help the American public understand Japanese traditional architecture. The tea house was modeled after the famous tea house "Masu-doko-no-seki" in Juko-in, subtemple of Daitoku-ji temple in Kyoto.

== Garden ==
Shofuso's garden
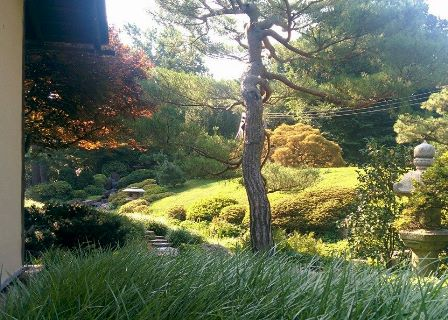
- Bright haze looking at the waterfall from the Tea Garden
- Interactive map of Shofuso's garden
- Location: Horticultural and Lansdowne Drs. West Fairmount Park, Philadelphia, United States
- Coordinates: 39.9814°N 75.213°W
- Area: 1.2 acres (0.49 ha)
- Created: 1958
- Designer: Tansai Sano
- Operator: Friends of the Japanese House and Garden
- Visitors: 18,000
- Open: April through October
- Designation: National Register of Historic Places

Shofuso's garden at MoMA was designed by Tansai Sano, a landscape architect in Kyoto whose family had been caretakers of the famous dry garden in Ryoan-ji temple for six generations. Eighty main stones were shipped from the old temple, which was located in central Japan. The original garden at Fairmount Park was built by Y. Muto for the temple gate in 1909. Muto also built the Water and Hill Garden and Hill-Cloud Garden at Morris Arboretum in Philadelphia and the Japanese garden at Maymont in Richmond, Virginia. During the 1957 installation of his new garden designed to accommodate Shofuso after its move from New York, Tansai Sano modified the design by installing a waterfall and adding new planting scheme. In 1976, at the time of major restoration, Ken Nakajima further modified it installing the berm. The Journal of Japanese Gardening named Shofuso the third-ranked Japanese garden in North America in 2004, 2008, and 2013 out of more than 300 Japanese gardens in North America.

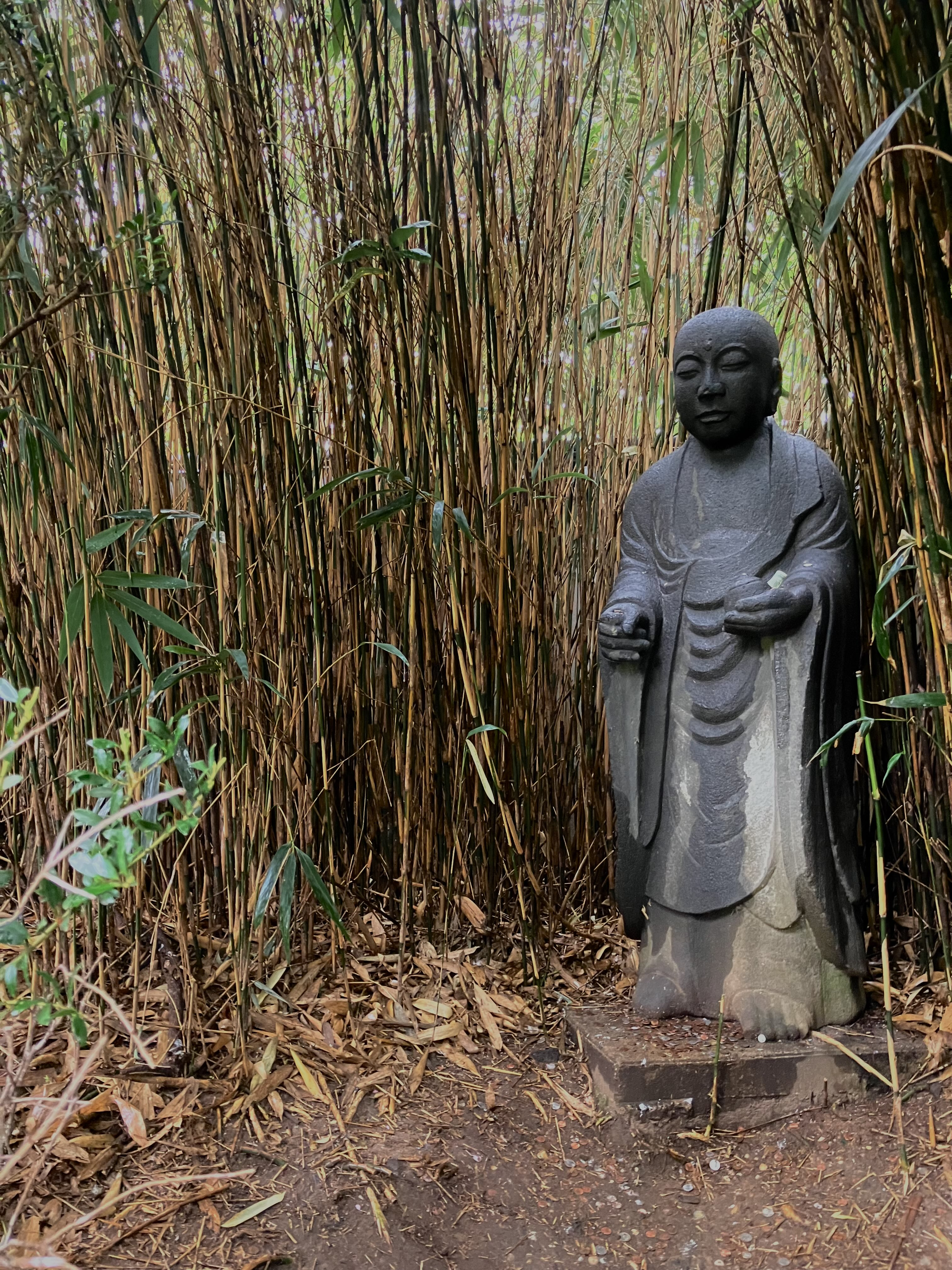
Japanese Monk Statue in the Garden

== See also ==
- List of houses in Fairmount Park
- List of Japanese gardens in the United States
- Philadelphia Register of Historic Places
