= Shofuso Cherry Blossom Festival =

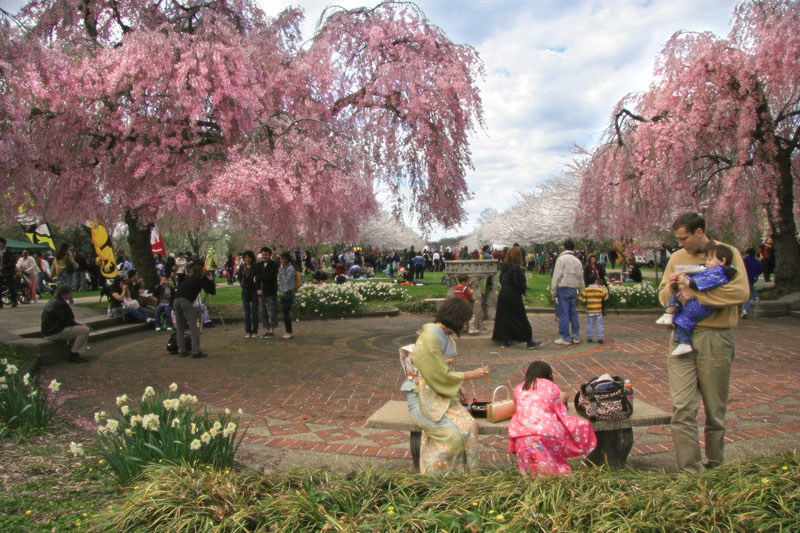
Horticulture Center, Fairmount Park, Philadelphia. The large trees in the foreground are part of the original 1926 plantings donated by the Japanese government.

The Subaru Cherry Blossom Festival of Greater Philadelphia, at Shofuso Japanese House and Garden, is an annual spring celebration based on the Japanese custom of Hanami (cherry blossom viewing). The festival, which is presented by the Japan America Society of Greater Philadelphia, commemorates a 1926 gift of 1,600 cherry blossom trees from Japan to the city of Philadelphia.

== History ==
In honor of the 150th anniversary of American independence and as a gesture of goodwill, the Japanese government donated 1,600 cherry trees and other flowering trees to the city of Philadelphia in 1926.

In 1998, continuing the legacy of the original gift of trees, the Japan America Society of Greater Philadelphia made a 10-year pledge to plant 1,000 new cherry blossom trees in Philadelphia. About 250 people attended a dinner at Fairmount Park's Memorial Hall to help fund the costs of buying and planting the first 100 of Philadelphia's new cherry trees. Following that, there was a tree planting ceremony to celebrate the installation of the new cherry trees.

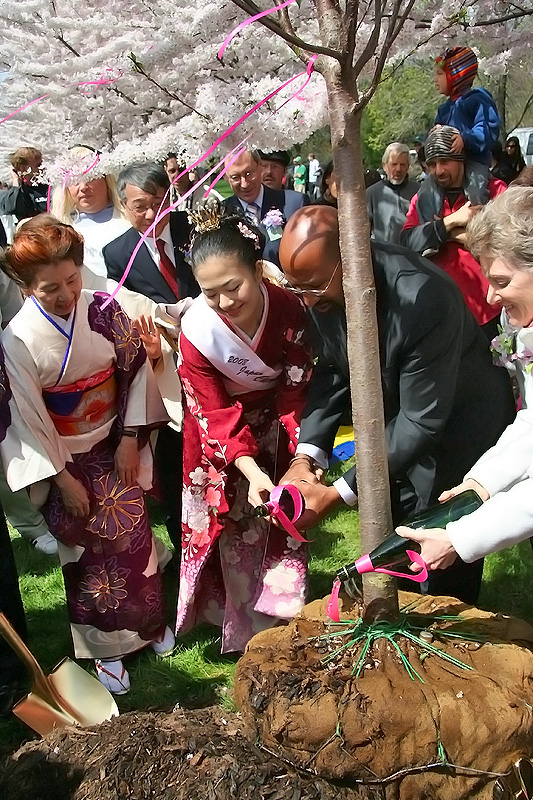
Tree planting ceremony with Japan's Cherry Blossom Queen and Philadelphia Mayor Michael Nutter.

The cherry tree planting and fundraising continued for a few years at the same modest level, staying mostly within the Japanese and Japanese-American community in Philadelphia. The celebrations were lively but intimate, as the cherry tree planting project had not yet entered the public's awareness.

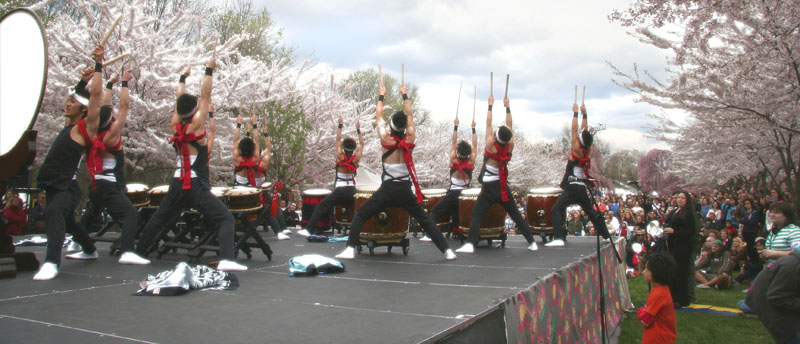
Sakura Sunday 2008 -- Main event of the Subaru Cherry Blossom Festival of Greater Philadelphia.

As the number of cherry blossom trees grew and the tree planting project began to attract more attention, Philadelphia started to become recognized a suitable venue for a Japanese style celebration of spring. In 2003, Subaru of America, Inc., located just across the river in Cherry Hill, NJ, increased its support of the cherry tree planting project with title sponsorship, and the Subaru Cherry Blossom Festival of Greater Philadelphia was born. Two days of events expanded to one full week, and grew again in 2005 to two whole weeks of Japanese cultural festivities.

Having completed the ten-year goal of 1,000 tree plantings in 2007, the Japan America Society of Greater Philadelphia created a new 5-year plan to bring cherry blossom trees to 10 community parks throughout the City of Philadelphia. The Shofuso Cherry Blossom Festival continues as a means of supporting the ongoing tree planting project, and moreover honoring and celebrating the Japanese government's 1926 gift of goodwill and springtime festivity.

2020 saw the first cancellation caused by the COVID-19 pandemic. The festival has been resumed for 2022, and will take place in West Fairmount Park from April 8 to April 10, 2022.

In March 2023, the festival was renamed back as Subaru Cherry Blossom Festival of Greater Philadelphia, with title sponsorship from Subaru of America.

== Events ==
The Shofuso Cherry Blossom Festival of Greater Philadelphia features many cultural events such as music performances, workshops, online concerts and lectures to explore Japanese culture.

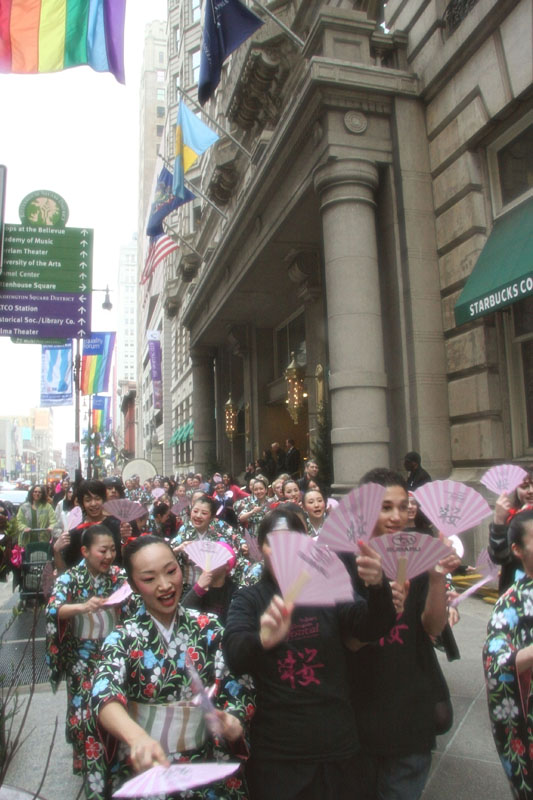
Sidewalk Parade 2008 -- An event of the Subaru Cherry Blossom Festival of Greater Philadelphia

Sakura Sunday, an outdoor Japanese cultural fair that takes place at the Horticulture Center in Fairmount Park, is the festival's largest event. Family and friends come together under the blossoms to experience performances, meet visitors from Japan, and watch the Festival tree planting ceremony.

== See also ==
- Hanami
- Japan America Society of Greater Philadelphia
- Sakura
- National Cherry Blossom Festival
