= Marcel Breuer House and Studio =

Historic house in Massachusetts, United States

- U.S. National Register of Historic Places
- Location within Cape Cod Location within Massachusetts Location within the United States
- Location: 634 Black Pond Road, Wellfleet, Massachusetts
- Coordinates: 41°57′53″N 70°0′35″W
- Area: 4.2 acres (1.7 ha)
- Built: 1949
- Architect: Marcel Breuer
- Architectural style: Modern
- NRHP reference No.: 100010568
- Added to NRHP: July 29, 2024

The Marcel Breuer House and Studio, initially known as the Breuer Cottage in his official papers, is a historic property at 634 Black Pond Road in Wellfleet, Massachusetts. Built in 1949 and enlarged in 1962 to designs by Marcel Breuer, it served as a summer retreat and experimental architecture landscape for the architect until his retirement in 1976. The property remains in the Breuer family, and includes an extensive collection of art and design works collected by Breuer. The property was listed on the National Register of Historic Places in 2024.

== Description and history ==
The Marcel Breuer House and Studio stand in a remote area of the Cape Cod National Seashore in eastern Wellfleet, on 4.2 acres (1.7 ha) overlooking Williams and Higgins Ponds. The house and studio form an L shape joined by a covered breezeway, and stand near the northern end of the predominantly wooded property. The house is a single-story woodframe structure, designed in a "long house" form Breuer used for a number of other houses he designed. The exterior is clad in vertical tongue-and-groove siding with a weathered silver coloration. The north and west walls are largely devoid of windows, while the east and south sides have expansive windows providing views of the nearby ponds. An open porch projects eastward over the landscape. The interior is divided into an open-plan public space to the east, with private rooms and facilities to the west.

The house was built in 1949, and was the third of four houses Breuer designed and built for his family. In 1962 Breuer and on the studio, like the house a rectangular single-story structure. Breuer used the studio until he retired from professional work in 1976, and his descendants continue to own the property, which is an inholding within the Cape Cod National Seashore. Breuer designed three other homes in the area using the same basic "long box" form. After the house was threatened with demolition, the Cape Cod Modern House Trust acquired it in 2024 and restored it the next year.

== See also ==
- Marcel Breuer House II, one of two family homes in New Canaan, Connecticut
- National Register of Historic Places listings in Barnstable County, Massachusetts
- National Register of Historic Places listings in Cape Cod National Seashore
