= Japan America Society of Greater Philadelphia =

U.S. nonprofit organization

Coordinates: 39.94911°N 75.16453°W

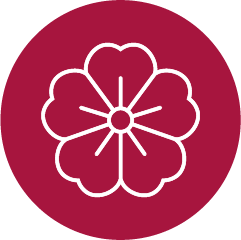
- Founded: 1994
- Type: Private Non-Profit
- Location: Philadelphia, Pennsylvania
- Region served: Greater Philadelphia
- Website: www.japanphilly.org

The Japan America Society of Greater Philadelphia (JASGP) is a private nonprofit and nonpartisan organization that promotes arts, business, and cultural exchange between the United States and Japan in the Greater Philadelphia region. The organization operates Shofuso, produces the Subaru Cherry Blossom Festival of Greater Philadelphia, and offers public educational and business programs.

It has EIN 23-2223316 as a 501(c)(3) Public Charity; in 2024, it claimed total revenue of $1,128,603 and total assets of $187,448. A separate Friends of the Japanese House & Garden claims total revenue of $794,709 and total assets of $292,087.

== History ==
The Japan America Society of Greater Philadelphia was incorporated in 1994 in Philadelphia, Pennsylvania. It is a member of National Association of Japan-America Societies, a national non-profit U.S. network dedicated to public education about Japan. JASGP is the second largest Japan American Society, after the Japan Society in Manhattan.

In 1998, JASGP began a citywide beautification program planting ornamental cherry blossom trees in Fairmount Park and along the banks of Philadelphia's Schuylkill River. This program became the Subaru Cherry Blossom Festival of Greater Philadelphia in 2003 following a title sponsorship from Subaru of America.

In 2016, JASGP merged with Friends of the Japanese House and Garden, a private nonprofit which operated Shofuso Japanese House and Garden beginning in 1982. Built in 1953 in Nagoya, Japan, for an exhibition at New York City's Museum of Modern Art, Shofuso relocated to Fairmount Park and was constructed on the site of a Japanese garden built during the 1876 Centennial Exposition.

JASGP commemorated Shofuso's 60th anniversary season in Fairmount Park in 2018. Events included an annual general meeting at Philadelphia City Hall and a series of special programs on site at Shofuso.

== Programs ==
- Shofuso Japanese House and Garden
- Subaru Cherry Blossom Festival of Greater Philadelphia
- US-Japan Business and Public Policy Series

== See also ==
- National Cherry Blossom Festival
