= Stillman House I =

House in Litchfield, Connecticut

Marcel Breuer Stillman House
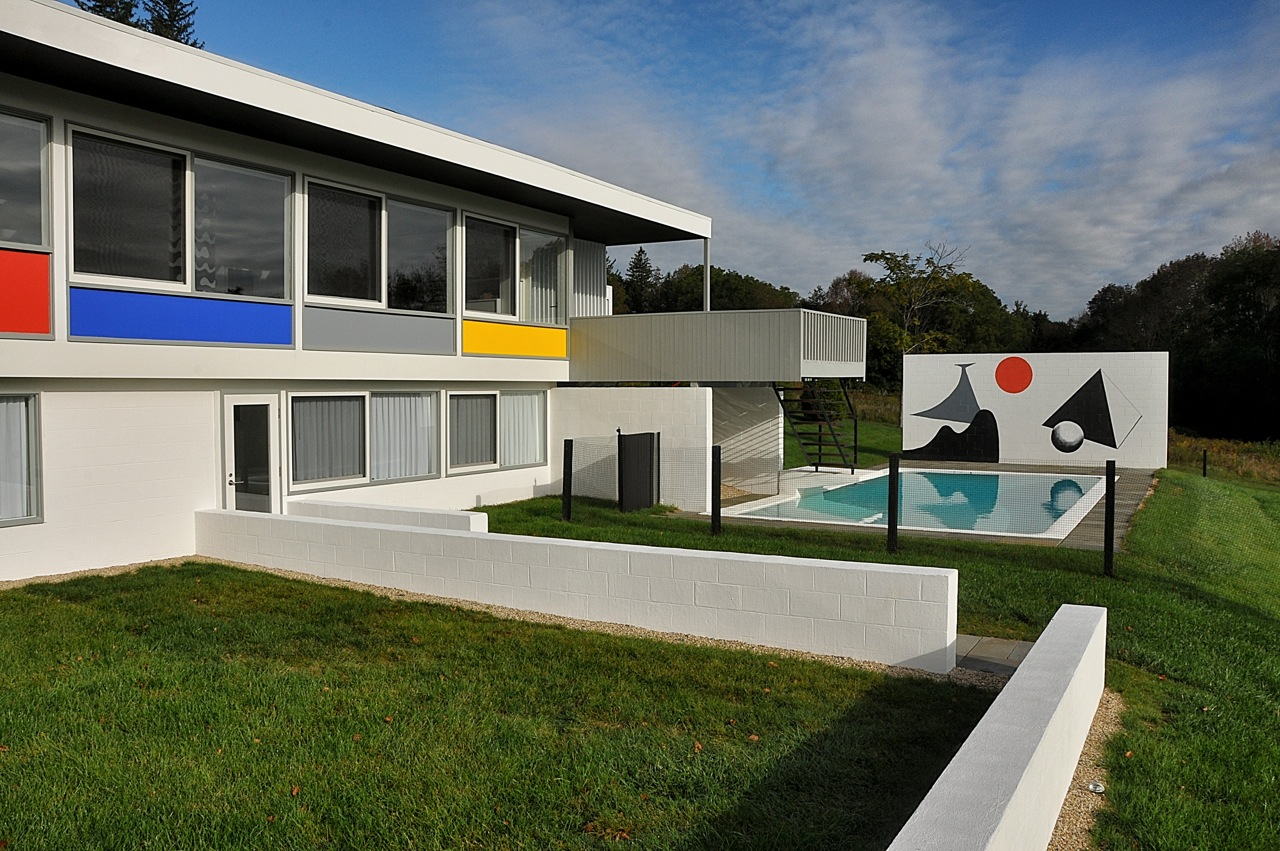
- Interactive map of the Marcel Breuer Stillman House area

General information
- Type: Two-Story Long House
- Architectural style: Modern
- Location: Beecher Lane, Litchfield, Connecticut, US
- Coordinates: 41.7542°N 73.1885°W
- Elevation: 1,070 ft (330 m)
- Construction started: 1950
- Completed: 1951
- Cost: ~$23,000 (1950)
- Client: Rufus and Leslie Stillman

Technical details
- Structural system: Steel, Wood, Glass
- Floor count: 2

Design and construction
- Architect: Marcel Breuer

Stillman House I was designed by Marcel Breuer in Litchfield, Connecticut, United States, in 1950. It follows Breuer's demonstration "House in the Museum Garden" built the year before for the Museum of Modern Art, which now sits at the Rockefeller Kykuit estate in New York's Hudson Valley. The site boasts three separate architectural commissions by Breuer between 1950–1953: a main house, a studio, and pool and porch redesign, with the latter featuring an 18'x10' pool mural wall by friend and sculptor, Alexander Calder. During this time, fellow first-generation Bauhaus friend and artist, Xanti Schawinsky, executed an interior mural wall as well.

The Stillman House sits adjacent the Huvelle House (1953) by John M. Johansen and together, they represent the first and second modern homes in Litchfield, existing between a forest reserve and the town's historic North Street. In 1953, the Stillmans decided to split their 6-acre property in two, inviting the Huvelles to join their modern experience on the condition their choice of architect was to remain modern. John Johansen, fellow Harvard Five architect and student and associate of Breuer, built the adjacent home. The house is a study in simple form, natural light, and thoughtful design. It also sits in complementary juxtaposition to the Stillman House in appreciation of its patterned use of glass, primary color panels and pool mural.

Although Stillman House was the beginning of a client-architect friendship and collaboration that spanned 30 plus years, the house serves as important reminder to what creative thinking and out-of-town influence can do. To date, and in reaction to these homes, the Borough of Litchfield restricts the further use of modern design within its borough's historic boundaries as protection to its Colonial and Greek Revival heritage. Nevertheless, what has become clear to everyone familiar with these homes is just how complementary and special they have become in telling the history of Litchfield's architectural heritage.

Both Stillman House I and the Huvelle House were restored in the 2010s, garnering a 2014 Citations of Merit from Docomomo US, with the jury noting "in addition to repairing structural damage, the owners removed later additions to the Stillman House and returned a removed floating porch and staircase to a Breuer-designed swimming pool. [. . .] For both houses, all glass was replaced, interior volumes were returned to scale where changed, and all original design detailing was closely observed."

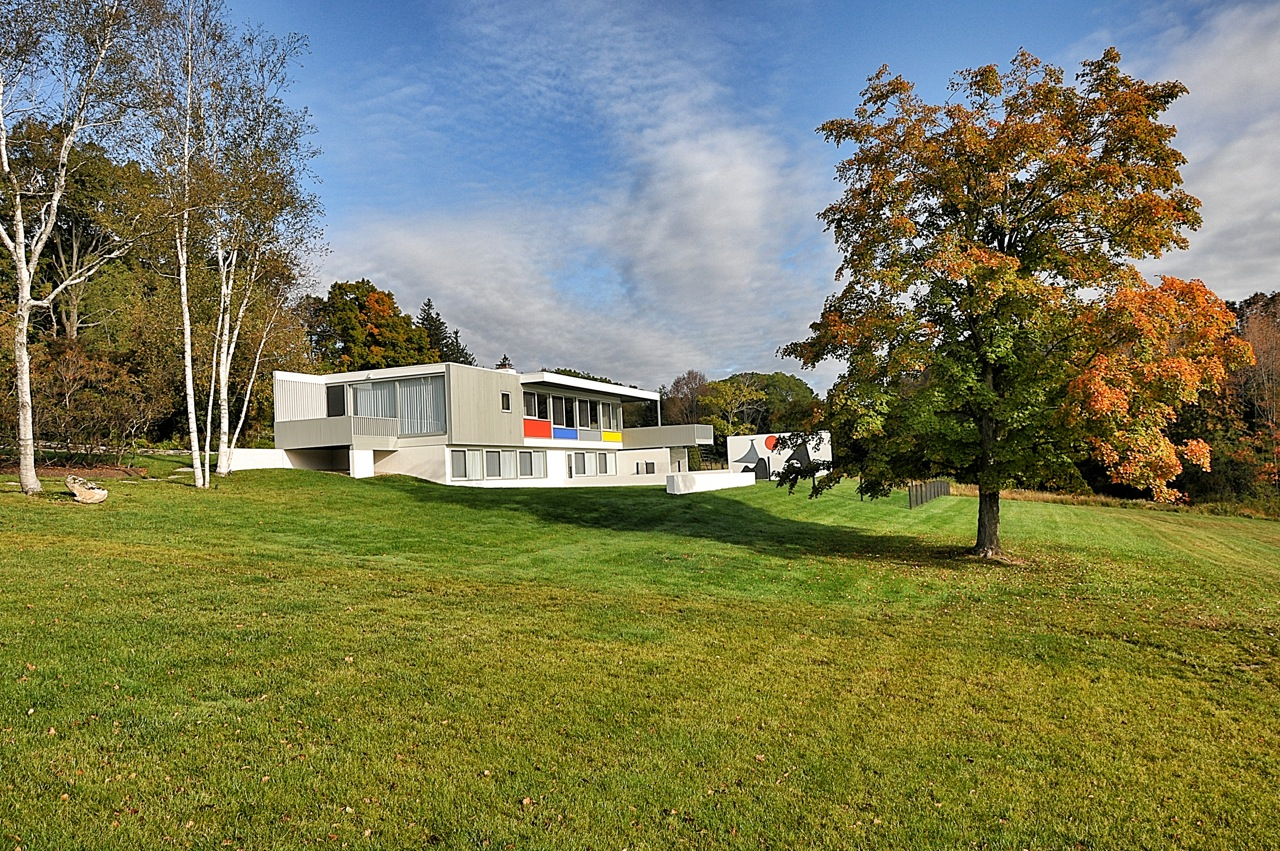
Stillman Back

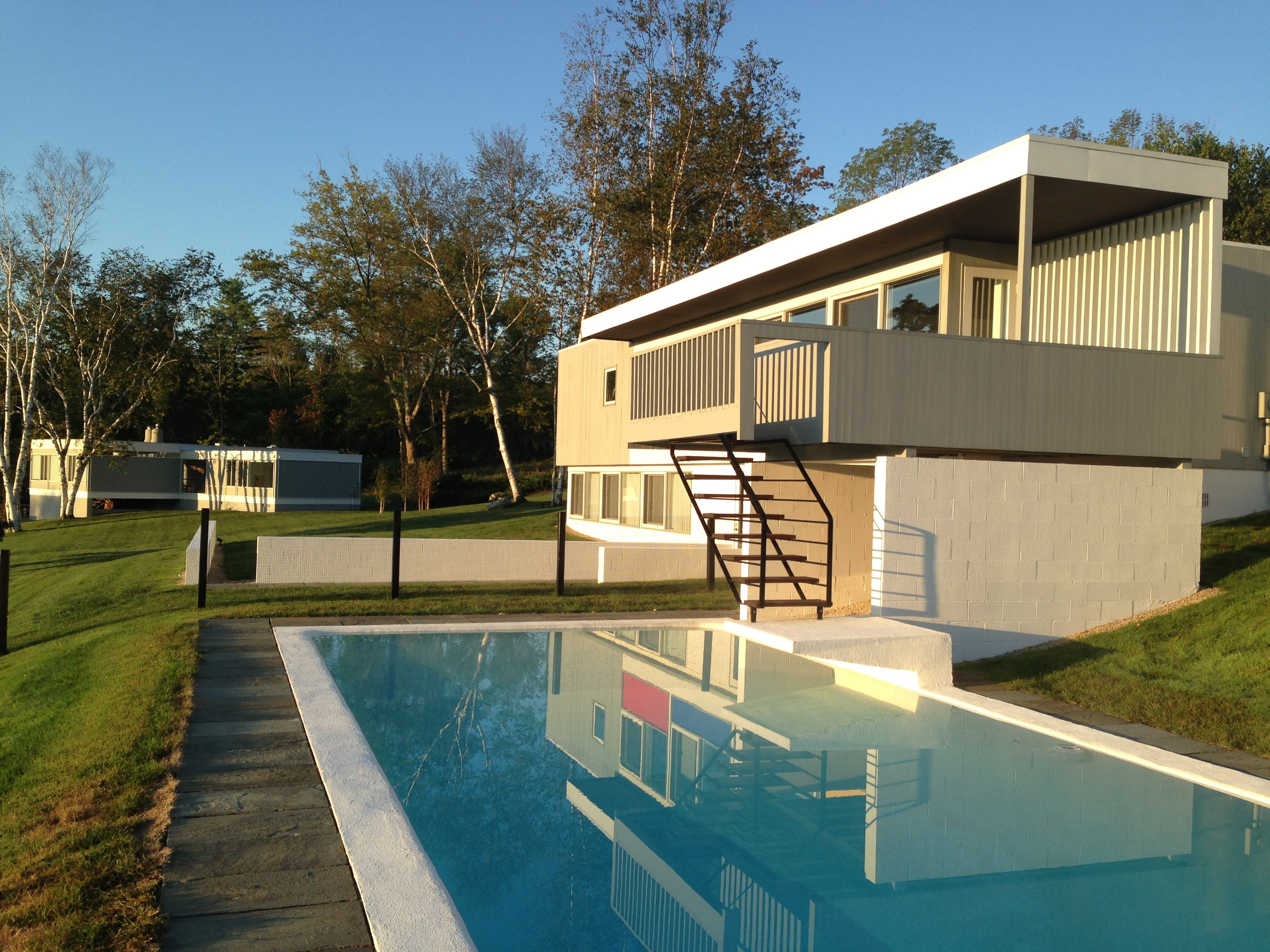
Stillman Pool

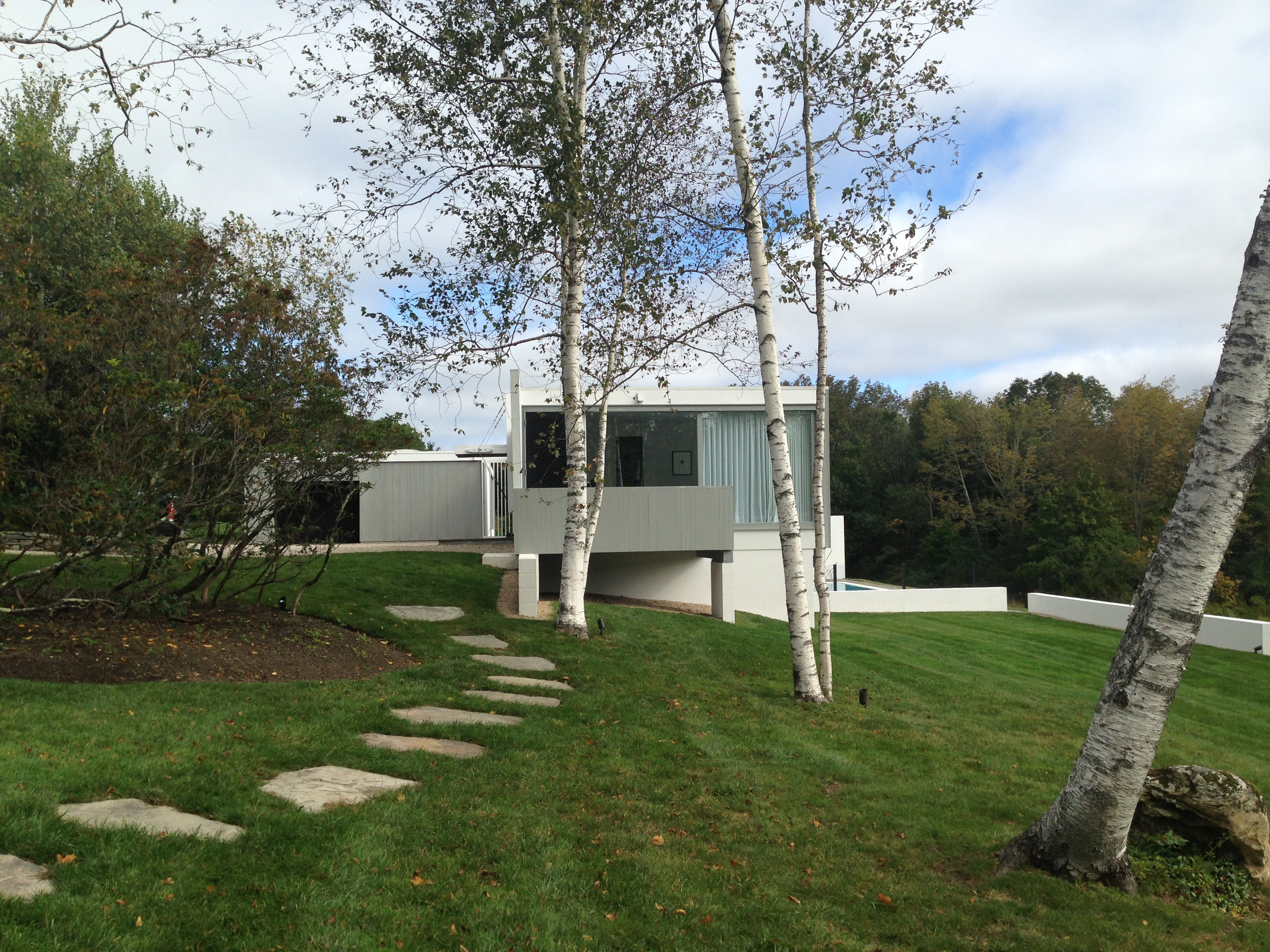
Stillman South Side

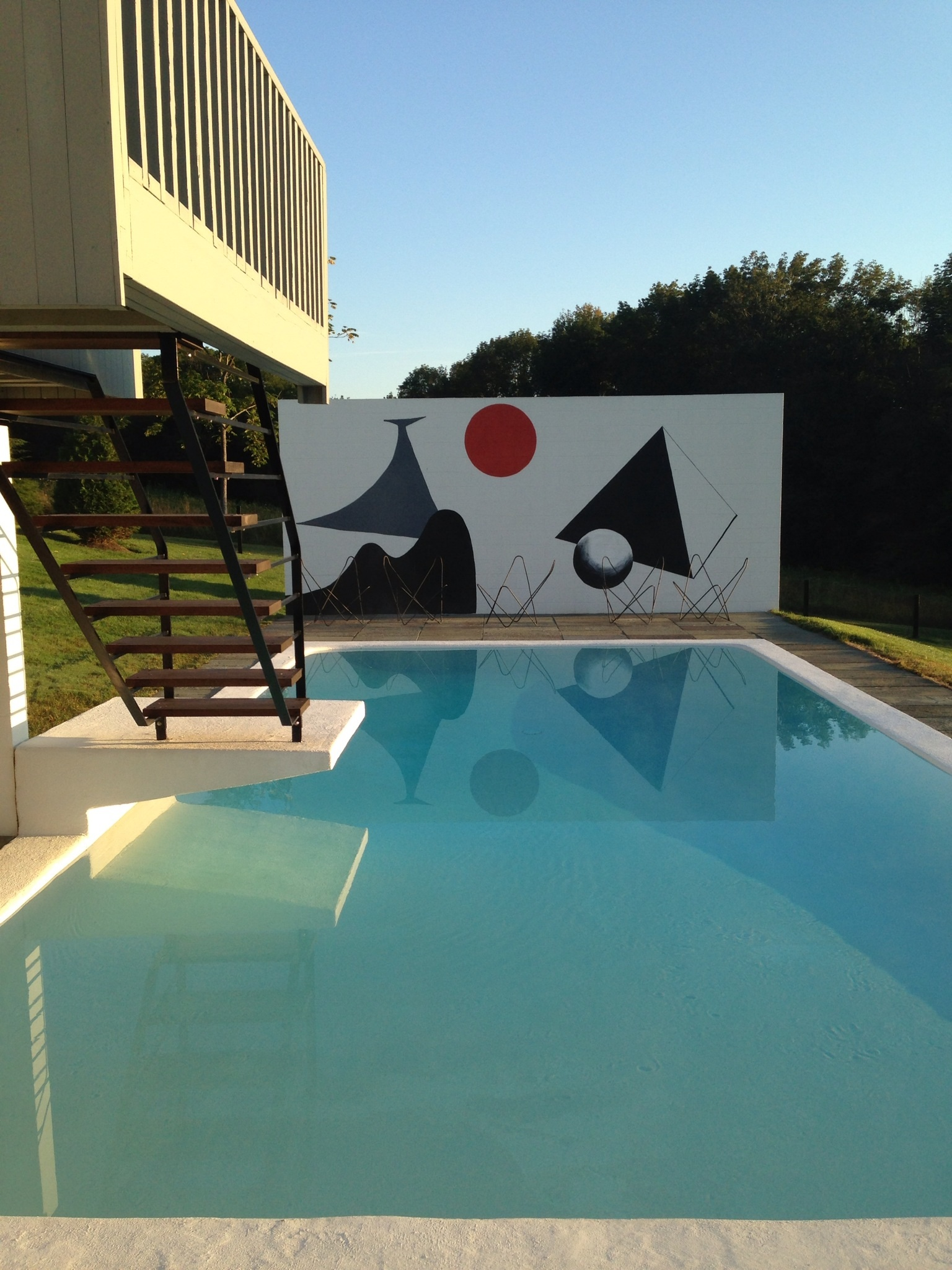
Stillman Pool and Mural wall

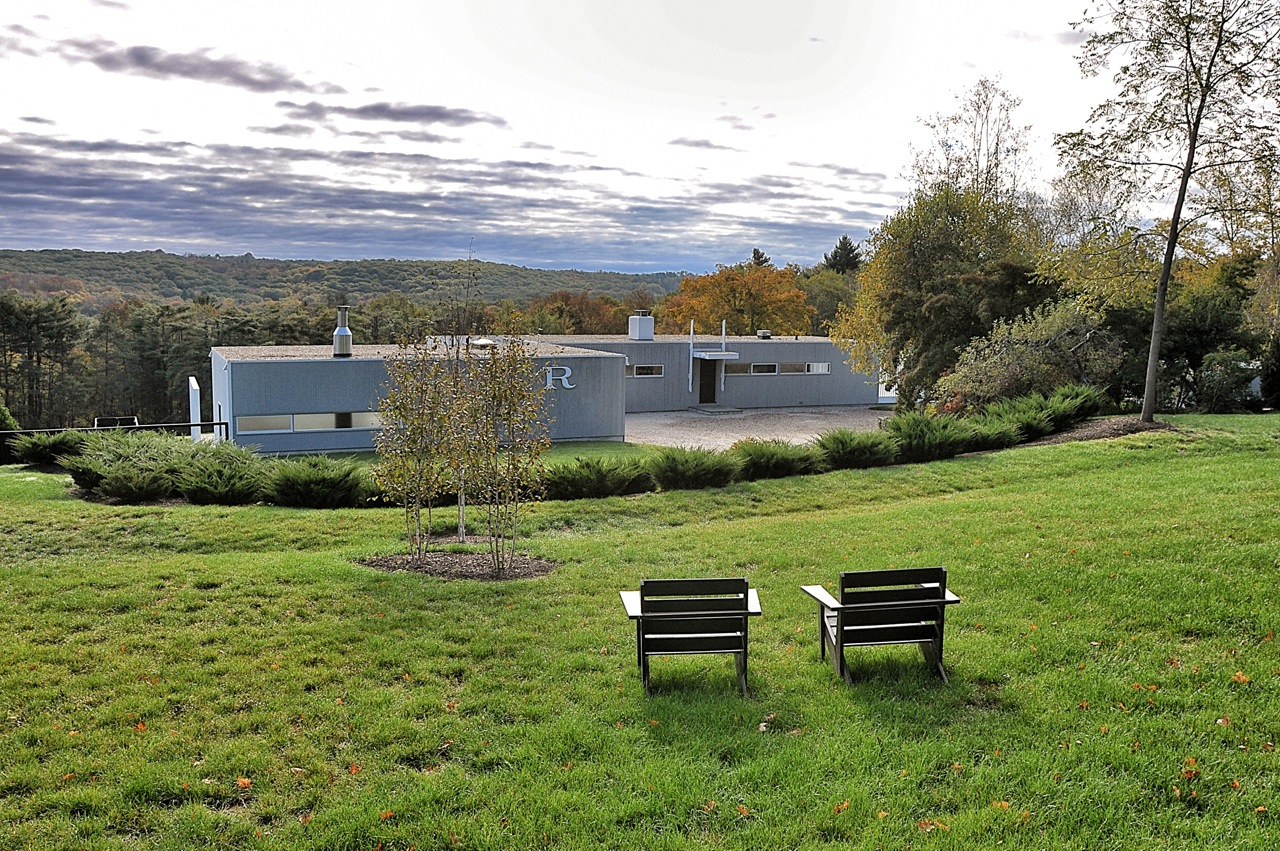
Stillman Front

== Sources and further information ==
=== Stillman House ===
- Syracuse University: Marcel Breuer Files:"Stillman House"
- Smithsonian Institution and Archives of American Art (with Alexander Calder Mural Wall): " Stillman House in Marcel Breuer Files"
- Gregory Ain "House in Garden" Exhibit for Moma "Gregory Ain "House in Garden"
- The Making of a New England Town: "The Making of a New England Town"
- New York Times: "In Our Time"
- do.co.mo.mo International Publication: "In Our Time, Page 9"
- Correspondence between Rufus and Leslie Stillman and Marcel Breuer (60 letters) at the Smithsonian Institution and Archives of American Art: "Marcel Breuer papers, 1920–1986"
- Litchfield Historic Society, "In Our Own Time: Modern Architecture in Litchfield: 1949–1970"
- Maquette for pool mural "Litchfield Historical Society"

=== Marcel Breuer ===
- Site:"Biographical data and resources"
- Selected works: "Timeline"
