= Marcel Breuer House at Pocantico =

Modernist house in Pocantico Hills, New York

Coordinates: 41°5′33″N 73°50′23″W

A plan of the house

The Marcel Breuer House at Pocantico is a wood-frame modernist-style house at the Pocantico estate in Pocantico Hills, New York, United States. It was designed by Marcel Breuer as part of the 1949 "House in the Museum Garden" exhibit at New York City's Museum of Modern Art (MoMA), curated by Philip Johnson, MoMA's director. The museum had made plans to exhibit a modernist house in its garden in 1948, to be designed by Frank Lloyd Wright, but design of the exhibit was instead awarded to Breuer. The exhibit opened in April 1949 and received 80,000 visitors over six months, becoming one of MoMA's most popular exhibits to date. After the MoMA exhibition ended, House in the Museum Garden was disassembled and taken to Pocantico, where it was reassembled by the Rockefeller family in 1950.

The design was intended to be constructed in two phases: the first phase consisted of two bedrooms for a family with young children, and additional rooms could be built as the children grew. The facade uses cypress board, with plate glass windows, and a roof with a V-shaped cross-section. Stone seating areas and standalone louvers partition the open space outside the house into several zones. Inside are stone floors that conceal a radiant heating system, along with wooden floors and ceilings. As designed, the bedrooms are placed at either end of the building, while communal areas such as living and dining rooms are situated centrally. One side of the house has a mezzanine. Closets and storage space are placed throughout the interior, and when the exhibit was displayed at MoMA, it was fully outfitted with interiors and furnishings designed mostly by Breuer. The Marcel Breuer House at Pocantico's design received mixed commentary from art and architecture critics, but its popularity helped increase public awareness of Breuer's designs.

== History ==
=== MoMA exhibit ===
Philip Johnson became the director of New York City's Museum of Modern Art (MoMA) in 1947. Originally, he wanted to display a house designed by the modernist architect Frank Lloyd Wright in the museum's rear garden. Although the museum had planned to display one of Wright's Usonian houses, this never happened. By 1948, MoMA was planning to exhibit a modernist house in the garden as part of a larger effort to display houses by modernist architects. At the time, middle-class houses were rapidly being developed in New York City's suburbs, but the idea of a modernist design in MoMA's garden was met with apprehension, even among MoMA's members. Additionally, experimental modern houses were being developed on the West Coast, at the opposite end of the United States. A writer for The Architectural Review retrospectively said that Johnson had been motivated to exhibit a house at MoMA after seeing the popularity of a Lustron house that had been exhibited on a vacant lot nearby, although the historian Barry Bergdoll said the MoMA series was not intended to compete with the Lustron house.

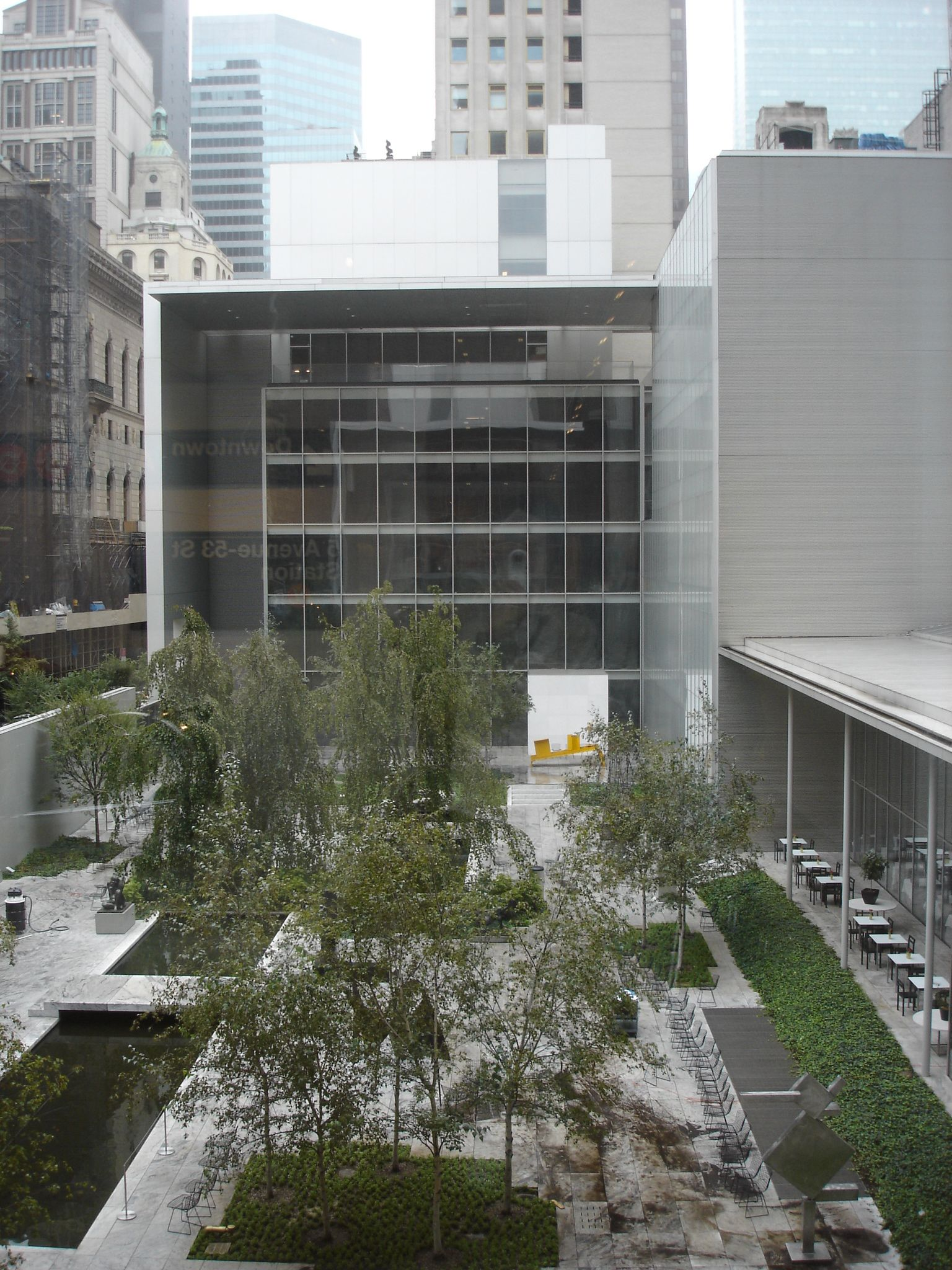
The house was exhibited in MoMA's rear garden (pictured).

Even while Wright was under the impression that he would be hired to design such a house for MoMA's garden, the museum approached fellow modernist architect Marcel Breuer, who devised a design that could be constructed in two phases. MoMA curator Peter Blake later said that, while it had been "a trifle bizarre at the time" to approach Breuer for a design, the museum's trustees did not want to hire other architects such as Wright and Ludwig Mies van der Rohe for various reasons. More specifically, the museum had already hosted exhibitions of Wright's and Mies's work, but not Breuer's. The trustees also had confidence that Breuer would be able to design an inexpensive house, as opposed to Wright, whom they said "is not particularly interested in low cost building". The historian Robert McCarter wrote that the trustees' cost concerns were not entirely founded, since Wright had been able to design low-cost Usonian houses for no more than $5,000, (Note: Equivalent to $67,000 in 2025) and some of Breuer's houses overran their budgets. The Murphy-Brinkworth Construction Company was hired to construct the exhibit, and by January 1949, the frame was being constructed. The exhibit was situated in the garden's eastern portion, providing space for the Whitney Museum to erect a building in the western portion.

The House in the Museum Garden exhibit opened on April 12 or April 14, 1949, for a run of six months. It charged a 35-cent admission fee, (Note: Equivalent to $4.74 in 2025) attracting 35,000 visitors by July and 80,000 visitors over its duration. The exhibition was accompanied by a museum booklet with details about the house, as well as Blake's biography of Breuer. In June 1949, two financial institutions offered to lend between $15,000 and $18,000 (Note: Equivalent to $203,000–244,000 in 2025) to anyone who wanted to build a replica of House in the Museum Garden in the suburbs. The exhibit concluded on October 30 that year. At a time when the American public was extremely interested in exhibitions of houses at museums, House in the Museum Garden was one of MoMA's most popular exhibits to date. No other modernist-style model houses in New York City had opened to the public throughout the exhibition's duration. Breuer's design was one of several modernist houses ultimately exhibited at MoMA; it was followed by a 1950 design by Gregory Ain and a 1954 Japanese model house that later became the Shofuso Japanese House and Garden. All three exhibitions had been targeted at the tastes of the growing American middle class.

=== Pocantico ===
After the House in the Museum Garden exhibition closed, the businessman and future U.S. Vice President Nelson Rockefeller bought the building in 1950. The house was disassembled and reconstructed at Pocantico, the Rockefeller family's estate in Westchester County, New York. The Rockefeller family modified the house to make it usable, adding electric wiring and plumbing. The Rockefellers also enlarged the garage and converted a partition between the kitchen and living room into a full wall, although other elements of the original design, such as the floors, were not re-assembled.

For over a half-century, the Breuer house at Pocantico was used by various members of the Rockefeller family. Nelson did not live in the Marcel Breuer House, instead living in the estate's main house, Kykuit. Nelson's younger brother Winthrop Rockefeller, later to become the Governor of Arkansas, instead used the Breuer house, though he did not spend much time at Pocantico in adulthood. The National Trust for Historic Preservation took over the Marcel Breuer House at Pocantico in 2007. The house subsequently underwent renovations. Restoration architects outfitted the house with mid-century architecture similar to those used at the original House in the Museum Garden, including the Breuer-designed Wassily chair and pieces designed by fellow modernist Eero Saarinen.

== Description ==
The Marcel Breuer House at Pocantico was designed by Marcel Breuer, who intended that the house be constructed in two phases. In the first phase, two bedrooms would be built for a family with young children; as the children grew older, additional rooms could be added. Breuer had designed the house on the assumption that it would be inefficient to build a residence for less than $20,000. (Note: Equivalent to $271,000 in 2025) The cost of the first phase is variously cited as $18,000–21,960, (Note: Equivalent to $244,000–297,000 in 2025) while the full house's cost (incorporating both phases) is variously cited as $24,000–27,475. (Note: Equivalent to $325,000–372,000 in 2025) (Note: The following figures are given: First phase: $18,000, $20,000, or $21,960; Full house: $24,000, $25,000, $27,000, or $27,475) This cost covered only the house's construction and excluded other expenses such as land acquisition. The mezzanine was to be built in the second phase; the MoMA exhibit showed the plans as they appeared after the completion of both phases. The house was intended for sites of at least 0.5 acres (0.20 ha). According to Breuer, the design and materials were chosen so that an identical house could be constructed by anyone without encountering "unusual technical problems".

=== Exterior ===
The facade of the Marcel Breuer House at Pocantico uses cypress boards laid vertically in a tongue-and-groove pattern. The windows are made of plate glass and shielded by deep overhanging eaves at the roofline. The kitchen has an observation panel from which parents occupying the house could observe their children outside. Stone seating areas and standalone louvers partition the open space outside the house into several zones, including a patio, garden, and yard. These zones correspond to the rooms that adjoined them; for example, the service yard connects with the utility room, while the outdoor play area connects with the children's playroom. The outdoor spaces could be accessed from any of the rooms. Walls with vertical slats also extend from the facade. Also outside the building are stairs connecting with the mezzanine, which are suspended from stainless-steel cables.

The building has an inverse-pitched butterfly roof, which has a V-shaped cross-section with a crease down the middle. The "V" is asymmetrical, being placed approximately one-fourth of the way down the house's length; as such, one side of the V extends higher than the other, covering a mezzanine level which contains the parents' bedrooms. The roof has a drainage pipe extending through the center of the V, eliminating the need for gutters despite the inverted shape. The design of the roof was intended to solve the issue of leaks in other modernist houses' flat roofs. Glass wool in the roof and two layers of boards in the walls provide insulation to the rooms.

=== Interior ===
Interior layout

The floors have stone panels, which are intended to conceal a radiant heating system, embedded within a concrete slab underneath. The woodwork used inside is similar in color to the original furnishings. The walls are largely made of rectangular plywood blocks, which were originally tinted "Breuer blue"; cypress boards are used in some locations. The ceilings also use cypress boards for the most part, though electric heating panels are used in the ceilings of the bathrooms. Horizontal strips of fluorescent light are embedded into the living room, and there are also pointed lamps on the ceiling and indirect lights above the windows.

==== Layout ====
The biographer Isabelle Hyman wrote in 1999 that the layout was an example of Breuer's "binuclear" house designs—a type of layout wherein rooms were segregated based on their function. The placement of the rooms was intended to increase efficiency and comported with Breuer's beliefs about how houses should be laid out. As designed, the bedrooms are placed at either end of the building, while communal areas are situated centrally. The house was set up so that, when the second phase was completed, the parents and children could have their own sides of the house; alternatively, the parents' bedroom could be converted into a guest bedroom.

The living room extends out onto the exterior terrace, with a large fireplace on one wall. The dining room and kitchen are adjacent to the living room. Next to the kitchen was a utility room, which could accommodate various uses. The children's bedroom, originally on the east side of the house, has two beds and a side table on opposite walls. A playroom adjoins the children's bedroom, overlooking one of the outdoor terraces; it was sometimes described as a hallway due to its narrow dimensions. On the opposite (originally west) side of the house is the parents' bedroom, which at MoMA was separated from the living room by only a curtain. Further bedrooms on the mezzanine are accessed both by the exterior stairs and by another flight indoors. This mezzanine overhangs a garage and has a rope railing.

==== Furnishings ====
Closets and storage space are placed throughout the interior; many of the storage areas consist of little more than open shelves. The house also has cupboards with sliding panels, along with a double-height cabinet separating the dining room and kitchen.

The building was displayed at MoMA as a fully furnished model house, with interiors and furnishings designed mostly by Breuer. The MoMA furnishings included seats with rubber foam upholstery, along with a molded, plywood side table in the living room. There were stacked chairs with Z-shaped cross-sections, along with a coffee table with space for a radio receiver. Two variants of a floor lamp were designed specially for the exhibit, as Breuer did not wish to use portable lamps and wanted the house to be lit indirectly. Breuer also created a combined radio–television–phonograph with dials that the family could turn while sitting on the couch. For the children's playroom, Creative Playthings designed a set of furnishings. The children's furniture consisted of hollow wooden boxes that could be used as chairs, table legs, or storage; one box had wheels and could be used as a cart. Other furnishings were manufactured by Knoll, Inc., to designs by Breuer and Eero Saarinen. When the house was displayed at MoMA, it had artwork by Jean Arp and Alexander Calder.

== Impact ==
The Marcel Breuer House at Pocantico received commentary from art and architecture critics, including Lewis Mumford, who wrote a five-page review for The New Yorker. Mumford wrote that the front facade was "open, easygoing, extroverted, sociable", while the rear was "sober, introverted, a place for study, for withdrawal". Marian Blodgett of the Hartford Courant wrote that the "modern simplicity" of the facade contrasted with the older houses near MoMA and that the parents' downstairs bedroom was the house's "handsomest" room. The Architects' Journal wrote that the exterior areas and the sloped ceiling created a spacious feeling. Frederick Gutheim of the New York Herald Tribune wrote that the layout represented a "misguided and ineffective" ideal of family life, saying that the design did not take practical needs into account. Visitors especially hated the dining room's placement; in four polls, they indicated that they would rather eat in the kitchen in several shifts than to eat in view of the living room. In response to Gutheim's critique, MoMA officials wrote that the exhibit had been intended merely as "a pilot model built to promote certain ideas" and that they had had no input in the design or layout.

Retrospectively, the historian Barry Bergdoll said that the design was "intended to counter Levittown". Bergdoll described the exhibit as the most impactful of the model houses that MoMA exhibited. Isabelle Hyman wrote that the exhibit "spoke to the hunger of the American public" for technological advances, postwar consumer goods, and innovations in house designs. Dwell described it as "one of MoMA's most influential architecture exhibitions of the twentieth century".

The Marcel Breuer House at Pocantico helped increase public awareness of Breuer's designs, and he received numerous commissions to design houses as a direct result. Among the exhibit's visitors were Rufus and Leslie Stillman, a young couple who were interested in constructing a house of their own. The Stillmans had little previous experience with modern architecture, and Breuer ended up designing the Stillman House for the couple in Connecticut. The Stillman family told their acquaintances about Breuer's design, which led to him receiving more commissions. Other exhibit visitors requested Breuer's plans for the house, and in some cases, they developed their own houses with similar design details to the MoMA exhibit. The general plan—a rectangle with an inverted gable roof—became one of several "general plan types" that Breuer would rely on for his future designs.

== See also ==
- List of Marcel Breuer works

== Sources ==
- Bergdoll, Barry (2009). "At Home in The Museum?". Log (15). Anyone Corporation: 35–48. ISSN 1547-4690. JSTOR 41765258.
- Blake, Peter (1949). Marcel Breuer, architect and designer (PDF). The Museum of Modern Art.
- Crump, James (2021). Breuer's Bohemia. New York City: Monacelli Press. ISBN 978-1-58093-578-4.
- Gatje, Robert F. (2000). Marcel Breuer : a memoir. Monacelli Press. ISBN 978-1-58093-029-1.
- "House in New York: Designed by Marcel Breuer". The Architects' Journal. Vol. 109, no. 2834. June 2, 1949. pp. 499–502. ProQuest 1427051182.
- Hyman, Isabelle (2001). Marcel Breuer, Architect: The Career and the Buildings. Harry N. Abrams. ISBN 978-0-8109-4265-3.
- Masello, David (1993). Architecture without rules : the houses of Marcel Breuer and Herbert Beckhard. W.W. Norton. ISBN 978-0-393-03491-2.
- McCarter, Robert (2024). Breuer. Phaidon. ISBN 978-1-83866-947-8.
- Smith, Kathryn (July 12, 2022). Wright on Exhibit: Frank Lloyd Wright's Architectural Exhibitions. Princeton University Press. ISBN 978-0-691-24641-3.
