= National Association of Japan–America Societies =

The National Association of Japan–America Societies, Inc. (Japanese: 全米日米協会連合, Zenbei Nichibei Kyōkai Rengō; NAJAS) is a private, non-profit, non-partisan organization located in Washington, D.C. that offers educational, cultural and business programs about Japan and U.S.–Japan relations to the public through its member Japan and Japan–America Societies. NAJAS is the only national non-profit network in the United States dedicated to public education about Japan. NAJAS consists of approximately 40 independent Japan-related organizations located in 32 cities around the country. Its membership includes business, political, and academic, as well as American and Japanese members, and affords a variety of perspectives on U.S.–Japan relations.

== See also ==
- Japan Society (Manhattan)
- Japan America Society of Greater Philadelphia
- Japan America Society of Houston
