= Elizabeth Brown =

Elizabeth Brown may refer to:

- Elizabeth Martha Brown (1811–1856), last woman to be hanged in public in Dorset, England
- Elizabeth Brown (astronomer) (1830–1899), English astronomer
- Elizabeth Brown (musician) (born 1953), American contemporary composer and musical performer
- Elizabeth Mills Brown (1916–2008), American architectural historian, preservationist, and civic leader
- Elizabeth Ann Brown (1918–2017), American foreign service officer
- Elizabeth A. R. Brown (1932–2024), American professor of history at Brooklyn College, City University of New York
- Elizabeth Brown (botanist) (1956–2013), New Zealand-born botanist
- Elizabeth Dorothy Wuist Brown (1880–1972), American botanist
- Elizabeth Brown Pryor (1951–2015), American diplomat and historian
- Elizabeth Brown (politician), American politician in Connecticut
- Elizabeth Brown, American politician and former member of the Columbus, Ohio City Council
- Liz Brown (politician), American politician first elected to the Indiana Senate in 2014
- Liz Brown, backing vocalist for Wheatus

== See also ==
- Elizabeth Browne (disambiguation)
- Betty Brown (disambiguation)
- Beth Brown (disambiguation)
