= Criticism of IKEA =

Global furniture and homeware retailer IKEA has been criticized for various issues, including their raw material sourcing, the size of their stores, the impact of their stores on local communities, legal violations, and unfair or discriminatory business practices, among others.

== Wood sourcing practices ==
IKEA has been involved in unsustainable and most likely illegal logging of wood in multiple Eastern European countries. In this light, the company has been accused of greenwashing by organisations such as Corporate Europe Observatory and Greenpeace.

=== Illegal timber in Ukraine ===
In 2020, the NGO Earthsight found IKEA and others to be selling furniture made from wood illegally felled during "silent periods" in the forests of the Ukrainian Carpathians. The wood in question was certified by the Forest Stewardship Council (FSC) despite its sourcing.

=== Illegal timber in Russia ===
In 2021, the NGO Earthsight alleged the use of illegally logged wood from protected forests in Russia by IKEA and others, with the source forests being owned by millionaire politician Evgeny Bakurov. Bakurov's pine was certified by the FSC. IKEA denied wrongdoing and announced a temporary ban on sanitary felled wood from Russia, while also insisting that Bakurov's wood was "legally harvested".

=== Illegal timber in Romania ===
In 2017, a team of French journalists learned IKEA was cutting down 200-year-old trees and converting them into particle board in their sub-supplier Kronospan's factory in Sebeș, Romania. Kronospan delivers particle board to Ecolor, which produces, among other things, the Brimnes shelf for IKEA. Mikhail Tarasov, IKEA's Global Forestry Manager, answered in an interview that the only thing they ask their suppliers for is using particle board in their furniture. Questions regarding where IKEA sources their furniture and wood are considered classified.

In 2022, The New Republic published a report about the misuse of logging permits in Romanian forests owned by INGKA Investments, the investment arm of IKEA owner INGKA Holding. INGKA had cleared far bigger areas of protected old-growth forest in Romania than permitted, contributing to local corruption and violence against environmental activists. Since 2015, INGKA Investments has become the largest private landowner in Romania, by buying up forest. It is estimated that around 10% of the wood used for IKEA furniture comes from Romania.

==== Scandinavica ====
In 2014, documents were found at the Securitate archives in Bucharest, Romania, which indicated that IKEA's open purchase of Romanian lumber throughout the 1980s was part of a complex scheme (codenamed "Scandinavica") to fund the Securitate and allow the accumulation of foreign currency in the Socialist Republic of Romania: the Romanian lumber company Tehnoforestexport would regularly overcharge IKEA, transfer the overpayments into private Securitate bank accounts, wait for interest to accrue, and then reimburse IKEA the principal. IKEA denied complicity in Scandinavica but began an internal investigation.

=== Timber from Belarus ===
7% of the wood that becomes IKEA furniture comes from Belarus, where the state owns all of the country's forests. IKEA has been accused of financing President of Belarus Alexander Lukashenko's repression against political opponents, with Anna Sundström, Secretary-General of the Olof Palme International Center, arguing that the money contributes to maintaining his oppressive regime.

== Child deaths ==
In July 2015, IKEA and the U.S. Consumer Product Safety Commission, through the company's Safer Homes Together advertising campaign, issued a warning in the United States, the United Kingdom, and Ireland to customers to secure the Malm chests of drawers and wardrobes firmly to the wall using free kits distributed by the company, after the deaths of two young children in the U.S. in February and June 2014 when the furniture tipped over and fell on them. Since 1989, there were three other deaths from other similar appliance models tipping over, and 14 incidents of Malm chests tipping over, resulting in four injuries. The company sent out free kits on request for customers to anchor the furniture to the wall. In June 2016, after a third toddler died in the U.S., IKEA recalled all Malm dressers as well as several similar models which posed a tipping danger if not secured to the wall with the supplied kit. On 12 July 2016, bowing to two weeks of rising pressure in China, IKEA announced that it was extending this recall to that country, which, along with Europe, was initially excluded from the recall. Over 29 million dressers were recalled. IKEA settled wrongful death lawsuits for over $50 million in compensation to the families of the three children who were killed.

== IKEA France spying ==
In 2012, IKEA in France was accused by the independent newspaper Le Canard enchaîné and the investigative website Mediapart of spying on its employees and clients by illegally accessing National Police records. The head of risk management at IKEA feared his employees were anti-globalists or potential ecoterrorists.

The French branch of IKEA went on trial on 22 March 2021, for running an elaborate system to spy on staff members and job applicants by illegally using private detectives and police officers.

On 15 June 2021, IKEA France was found guilty of spying and ordered to pay €1.1m in fines and damages for these illegal practices. Additionally, Jean-Louis Baillot, the former head of IKEA France was ordered to pay €50,000 and received a two-year suspended prison sentence. Jean-François Paris, IKEA's former head of risk management and alleged mastermind of the scheme, received a suspended 18 month prison sentence and was fined €10,000.

== Store size, construction, and openings ==
IKEA's goals of sustainability and environmental design in its merchandise have sometimes been at odds with the impact a new IKEA store can have on a community. In particular, the size of proposed IKEA stores and a perceived negative effect on other local businesses has often seen significant opposition from members of such communities. Some examples include:

- In 2004, there was controversy about an Irish law restricting the maximum size of a retail outlet to 6,000 square metres (65,000 sq ft). IKEA's plan to build a much larger store in Dublin caused the law to be put up for debate. The law was changed to remove the size limit for retail outlets selling durable goods in designated areas. The Minister for the Environment was criticized for allegedly changing the law to suit one company and other agencies protested the law change as damaging to small businesses while the government defended its decision stating that the move was a positive one for Irish consumers. IKEA Dublin has since opened on 27 July 2009.
- In September 2004, when IKEA offered a limited number of free $150 vouchers at the opening of a new store in Jeddah, Saudi Arabia, three people were crushed to death in a stampede that followed the store's opening.
- IKEA has demolished historic buildings to make room for parking lots, including part of Marcel Breuer's landmark Pirelli Tire Building in New Haven, Connecticut, and the Red Hook graving dock in Brooklyn, New York City. The College Park, Maryland store was also built over a historic tavern, and inside the store is an interactive display detailing its history.
- In 2007, about ten ancient tombs were destroyed in the construction of an IKEA store in Nanjing, China. Archaeologists from the Nanjing Museum requested the building company to halt work to retrieve artifacts, but did not receive the necessary permission.
- In June 2007, the designated nationalist Social Democratic and Labour Party in Northern Ireland complained about an artist's rendering of IKEA's Belfast store that included both the Union Flag and the Ulster Banner flag as two of the three flags in front of the store. After being labelled "an upmarket Orange hall" by the party, IKEA assured customers and co-workers that only the Swedish flag would be displayed outside the store.
- In 2008, a police investigation for corruption in Spain uncovered the director of IKEA Expansion and an entrepreneur owner of the land discussing the location of a store in Alicante, during which it was alleged the director was meeting with organized crime.

== Involvement of IKEA founder with Nazi sympathizer ==
In 1994, Stockholm daily newspaper Expressen reported on IKEA founder Ingvar Kamprad's past involvement with Swedish pro-Nazi groups as one of the member's archives revealed his name. The archives showed Kamprad had attended a number of meetings and had befriended a leading extremist, Per Engdahl, starting in 1945 and extending well into the 1950s. The newspaper printed more details, including the text of a 1950 note from Kamprad to Engdahl in which Kamprad said he was proud to be involved with the groups. Kamprad denied he was ever a formal member of the Nazi groups and said he was drawn to Engdahl's vision of a non-communist, socialist Europe. He called his activities during that time "a part of my life which I bitterly regret."

== Price discrimination ==
In 2007, Canadian newscast CityNews reported that IKEA had been charging up to twice as much in their Canadian stores as for the same items sold in their American stores, despite the Canadian dollar having temporarily reached parity with the U.S. dollar.

Within the days after the launch of the South Korean edition of the official IKEA website, complaints arose from a group of consumers on IKEA's pricing policy in the country: the prices of certain products were higher than other countries. On 24 November 2014, Jang Duck-jin, head of the Fair Trade Commission's consumer policy bureau, told the media that the commission was planning to commission a consumer group to compare IKEA's product prices by country, and on 19 March 2015, the Consumers Union of Korea published a report comparing the prices of 49 IKEA products in South Korea and other countries, which concluded that exchange rate adjusted prices in Korea were second highest out of 28 developed economies compared, and fourth highest once adjusted for purchasing power.

== Biased branding and advertising accusations ==
- Former Norwegian prime minister Kjell Magne Bondevik has criticized IKEA for not depicting women assembling furniture in its instruction booklets. IKEA denied this claim in a statement.
- In 2008, Klaus Kjøller, a researcher from the University of Copenhagen, accused IKEA of cultural imperialism, arguing that for years, IKEA has named their cheap rugs after Danish places, while the more expensive and luxurious furniture was named after Swedish places.
- In October 2012, IKEA was criticized in Sweden for airbrushing women out of pictures in catalogues used in Saudi Arabia.
- In October 2017, a Chinese IKEA commercial, showing a mother scolding her daughter for not "bringing home a boyfriend", was criticized by netizens for "sexist" and discrimination against singles and single women in China. IKEA apologized for "giving the wrong perception".
- In June 2025, Swedish Newspaper Dagens ETC published a list of 418 companies who had purchased advertising space on the ultranationalist Israeli TV channel, Channel 14. IKEA was one of 50 MNCs in the list, alongside French retail giant Carrefour and Swiss multinational food and beverage processing conglomerate Nestlé.

== Horse meat meatballs ==
In February 2013, IKEA announced it had pulled 17,000 portions of Swedish meatballs containing beef and pork from stores in Europe after testing in the Czech Republic found traces of horse meat in the product. The company removed the Swedish meatballs from store shelves on 25 February 2013, but only made the announcement public after Swedish newspaper Svenska Dagbladet uncovered what happened. In a March 2013 media report, an IKEA representative stated that the corporation had made Familjen Dafgård, its main meatball supplier, cease business with 8 of its 15 suppliers, and would reduce the number of purchasing countries. The offending meat was traced to a Polish abattoir.
