= Hotel Marcel =

Building in New Haven, Connecticut

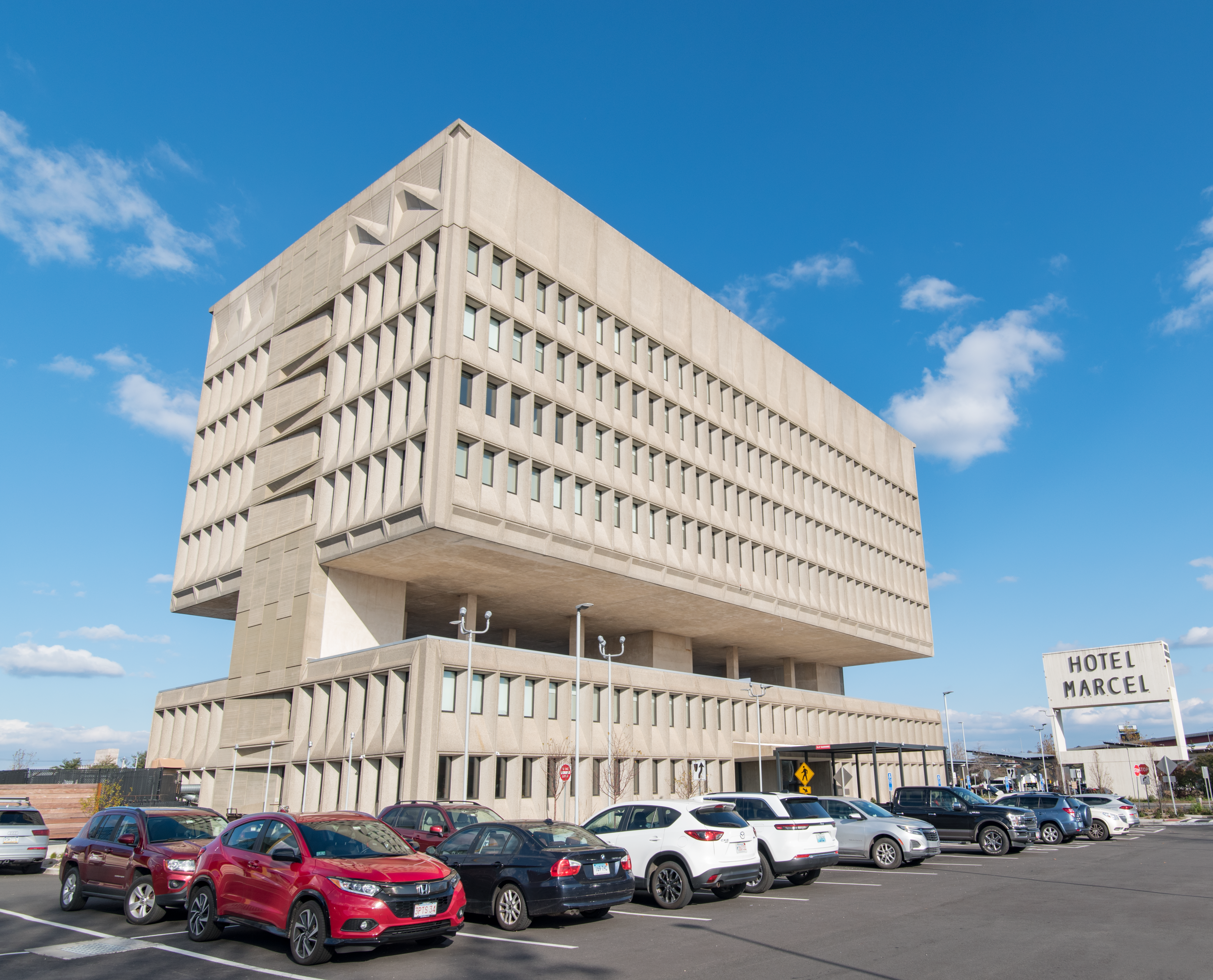
- Former names: Pirelli Tire Building; Armstrong Rubber Company Building
- Hotel chain: Tapestry Collection by Hilton

General information
- Architectural style: Brutalism
- Location: 500 Sargent Drive, New Haven, Connecticut, United States USA
- Coordinates: 41.2965°N 72.9187°W
- Construction started: 1968
- Completed: 1970
- Renovated: 2020–2022
- Cost: $6.5 million

Technical details
- Floor count: 9 (7 excluding two-story gap)
- Floor area: 107,100 sq ft (9,950 m^{2})

Design and construction
- Architects: Marcel Breuer, Robert F. Gatje
- Structural engineer: Paul Weidlinger, Matthys Levy

Other information
- Number of rooms: 165
- Parking: 130 spaces, surface lot
- Public transit: Union Station; CT Transit 274

Website
- hotelmarcel.com
- Armstrong Rubber Company Building
- U.S. National Register of Historic Places
- Location within Connecticut Location within the United States
- NRHP reference No.: 100006451
- Added to NRHP: April 29, 2021

The Hotel Marcel (formerly the Armstrong Rubber Company Building or the Pirelli Tire Building) is located in the Long Wharf district of New Haven, Connecticut, United States. The nine-story building was designed by modernist architect Marcel Breuer in the Brutalist style and originally functioned as an office headquarters for the Armstrong Rubber Company. Since 2022, it has operated as a Hilton hotel with 165 rooms. Over the years, the building has received extensive commentary from architecture critics, particularly for its massing or shape. The building is listed on the Connecticut Register of Historic Places and the National Register of Historic Places.

The Hotel Marcel's massing is composed of a two-story base, originally used for research and development, and a five-story upper section, originally used as offices. The two sections are separated by a two-story air gap with three massive piers. The facade is made of Mo-Sai concrete, with recessed windows and an entrance to the east. The base originally contained warehouses and research laboratories extending further west, although most of the extended base was demolished in 2003. The structural system is made of steel and concrete, with the upper floors suspended from a series of trusses. Inside, there is a ground-floor lobby and lounge, with hotel rooms above and an event space on the top floor. The modern hotel is a zero-energy building, relying on solar panels. The building's site includes a freestanding concrete sign to the northeast.

The Armstrong Rubber Company acquired the site in 1966 and developed its headquarters there from 1968 to 1970. Pirelli acquired Armstrong Rubber in 1988 and moved out of the building in May 1999. For the next two decades, the building was predominantly vacant, being used only for occasional events such as art exhibitions. Following an unsuccessful attempt in 1999 to build a shopping mall on the site, the building was sold to Westfield Group and then to IKEA, which demolished part of the base. The architect and developer Bruce Redman Becker bought the building in January 2020 and began converting it into a hotel that September. The hotel opened in May 2022.

== Site ==
The Hotel Marcel, originally known as the Armstrong Rubber Company Building and later as the Pirelli Tire Building, stands at 500 Sargent Drive in the Long Wharf area of New Haven, Connecticut, United States. It occupies a larger parcel bounded on the north by Sargent Drive, on the east by Sargent Drive and I-95, and on the west by Brewery Street. The site lies between the Northeast Corridor railroad tracks to the west and the Connecticut Turnpike—part of Interstate 95—and New Haven Harbor to the east. The land had been marshland until 1949, when it was filled with material from the dredging of New Haven Harbor and, later, from construction of the Connecticut Turnpike. The building was originally set within a lawn, which was replaced by parking in the 2000s. The ground-level parking lot contains approximately 130 spaces. It also includes a carport fitted with solar panels, as well as electric-vehicle charging stations.

The hotel adjoins an IKEA store, which stands directly south of the building. Farther south is a former Howard Johnson's hotel designed in a similar style. That building, completed in 1971, had become a La Quinta Inn by the 2010s. A writer for the New Haven Register described the Howard Johnson building as "a pale paean" to the Armstrong Rubber building. The surrounding area also includes parking lots and industrial buildings. Nearby landmarks include the Long Wharf Theatre and the Northeast Corridor's New Haven Union Station. The hotel provides an electric shuttle van service to and from Union Station for guests without cars.

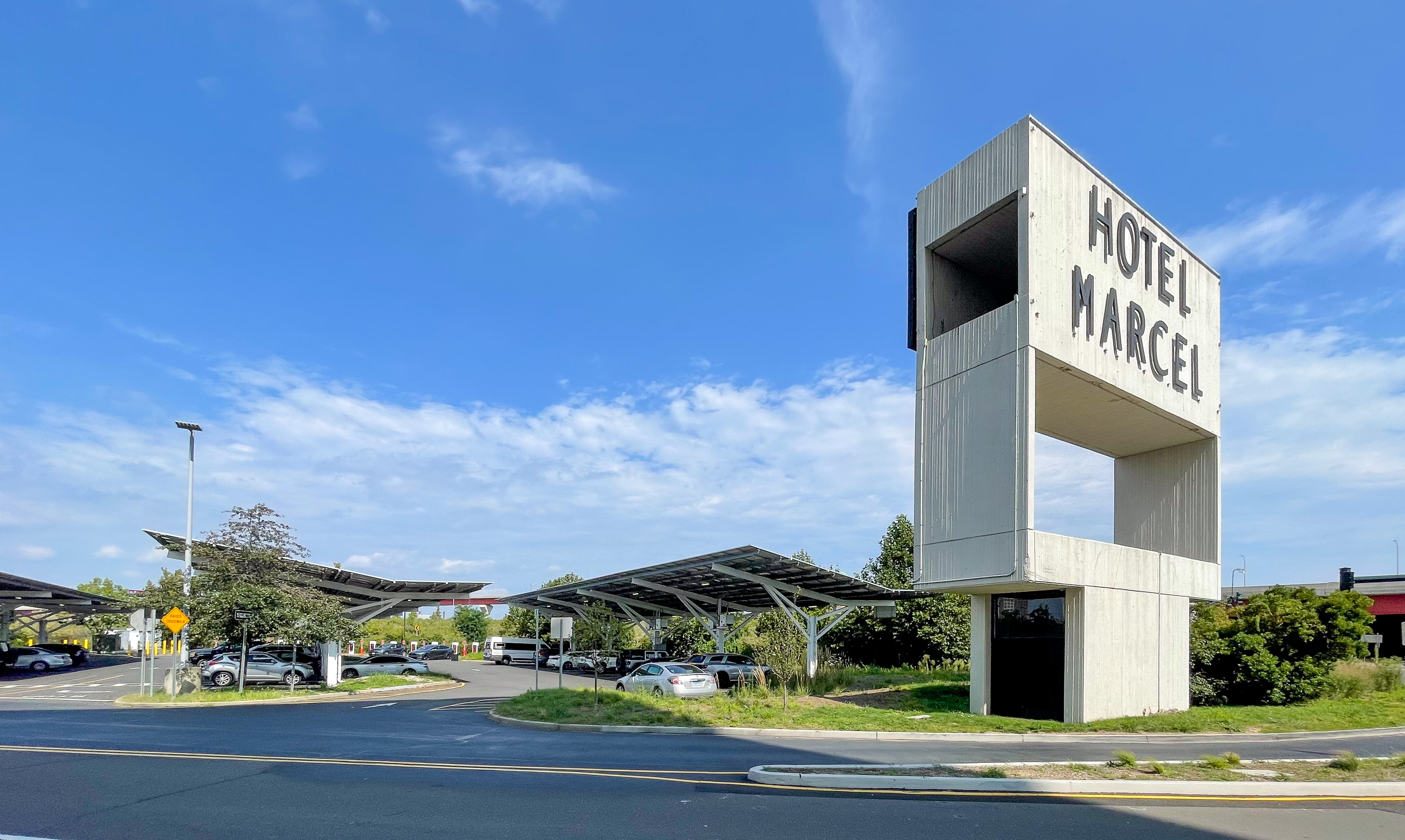
Hotel Marcel's freestanding concrete sign

At the northeastern corner of the site is a freestanding concrete sign measuring 48 feet (15 m) high and 36 feet (11 m) wide. Built at the same time as the main structure in 1968–1969, the sign is a contributing feature in the site's National Register of Historic Places listing. The building's principal architect, Marcel Breuer, designed the sign after rejecting an earlier proposal to place signage above the roof. The sign consists of a central pedestal supporting a rectangular frame made up of two narrow vertical piers flanking an open void. Above the frame is a concrete mass with square openings on its sides. The frame originally displayed the Armstrong Rubber name, and later owners altered it to show their own branding. The pedestal contains a small east-facing door and a west-facing window, providing access to storage space inside. The door was added to circumvent local height restrictions on signs; because of this feature, the city zoning code classified the structure as a building rather than a sign, exempting it from those limits. The Connecticut Historical Commission has compared the sign to a carillon that Breuer designed for the College of Saint Benedict and Saint John's University in Minnesota.

== Architecture ==
The Hotel Marcel was designed by modernist architects Marcel Breuer and Robert F. Gatje in the Brutalist style. Paul Weidlinger and his associate Matthys Levy were the structural engineers. Originally an office building, the Hotel Marcel structure was converted into a hotel from 2020 to 2022.

=== Exterior ===
==== Form ====
The Hotel Marcel's massing is composed of two sections: a two-story base and a five-story upper section. These sections are separated by a gap (also described as a negative space) measuring 17 feet (5.2 m) high. Including the gap, the building is nine stories high. The gap was originally intended to reduce noise from the research, development, and production laboratories below, allowing the administrative offices in the upper section to be quieter, The gap also visually separated the differing functions of each section, and it provided space for two additional floors if future demand necessitated them. The configuration of the massing was comparable to other mid-century modern buildings suspended above the ground level. Large piers at the building's north end, center, and south end connect the lower and upper stories; these piers contain the utilities, elevators, and stairs. The upper stories are topped by a flat roof.

The main building's upper floors have dimensions of 180 by 84 feet (55 by 26 m), (Note: One source cites the upper stories as 85 feet (26 m) wide.) with the longer dimension aligned north–south. The lower floors originally measured 180 feet north–south and 384 feet (117 m) west–east, extending west from the main building. Research and development laboratories occupied 204 feet (62 m) of the west–east length, while a warehouse spanned the remaining 180 feet (55 m). The low-rise warehouse wing was demolished in 2003, and a section of the base's research laboratories was also demolished during that time. Because the demolished sections included everything that was not directly underneath the upper stories, this gave the lower section a floor dimension of 180 by 84 feet (55 by 26 m). Seen from the side, the building has a cross-section shaped like an I-beam; before the demolition of the annexes, the cross-section was L-shaped.

==== Facade ====
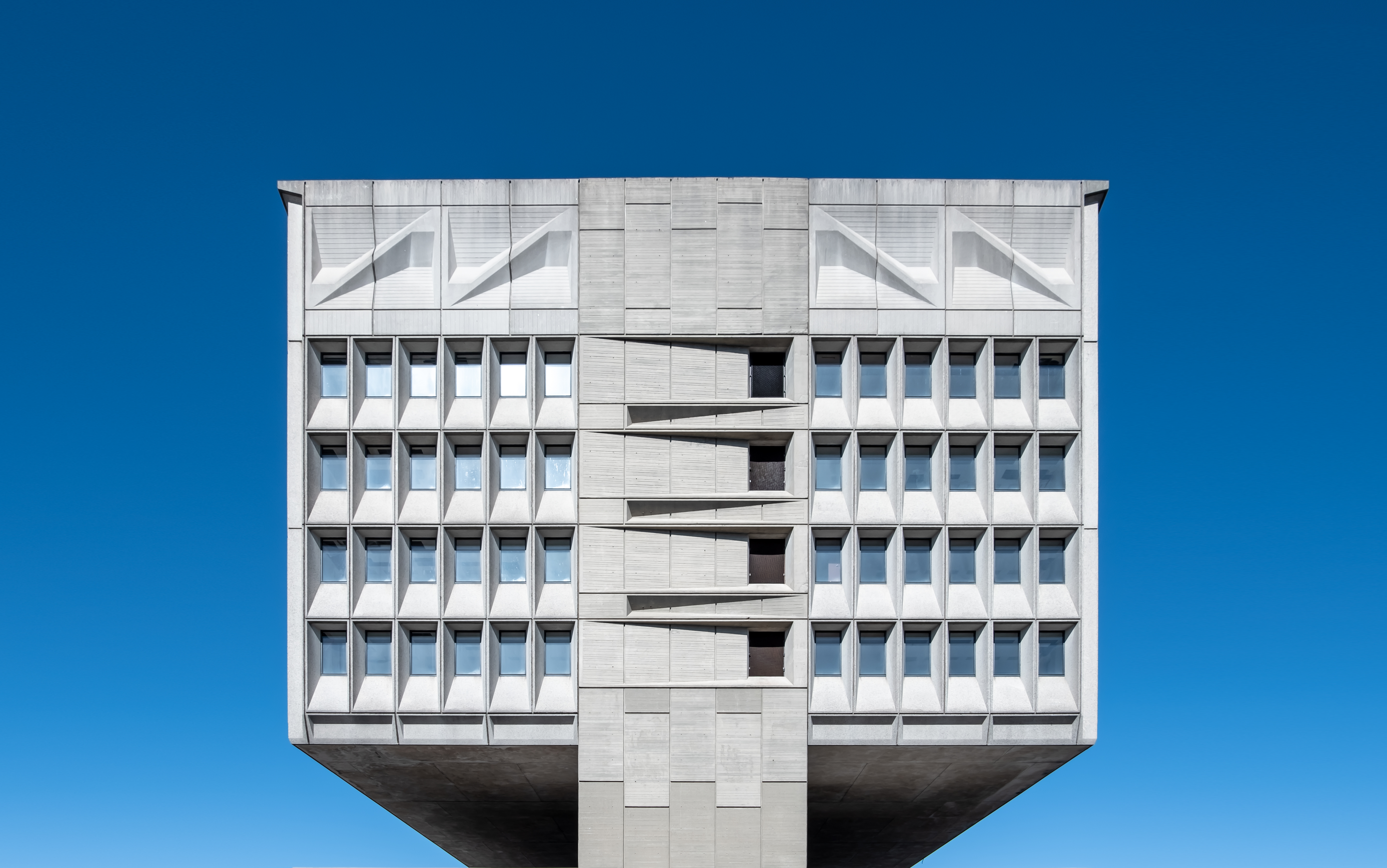
Detail of the south elevation. The central bay is wider than the others, with one recessed window on the far eastern side of each story. The spandrels between each story are beveled. Atop the building, the mechanical story's concrete panels have reliefs, which conceal diagonal trusses.

The facade's west and east elevations are divided into 36 bays, while the shorter north and south elevations are divided into 13 bays. Each of the bays is generally 5 feet (1.5 m) wide. The exception is the central bay of the north and south elevations, which is 24 feet (7.3 m) wide and is embedded into the piers supporting the building. The facade is made of concrete, like many of Breuer's other designs; during his career, he had been especially involved in using concrete as a decorative feature. The concrete panels are made of Mo-Sai mixture which has horizontal and vertical accents. There are 525 concrete panels, of which some were cast on-site during construction, while others were precast. Parts of the panels have a rougher texture than the rest of the facade, as they were poured into wooden formwork. The panels are separated by deep joints and were coated with a layer of insulation during the 2020s hotel renovation.

The facade has 525 windows, which are recessed 30 inches (760 mm) from the concrete panels and are set into immovable metal frames. Each window opening measures 3 by 6 feet (0.91 by 1.83 m) across, surrounded by beveled concrete on all four sides. The bevels shield occupants from excessive sunlight and create a visual impression of depth, casting shadows of different shapes throughout the day. During the hotel conversion, the original windows were replaced with triple-glazed panes to reduce indoor temperature fluctuations and to block highway noise.

The main entrance is located within the eight center bays of the eastern elevation. The entryway has granite floor tiles, a protruding concrete canopy, and a soffit or ceiling made of cement plaster. It contains a central vestibule with angled concrete walls, which converge at a pair of double doors topped by a transom window; this vestibule is flanked by recessed windows. On the north and south elevations, the central bay has one recessed window at the far eastern end of each story, alternating with beveled spandrel panels between the different stories. In the space between the upper and lower stories, the central bay is clad with rough-textured concrete panels, which are staggered vertically. A stair from the north, and a ramp from the south, lead to additional utility doors on these elevations. The remainder of the piers are clad in cast concrete.

The double-height mechanical space on the ninth story is windowless, with concrete panels measuring two bays wide. The mechanical story's panels have reliefs, some of which conceal the building's trusswork. The panels on the west and east elevations are beveled at their bottoms and tops. On the north and south elevations, the trusswork cuts diagonally across the beveled panels. The demolished portion of the research laboratories had been clad in the same material as the main building. The warehouse portion had contained 10-foot-wide (3.0 m) precast-concrete panels, with a central window and beveled edges at the top and bottom of each panel.

=== Structural and mechanical features ===
The foundation is composed of 758 deep pilings, since the building is constructed on former mudflats. The structural system of the main building consists of corrugated metal ceilings, concrete floors and walls, and steel I-beam columns. At ground level, the cast-concrete floor is embedded into the foundation. These structural systems were also used in the research-laboratory portion of the demolished annex, while the warehouse portion had column-free spaces covered by precast concrete roof beams. The building was one of the first in the U.S. to have floor plates suspended from overhead cantilevered trusses. Each of the upper floors is supported by seven 50-short-ton (45-long-ton; 45 t) trusses. The exterior curtain wall is also suspended from the trusses. In addition to the three large piers connecting the building's lower and upper sections, there are two parallel sets of recessed columns between these piers.

As built, the structure has a compact massing and a thick facade, making it easier to regulate indoor temperatures. The Hotel Marcel has operated as a zero-energy building since its renovation; its heating, ventilation, and air conditioning (HVAC) systems, hot water, and lighting systems all use solar energy. There are over 1,000 solar panels covering its parking lot and hotel roof. (Note: One source gives a figure of 1,100 solar panels.) In 2024, the panels were estimated to generate 575,000 kilowatt-hours (2,070,000 MJ) per year. The hotel also has a battery energy storage system with a capacity of 1.5 megawatts (2,000 hp), which is used if the solar panels cannot provide sufficient energy. The building is not connected to the local gas-supply system, but it does have an electrical connection, allowing the hotel to supply excess electricity to the power grid. A Power over Ethernet system is used for artificial lighting fixtures. The building also has all-electric machinery in its laundry and kitchens, and there are separate variable refrigerant flow systems for the hotel's hot-water and HVAC systems.

=== Interior ===
The building was constructed as the headquarters for Armstrong Rubber Company. The building originally had 183,000 square feet (17,000 m^{2}); excluding demolished portions, the surviving structure is estimated at 107,100 sq ft (9,950 m^{2}). The lowest two stories contained laboratories and were used for research and development, and the demolished section of the building was used as a warehouse and production facility. Three sides of the base were taken up by research laboratories, while tire-testing labs with high ceilings were located in the warehouse. Originally, the upper section was used as offices. In general, the interiors of both the main building and its demolished annex are arranged on a grid of square modules measuring 30 feet (9.1 m) on each side. The main building is divided into six north–south and three west–east modules; the center bay of the west–east dimension is only 24 feet (7.3 m) wide, corresponding to the piers' width. The modules are further divided into sections measuring 5 feet (1.5 m) wide, corresponding with the facade's bays.

The central pier has elevators, accessed by elevator lobbies with granite floors. The main stairs are located within the piers at the building's north and south ends. The staircases connect all of the building's floors, and the northern staircase extends to the roof. The stairs have concrete stringer boards and walls, terrazzo steps, and wooden handrails. The stairs are similar to a set that Breuer had designed for the Whitney Museum's building at 945 Madison Avenue. The landings of each stair have terrazzo floors, concrete walls, and metal louvers beneath the windows in the landings. After the hotel's completion, the elevators were retrofitted with regenerative braking equipment.

Many of the original decorative finishes were removed in the 2000s. As part of the hotel's development, the interior was redesigned by Dutch East Design, which added hotel rooms, a restaurant, a bar, and an event space. The hotel's art collection, selected by the hotel's co-owner Kraemer Sims Becker, predominantly includes works by women. The materials and decorative materials used inside the hotel were intended to contrast with the Brutalist concrete facade.

==== Lobby floor ====
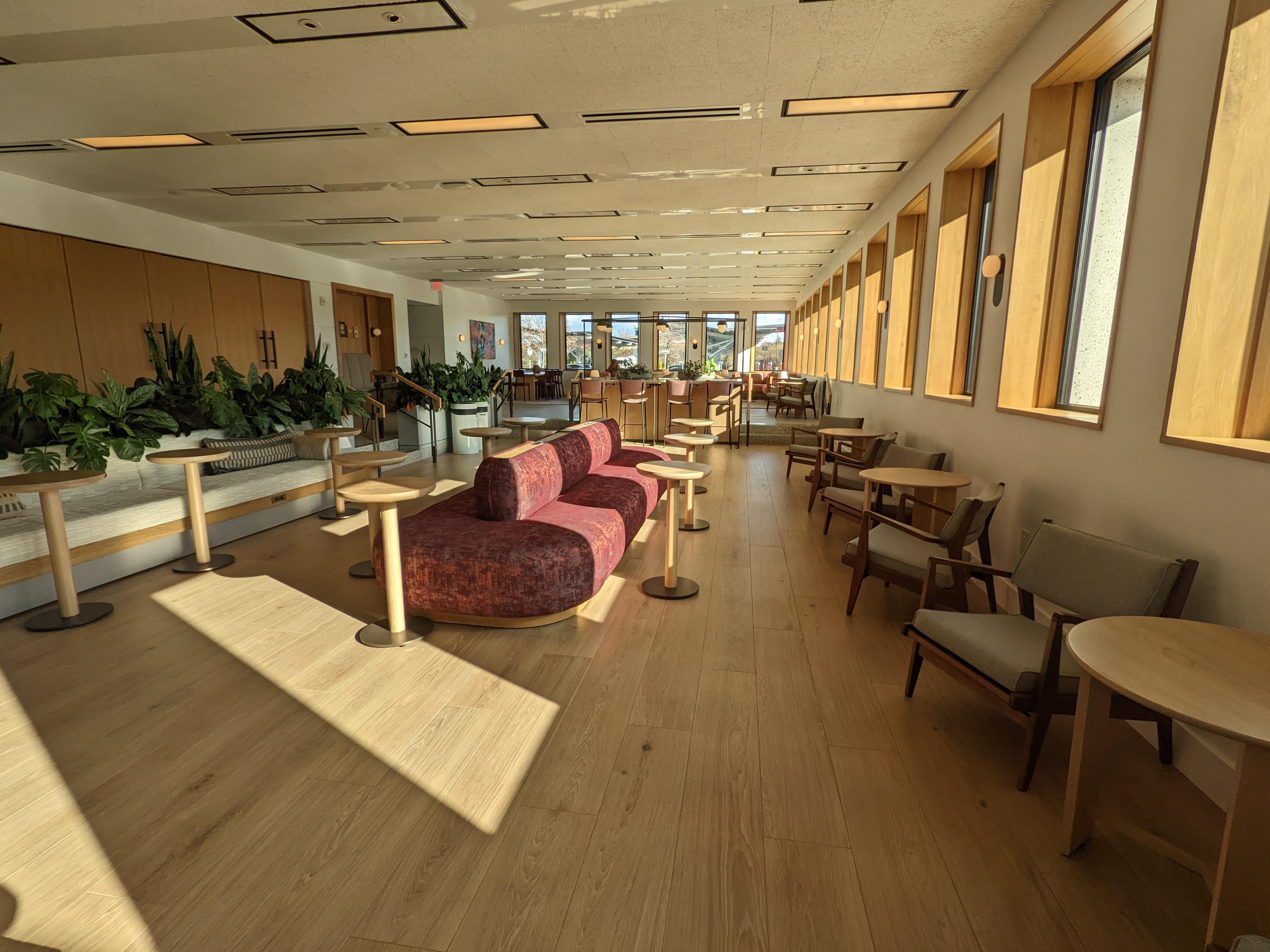
Interior of the lobby

The lobby is partly below ground level and is decorated in earth tones. The floor is covered in granite tiles, and there is a staircase with 15-foot-wide (4.6 m) granite steps. When the Hotel Marcel was used as an office building, the lobby had a mural of a highway. A terracotta panel in the lobby, a reference to the detailing on the concrete facade, was added during the hotel conversion. The lobby ceiling consists of interconnecting tiles, with lights concealed behind acrylic panels; the arrangement of the tiles and panels allowed the ducts and wires above the ceiling to be accessed more easily. The placement of the lights dates from the original construction, while the ceiling's design dates from the hotel renovation.

One of its original pieces of furniture remains intact: a polished granite reception desk, moved across the hall into a vestibule near an event space. Dutch East designed other furnishings, including lighting, carpets, and furniture. The main reception desk is made of wood. The lobby lounge is depressed below the rest of the lobby. The lounge occupies a preexisting pit at the ground floor's northern end, which originally accommodated computers. The ground floor also contains the BLDG restaurant, which specializes in American cuisine.

==== Other stories ====
Before the hotel renovation, the outer portions of each story had individual offices. The inner portions were used as conference and meeting spaces, and they also contained open plan work areas for assistants. The modern-day building includes 165 guest rooms, placed within the second and the fifth to eighth floors. The hotel rooms have a subdued color scheme consisting of contrasting grays and walnut wood. The walls are made of off-white vinyl panels interspersed with lighting and dark-green or sienna wood decorations. They feature Cesca chairs designed by Marcel Breuer, as well as custom modular furniture for storage designed by Dutch East. The furniture by Dutch East, designed with Bauhaus motifs, interlocks with each other and was largely manufactured in the surrounding region. The rooms also contain tables made of cast concrete. Many of these feature couches, kitchenettes, and soaking tubs. The east-facing rooms look out over New Haven Harbor, while the west-facing rooms look out over Downtown New Haven. All except 14 of the guestrooms abut the facade and have automated shades installed over their windows.

The eighth floor originally contained the executive office suite, with nine offices used by Armstrong Rubber Company officials. Prior to the hotel's renovation, the executive offices had twine or wooden panels on their walls, and the executive suite had a cafeteria and kitchen, with differing wall and floor tiles from the rest of that story. Breuer designed furniture such as a hexagonal boardroom table for the executive suite. Closets and restrooms separated the office of Armstrong Rubber's president, along the southern facade, from the other rooms on that floor. The former executive offices were converted into the hotel's largest guestrooms. These units are decorated in a mid-century modern style, with gray and blue furnishings. The wood paneling in the executive offices is retained in the modern eighth-story guestrooms.

The ninth, or top, floor of the building is a high, windowless space originally devoted to mechanical equipment. The hotel renovation modified much of the space, converting it into an event area with exposed trusses and a ceiling measuring 16 feet (4.9 m) high. (Note: Another source gives a ceiling height of 15 feet (4.6 m).) The event space spans 7,000 square feet (650 m^{2}) or 9,000 square feet (840 m^{2}). The trusses atop the building are visible from inside the ninth floor. Mechanical equipment for the hotel is also placed on the ninth floor, taking up a fraction of the space occupied by the original equipment. During the hotel's renovation, part of the roof was removed to create an open-air courtyard within the event space. A lightwell is cut into this courtyard, allowing sunlight to reach the intermediate floors. The lightwell illuminates the 14 interior guestrooms, which have windows facing it.

== History ==
=== Development ===
The building was constructed as the headquarters of the Armstrong Rubber Company, a family business based in West Haven, Connecticut. The company became a major supplier of tires for the Sears and Roebuck chain and was among the world's largest tire manufacturers by the 1960s. Under the tenure of its vice president Joseph R. Armstrong, the company sought to expand.

==== Design ====
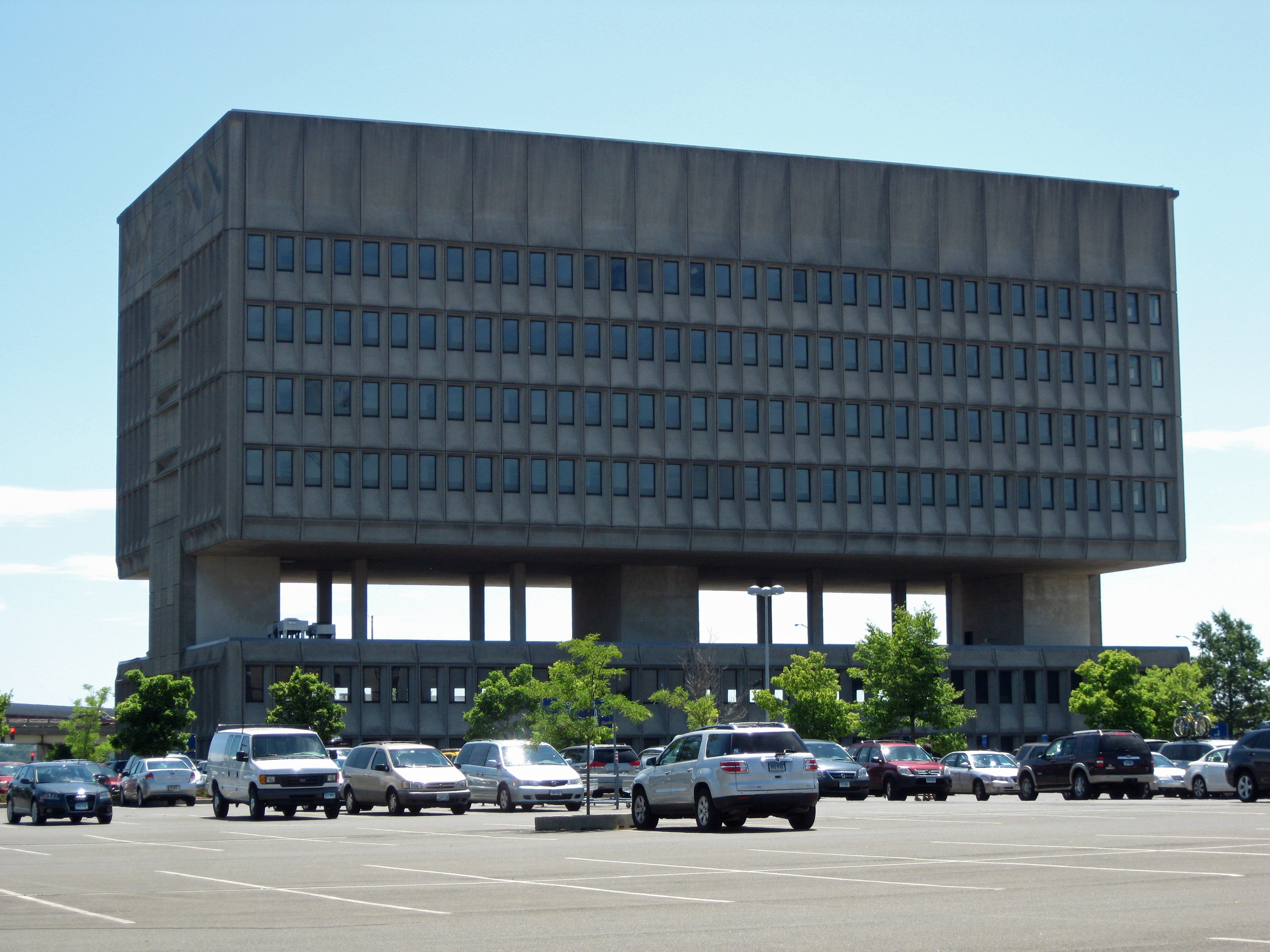
Southeast-facing view showing air gap and columns under the building's upper stories

The site of the Armstrong Rubber Company Building was originally reserved for Marlin Firearms as part of the development of New Haven's Long Wharf district. Marlin Firearms rejected the site because it was too small for the company's future development, instead deciding to build elsewhere. Armstrong Rubber announced plans to move its corporate offices to Long Wharf in June 1966. That year, Armstrong Rubber presented plans to New Haven Mayor Richard C. Lee for a building overlooking the interchange between Interstate 91 and Interstate 95. Lee allowed the purchase on the condition that a world-renowned architect be hired. Lee's preference of architect had come about because the site was highly visible from the nearby highway, and Lee wanted New Haven to become "America's model city".

Armstrong Rubber hired the Hungarian-American architect Marcel Breuer after a year-long search. Breuer was selected because his design for the Robert C. Weaver Federal Building had been completed on time and under budget, and the architect had also recently completed the UNESCO Headquarters and 945 Madison Avenue. Initially, Armstrong wanted a low-rise building to house its research and development department and its offices. The office section, near the highway, would have risen two or three stories, while the research and development wing behind it would have been shorter. Lee rejected Armstrong's low-rise proposal because only the massive roof would be visible to drivers on the highway, given the site's depressed position. Instead, he suggested that the building be between eight and ten stories high; according to Breuer's associate Robert F. Gatje, Lee had initially wanted an even taller building with 18 stories.

Breuer drew up plans for a two-story research and development space and a five-story office section with a mechanical penthouse, separated by a double-height air gap. The upper stories would have been square. The air gap not only raised the office stories, allowing them to face New Haven Harbor directly, but also attracted notice because the feature was so uncommon. Preliminary designs were completed in August 1967. At Armstrong's insistence, Breuer removed one of the office stories from the plans. The final plans called for a two-story base with the offices suspended above it; by Breuer's estimate, the suspended upper section increased costs by five to ten percent. The plans also called for a poured and precast concrete facade, which was to vary in appearance depending on the sun's position in the sky.

==== Construction ====
The Dwight Building Company was hired in January 1968 to construct the building, beating out six other bidders. The building was largely constructed with a steel frame, except for a portion of the building that was constructed with long ceiling beams made of concrete. The concrete facade was made of white cement, which was sandblasted to expose the dark aggregate within.

During the building's construction, Armstrong Rubber's board of directors asked Breuer to design signage for the building's roof, but Breuer refused the request, saying it would detract from the building's shape. As an alternative, Breuer designed a freestanding sign elsewhere on the property, and he added a door to the sign to circumvent height restrictions that applied to signs in the area. The Armstrong Rubber Building was completed in May 1970; the building's final cost was variously cited at $6.5 million (Note: Equivalent to $42 million in 2025) or $7 million. (Note: Equivalent to $45 million in 2025) It was the second-most-expensive building completed in Connecticut that year, after the American Can Company headquarters building in Greenwich, which had cost $30 million. (Note: Equivalent to $192 million in 2025) The building originally covered a 19-acre (7.7 ha) site.

=== Offices and research use ===
The Armstrong Rubber Building was initially planned to host 500 employees, out of the company's total staff of 5,000. Armstrong Rubber owned the building for 18 years. During that time, the 1970s recession and the resultant energy crisis caused Armstrong Rubber's business to decline, resulting in the closure of one facility in 1980. (Note: The National Park Service writes that Armstrong had moved out of its headquarters and fired 600 employees in 1980, but contemporary sources indicate that this refers to a different facility in West Haven, Connecticut.) The building remained Armstrong Rubber's headquarters through the mid-1980s, and the building's parking lot began hosting an automotive show in 1984.

Armstrong Rubber was restructured in 1987, becoming Armtek, which sold its tire business to the Italian tire manufacturer Pirelli in 1988. The purchase initially included four of Armtek's manufacturing facilities across the US. The New Haven offices, and a fifth manufacturing plant in Arkansas, were added to the transaction that May. Pirelli finalized its acquisition of Armtek's tire business in June 1988, at which point 300 Armtek employees worked at the building. Following the acquisition, the Armstrong Rubber Building became the Pirelli Tire Building. By 1992, Pirelli had employed 300 research and development staff there, although one-sixth of the staff were laid off that year. During the decade, Pirelli downsized its operations at the building.

Pirelli occupied only four of the office floors by 1996, when the structure was placed for sale. Two real-estate firms, Fusco Corporation and New England Development, began devising plans that year for a shopping mall at Long Wharf, which would replace the Pirelli Tire Building and several neighboring structures. As such, they negotiated with Pirelli and the other buildings' owners to acquire their properties. When preservationists expressed opposition to the Pirelli Tire Building's demolition, the developers modified their plans, proposing that the building be used as offices and a United States Postal Service facility. By March 1999, Fusco Corporation and New England Development had identified four anchor tenants for their proposed shopping mall, known as the Galleria. The developers had agreed not to demolish the Pirelli Tire Building, which would instead have been redeveloped as office space. Pirelli vacated the building in May 1999, though the company wished to remain headquartered in New Haven.

=== Abandonment and disuse ===
For two decades, the Pirelli Tire Building was unoccupied and largely unused as various plans were suggested for the site. The lack of use was criticized by preservation groups as encouraging demolition by neglect. A vandal broke into the building in 1999, stealing $50 (Note: Equivalent to $97 in 2025) in copper piping and causing thousands of dollars in damage.

==== Sale and mall plans ====
Pirelli sold the site in June 1999 to Fusco Corporation and New England Development, which planned to have Nordstrom as one of the anchors. New Haven's Board of Aldermen approved the proposal in August 1999, and the developers signed an agreement with the city government that October. A competing mall company, Westfield Group, heavily opposed the plans, filing multiple lawsuits. The New Haven Register wrote that Westfield had spent $1 million fighting the project, (Note: Equivalent to $1.8 million in 2025) and at least a dozen lawsuits over the mall had been filed by mid-2000.

The mall was ultimately canceled c. 2000, in part because of the lawsuits and in part because Nordstrom had withdrawn from the project after reorganizing its business. Westfield America purchased the site in March 2001 for $20 million. (Note: Equivalent to $34.7 million in 2025) Westfield began renovating the building that December, with the intent of leasing the building to biotechnology companies. The Pirelli site and an adjacent plot of land were designated as part of a Planned Development District in 2002, allowing the site to be redeveloped or adaptively reused. Although the New Haven Independent newspaper reported on rumors that the Pirelli Tire Building was to be redeveloped, nothing had been formally announced. By 2002, the New Haven city government owned the property. That year, the building hosted hundreds of artists as part of the annual "City-Wide Open Studios" event.

==== IKEA acquisition and partial demolition ====
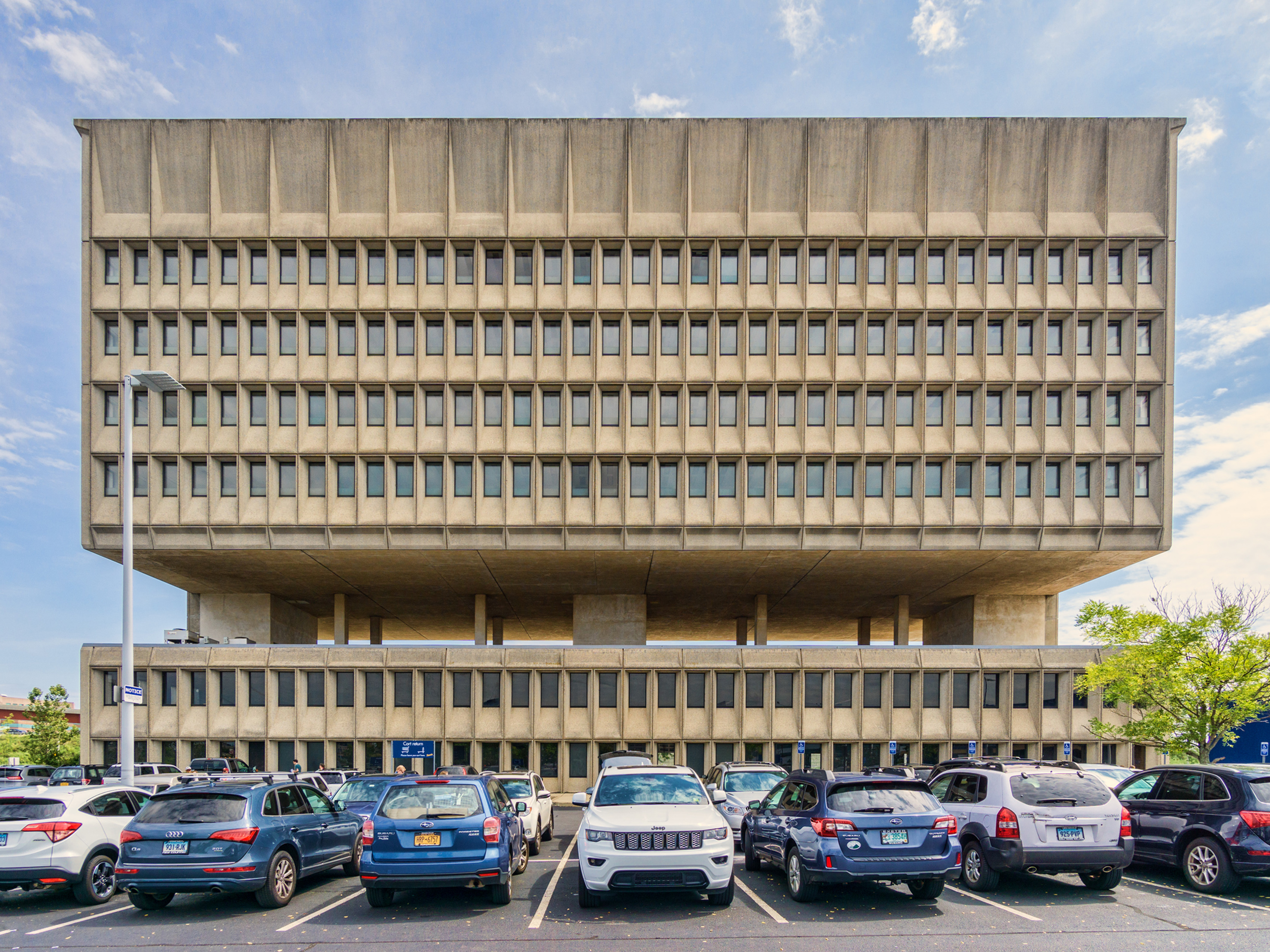
The western portion of the base was demolished in 2003 and replaced with parking.

The furniture manufacturer IKEA expressed interest in buying the building's site in mid-2002, with plans to build a store there. IKEA signed a letter of intent for the site that June; initially, IKEA wanted to demolish the entire Pirelli Tire Building and replace it with parking. After Mayor John DeStefano Jr. advocated vigorously against razing the building, IKEA revised its plans to preserve the nine-story portion of the building. The modified plans entailed demolishing two low-rise sections. New Haven's board of aldermen approved a zoning change for the plot in November 2002, allowing IKEA's plans to proceed. IKEA planned to use the remaining section of the building to advertise the new store. The company purchased the site in early 2003 but did not publicly disclose its plans for the Pirelli Tire Building's remaining section.

Although preservationists and city officials did not object to the IKEA store's development, they opposed the plans for the building's partial demolition. The revised plan was criticized by the Long Wharf Advocacy Group, a local coalition that sought to pursue alternatives for the site, along with the Connecticut chapter of the American Institute of Architects. This opposition prompted efforts to designate the building as a state landmark; this designation was successful but had no legal effect. Despite community criticism, IKEA demolished most of the low-rise portion in April 2003 for construction of a parking lot, except the portion under the offices. The demolition, one of several teardowns of major Brutalist structures in New England during the early 21st century, was criticized for disrupting the intended asymmetrical visual balance of the structure. Work on the store commenced that September, by which IKEA was considering moving its offices into the Pirelli Tire Building. As part of the store's construction, the lawns around the building were removed. IKEA's adjacent store opened in July 2004, with an entrance directly facing the Pirelli Tire Building.

==== Mid-2000s and 2010s ====
Because IKEA faced no penalties for not repairing the Pirelli Tire Building, the structure remained unused and dilapidated. The company hung massive billboard-like advertisements for IKEA products or local events, in what The Architect's Newspaper described as an additional "ignominy" to the partially-demolished building. The building had padlocked doors and boarded-up windows, and rain seeped through cracks in the windows. Although the lower stories had undergone some cleanup, including the removal of toxic materials such as asbestos and polychlorinated biphenyl, the upper stories remained uninhabitable. The building's abandonment and partial demolition contrasted with the restoration of the nearby Rudolph Hall at Yale University, built at nearly the same time. An IKEA spokesperson said in 2011 that the company was amenable to proposals for the building but that no such plans had been suggested. Constructs magazine, conversely, wrote that IKEA had rejected numerous reuse proposals for fear that a prospective tenant would cause business at IKEA's store to decline. The United States Marine Corps and several police departments from Connecticut used the building for a counterterrorism drill in 2007, breaking many of the remaining ceilings, doors, and walls.

In early 2016, the New Haven government requested $935,000 in state funding for a study into the potential redevelopment of the Long Wharf district. The city government indicated that $110,000 of this request would be used to study potential uses for the Pirelli Tire Building, including finding a site developer. Later that year, Emma Fernberger of the Bortolami contemporary-art gallery in New York City expressed interest in using the building's lower stories, and the gallery cold-called IKEA, which agreed to rent out the building. Bortolami received a one-year lease, paying a nominal fee of $1, and turned over the space to Tom Burr, one of its visual artists. Burr used the entire first floor for a conceptual art exhibition titled Body/Building, which opened in 2017 and lasted a year. Burr's exhibition was open only by appointment, and railings were installed to cordon off spaces that had been deemed unsafe for occupancy.

Tentative plans were announced in April 2018 for a hotel development at the site, possibly to be led by IKEA. The retailer's initial plans, entailed converting the interior to 165 hotel rooms, retaining the facade's design, and re-landscaping the parking lot around it. IKEA submitted these plans to New Haven's City Plan Commission in September, anticipating that it would find an operator for the hotel afterward. The plans were then modified to address concerns over parking and drainage. Following disputes over who had the authority to review the plans, the proposal was approved that November, and IKEA began seeking an operator for the property. IKEA negotiated for a year with Connecticut architect and developer Bruce Redman Becker, who planned to adaptively reuse the existing building while retaining its general design. Becker had admired the Pirelli Tire Building while studying at the Yale School of Architecture several decades earlier, and he said, "I really like it as a work of architecture with a capital A."

=== Hotel conversion ===
==== Renovation ====
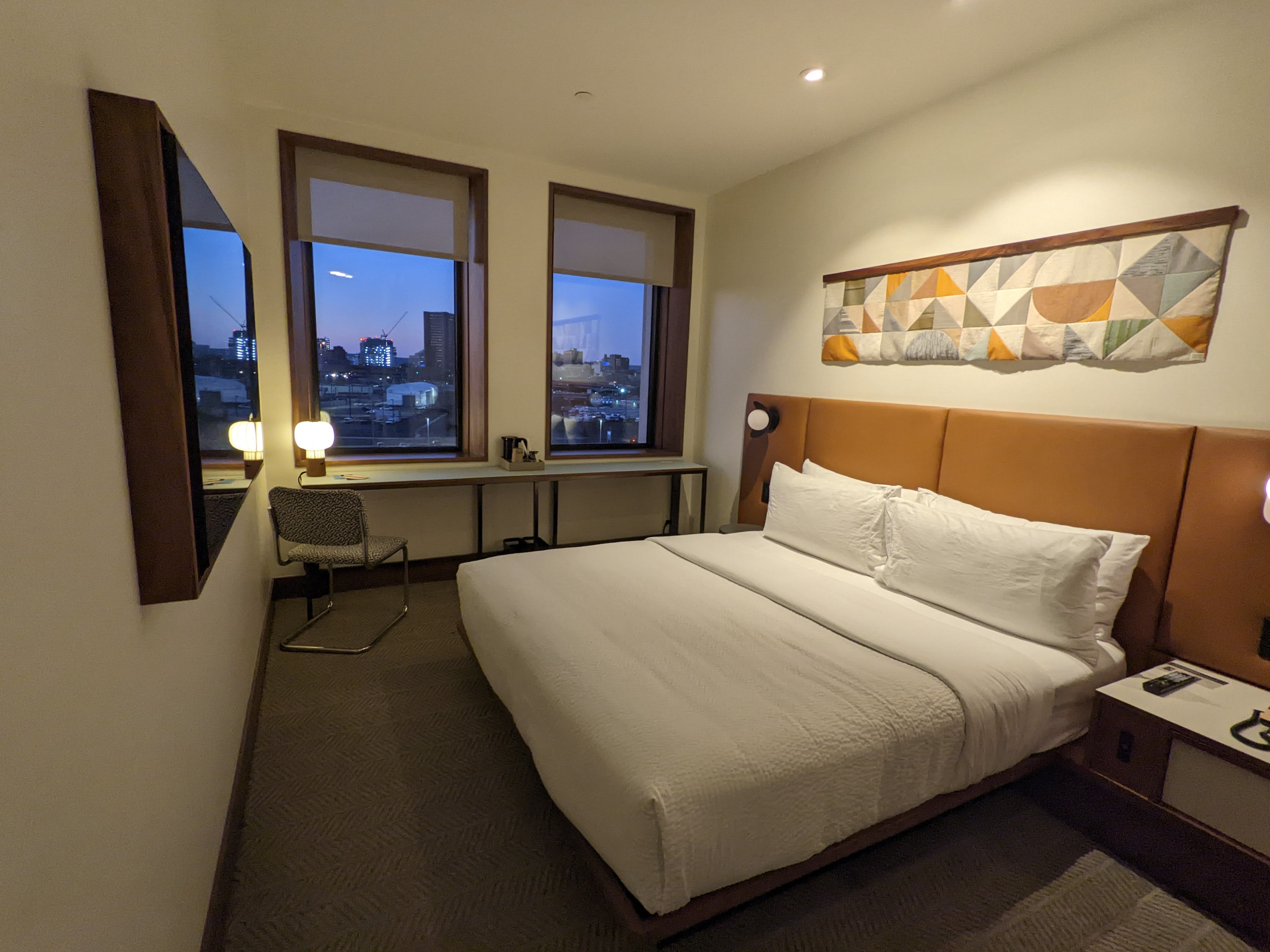
A guestroom in the hotel

On December 31, 2019, Becker bought the building and surrounding property from IKEA for $1.2 million. In exchange, Becker agreed to buy furniture from IKEA, remove the remaining asbestos, and conform to several other standards set by IKEA. The company had been sufficiently encouraged by Becker's plans, having rejected several previous offers for the property. Becker's firm, Becker + Becker, announced plans to convert the building into a carbon-neutral hotel, which would be able to rely entirely on energy that it generated on its own. The building was planned to be the first Passive House-certified hotel in the US, and the renovation team also sought LEED Platinum green building certification. The renovation, inspired by similar energy-efficient hotels in other countries, was intended to reduce the hotel's energy use to one-fifth that of comparable US hotels. Becker + Becker hired Violette de La Selle as the site's project manager and Dutch East Design for the interior design and hotel branding.

By mid-2020, workers were removing toxic materials from the building. Work on the hotel conversion commenced that September, amid the COVID-19 pandemic in Connecticut. The hotel renovation included few exterior changes, save for new windows and power-washing the concrete. The work instead focused on modernizing the interiors and adding energy-efficient features including solar panels, a battery system, and all-electric mechanical equipment. The interior was mostly rebuilt, as it had previously been uninhabitable. Because the building had been added to the National Register of Historic Places in 2021, the National Park Service (NPS) had to review the renovation. Samples of design elements, such as windows, were sent to the NPS offices in Washington, D.C., for review.

The hotel was marketed as a carbon-neutral project, although many of the green-building features used in the renovation (including mechanical systems, windows, and finishes) involved large amounts of embodied emissions, which were generated during their manufacturing process. The green-building features also increased construction costs by $5 per square foot ($54/m^{2}), compared with similar buildings, but the project was planned to save enough energy to recover these costs within five years. Becker obtained funding to offset some of the costs of the energy-efficiency upgrades, including $14 million in tax credits from the state and federal governments. Liberty Bank lent another $25 million for construction. The project cost $54 million in total, $3 million less than a renovation of a similarly-sized non-energy-efficient building would have cost.

==== Operation ====
The building reopened as the 165-room Hotel Marcel on May 16, 2022; the name referenced the building's primary architect. The upper-level spaces were not complete until several weeks after the hotel's opening. The Hotel Marcel is managed by Charlestowne Hotels and is part of Hilton's Tapestry brand. In addition to its green-building design features, the hotel relied exclusively on solar energy, promoting itself as a "fossil fuel-free hotel". The hotel also implemented several policies to reduce waste, including obtaining food supplies from local sources, eliminating table linens, composting leftover food, using only recyclable or reusable products, and washing towels only on demand. CT Insider wrote that the building still retained "much of Breuer's design aesthetic", including Bauhaus chairs and fabrics alongside European train station clocks.

== Impact ==
=== Reception ===
==== Architectural commentary ====
When the Armstrong Rubber Company Building opened, it was called "an icon of modern architecture" in ArchitectureWeek magazine. The historian Elizabeth Mills Brown wrote in a 1976 guidebook of New Haven buildings that the massing "was designed to create an instantly striking image of light and shadow when seen from a speeding car". Robert Nieminen of Buildings magazine wrote that the air gap gave the impression that the upper stories were floating, and The Telegraph wrote that the building was "recognisable for the top-heavy look" created by the gap. The Architectural Record wrote that the design had been "formally distorted for symbolic effect", being akin to what the architects Robert Venturi and Denise Scott Brown referred to as "ducks". The Plan magazine described the building's shape as having served as a landmark from the outset, and Wallpaper magazine said the shape epitomized "Breuer's approach to separation of function". The Connecticut Historical Commission wrote that the gap gave the building the impression that it was "bridging the highway", thereby connecting New Haven and the waterfront.

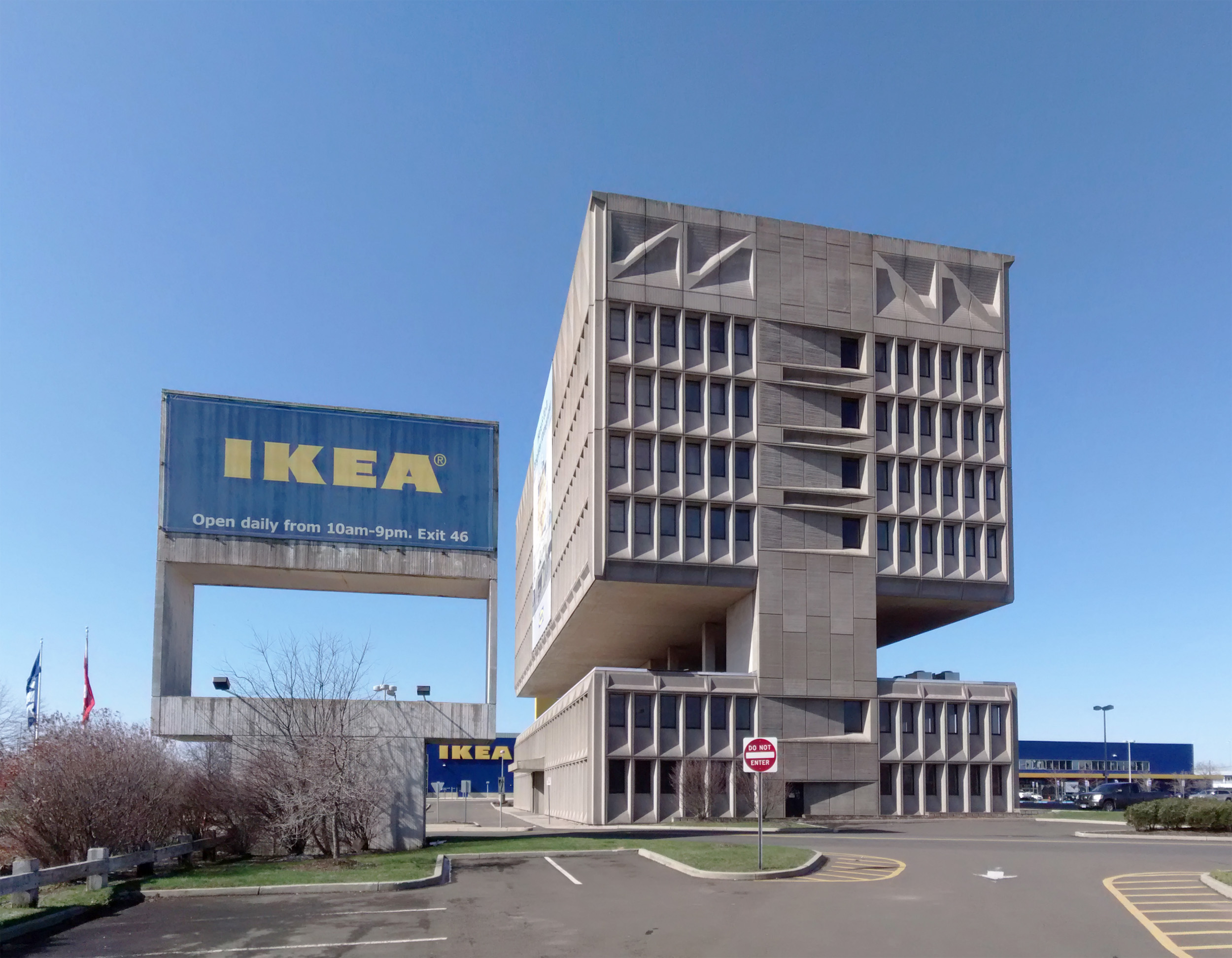
Under IKEA ownership in 2014

The Connecticut chapter of the American Institute of Architects and the preservation group Docomomo viewed the building favorably when its redevelopment was proposed in the 2000s. After the neighboring IKEA store was developed, The Financial Times and the Architectural Record wrote that the structure's placement next to IKEA was "incongruous", and Dwell magazine said of IKEA's parking-lot plans: "Is it really so important to be able to park near the latest in mass-designed Swedish decor?" The New Haven Register called it an "empty white elephant with little hope of 'logical reuse'" in 2009, and another writer for the same newspaper wrote in 2011 that the "once proud and even sexily zesty building responding to high-speed traffic has become a symbol of sad uselessness". The Hartford Courant wrote in 2016 that "this architectural statement was the full expression of New Haven's mid-century full-on embrace of urban renewal". After the hotel plans were announced, Inga Saffron of the Philadelphia Inquirer said the plans signified a resurgence in popularity for brutalism.

When the building reopened as a hotel, the Record-Journal called it "an architectural symbol of its time". Metropolis magazine contrasted the building's energy-efficient features with the unsustainable context of the original construction, including its location near a highway interchange, its use of concrete, and its original tenant's involvement in the automotive industry. The Financial Times placed the Hotel Marcel on its list of "Architecture to See in 2023", as a striking Brutalist landmark and a successful renovation following the then-recent renovation of 945 Madison Avenue for the Frick Collection. Yale Architecture School dean Deborah Berke said in 2025: "Anyone who lives on the Eastern Seaboard and has driven up I-95 knows the Armstrong Rubber Company building."

==== Hotel and public commentary ====
After the hotel opened, the Michelin Guide wrote that its opening showed that "Brutalism is back in style", with a distinctive interior that honored the original design rather than copying it outright. Condé Nast Traveler labeled it as New England's fourth-best hotel in 2025. The next year, a writer for The Digest magazine wrote that "The building grabs you. But what’s actually powering it is equally as important."

The Armstrong Rubber Company Building was more controversial among the public. A Business Insider survey of Connecticut residents in 2018 had ranked the building as the state's ugliest. (Note: For the poll itself, see: Garfield, Leanna (October 12, 2018). "The ugliest building in every US state, according to people who live there". Business Insider. Archived from the original on February 9, 2019.) After the hotel was completed, Yale architecture professor Violette De La Selle said, "Out there in the world, this is either the best or the worst building in Connecticut." The Connecticut Historical Commission's report on the building stated that the building had been completed just as the public was turning away from modernist buildings, and that the Armstrong Rubber Building had been overshadowed by 945 Madison Avenue as Breuer's best major building.

=== Awards and landmark designations ===
When plans for a mall on the site began to take traction, the possibility of the demolition of the Pirelli Tire Building led to efforts to list the site on the Connecticut Register of Historic Places. It was listed on the state register in 1997, (Note: The state register listing is cited in one source as having occurred in 2000.) following efforts by city officials, preservationists, and the New Haven Arts Council's Alliance for Architecture. The state register listing did not legally prevent the structure from being demolished. The Hotel Marcel building was additionally listed on the National Register of Historic Places in 2021. As a result of these designations, the hotel renovation required review from both state and federal preservation officials, and the renovation was eligible for tax credits.

After the hotel conversion was completed, the building received a LEED Platinum green building certification (the highest designation granted by LEED), making it one of the few LEED Platinum–certified hotels in the US. A plaque commemorating this certification is mounted outside the building. The Hotel Marcel was the US's first hotel certified as having net-zero emissions. The hotel received a Passive House green building certification from the Passive House Institute, making it one of 140 buildings in the nation with that certification, as well as the world's first Passive House hotel with more than 100 rooms. Separately, the hotel won Boutique Design magazine's 2022 Gold Key award for eco- or socially conscious hotels. The adaptive-reuse project also received a 2022 Award of Excellence from Docomomo US and a 2023 Award of Merit from Preservation Connecticut.

== See also ==
- List of Brutalist architecture in the United States
- List of Marcel Breuer works
- National Register of Historic Places listings in New Haven, Connecticut
