= Elizabeth Browne =

Elizabeth Browne may refer to:

- Elizabeth Somerset, Countess of Worcester (died 1565) (c. 1502–1565), alleged mistress of Henry VIII
- Elizabeth FitzGerald, Countess of Lincoln (1527–1590), married name Elizabeth Browne, sister-in-law of the above, wife of Sir Anthony Browne

== See also ==
- Elizabeth Brown (disambiguation)
