= Beth Brown =

Beth Brown may refer to:

- Beth Brown (artist) (born 1977), American artist
- Beth A. Brown (1969–2008), American astrophysicist
