= Betty Brown (disambiguation) =

Betty Brown (born 1939) is a Texas politician.

Betty Brown may also refer to:

- Betty Brown (1759–after 1831), daughter of mulatto slave Betty Hemings and slave owned by Thomas and Martha Jefferson
- Betty Jean Brown (born 1937), political figure in Prince Edward Island
- Betty Brown, actress in silent film Davy Crockett at the Fall of the Alamo (1926)
- Betty Brown, first wife of entertainer Ted Healy and a performer in Healy's stage show
- Betty Brown (bowls), Scottish indoor and lawn bowler
- Betty Brown, oldest known victim of the British Post Office scandal, and recipient of the Order of the British Empire for services to justice for her campaigning for other victims of the scandal.

== See also ==
- Elizabeth Brown (disambiguation)
- Betty Brown Lake, see List of lakes in Cleburne County, Arkansas
