= Robert F. Gatje =

American architect (1927–2018)

Robert F. Gatje FAIA (November 27, 1927 – April 1, 2018) was an American architect.

Born to parents Frederick C. Gatje and Erna Kelting, Robert Gatje was raised in Brooklyn and attended Brooklyn Technical High School. Upon graduation, he enrolled at Deep Springs College. Gatje completed his bachelor's degree in architecture from Cornell University in 1951, after working for the United States Army Corps of Engineers between 1946 and 1947. He was a Fulbright Scholar in London before joining Marcel Breuer's firm in 1953, as a draftsman. Gatje left Breuer's firm in 1982, forming a partnership with Tician Papachristou and Hamilton Smith, then joined Richard Meier five years later. Gatje established a private practice in 1995. He died on 1 April 2018, of a stroke, aged 90.
