= Beth Brown (artist) =

American artist and author

Beth Brown (born Elizabeth Spruell, August 9, 1977) is an artist and author living in Richmond, Virginia.

== Personal life ==
Between the ages of three and five, she witnessed the deaths of her paternal grandmother, maternal grandfather, and her father to cancer. Brown attributes her fixation on ghosts and the presence of dark, but childish themes in much of her artwork to these early losses.

She is a graduate of Varina High School in Henrico County, Virginia, and earned a certificate in Automotive Technology from Richmond Technical Center.

== Visual art ==
Beth Brown is self-trained and works as a multimedia artist with a focus on printmaking. Her latest linoleum print series include "Mi Padre" (2008), a Mexican folk-inspired reflection of her growing up without a father, and "Clockwork - Memories of the Passing of Time" (2009). Brown's most recent series of paintings (2009–2010) highlights 21st Century controversy about patriotism and is called "A Declaration of Independence".

In 1995, she was selected by the Virginia Museum of Fine Arts to collaborate with a group of artists from the state (including Allen "Big Al" Carter of Washington, DC) to design and execute an 8 feet by 32 feet paneled mural celebrating Virginia's history. The completed work was installed outdoors at 1200 Semmes Avenue, Richmond, Virginia, but the building on which the mural was displayed was razed in 2001. The painting has since been relocated to the city's Northside Community Center.

Brown's artwork has been exhibited in international galleries, including:

- Art Works Gallery: Richmond, Virginia
- Arts East Gallery: La Grande, Oregon
- Print Zero Studios: Seattle, Washington
- University of Regina, Fifth Parallel Gallery: Saskatchewan, Canada
- SUNY Buffalo Center For the Arts (Main Stage): Buffalo, New York
- Eastern Oregon University Gallery: LaGrande, Oregon
- Nightingale Gallery: LaGrande, Oregon
- Sev Shoon Arts Center/Ballard Works: Seattle, Washington
- Rainbow Bldg. Gallery at University of Miami: Coral Gables, Florida
- Print Walls Gallery at University of Wisconsin: Madison, Wisconsin
- Pratt Fine Arts Gallery (at Tashiro Kaplan): Seattle, Washington
- SUNY Buffalo CFA Main Stage Cases: Buffalo, New York
- Roennebæksholm Arts and Cultur Center: Naestved, Denmark
- Pacific Northwest College of Arts: Portland, Oregon

== Written works ==
Beth Brown established Iron Cauldron Books in 2007 and published a collection of family recipes in 2008 under the title From a Witch's Kitchen: Celebrating Seasonal Magic In Every Meal. Soon to follow was Conducting a Paranormal Investigation - a Training Guide. Expanding on her lifelong interest in ghosts and the supernatural, Haunted Battlefields: Virginia's Civil War Ghosts from Schiffer Publishing Ltd. established Brown as an authority on the long-term study of paranormal activity.

Haunted Plantations of Virginia was published by Schiffer Publishing Ltd. in 2009 and was the winner of the People's Choice Prize in the non-fiction category of the 13th Annual Library of Virginia Literary Awards.

== Paranormal research ==
Brown began informal study of the spirit world in 1989 by collecting audio recordings in search of Electronic Voice Phenomena (EVP). Her work evolved to include video recordings and still photography by 1996. Of the sites where she conducted extensive field trials, some consisting of 50 or more visits per year, Brown refers most often to those near her childhood home in Varina: Fort Harrison, Tree Hill, Malvern Hill, Savage's Station, and Rockets Landing. She coordinated the first paranormal investigation of Monumental Church (Richmond, Virginia) and has, to date, conducted the only official study of Sherwood Forest (Charles City, Virginia), home of President John Tyler.

In 2007, she founded the Virginia Society of Paranormal Education and Research (VASPER) to help connect paranormal researchers across the state.

In July 2010, FATE Magazine announced that Brown was signed as a contributing writer for the 60+ year old publication. FATE Magazine also shared that their subsidiary, FATE Radio would be debuting her latest paranormal radio series called Psience Friction in September 2010.
