= Elizabeth Mills Brown =

American architectural historian (1916–2008)

Elizabeth Mills Brown (November 28, 1916 – December 27, 2008) was a prominent American architectural historian, preservationist, and civic leader who lived in New Haven and Guilford, Connecticut.

Brown was raised in New York City and graduated from the Chapin School in 1934. She then graduated from Bennington College and earned a master's degree from Yale University.

She was the author of New Haven: A Guide to Architecture and Urban Design (Yale University Press, 1976), a meticulously researched volume which details over 500 structures in that 400-year-old city. New Haven: A Guide has been reprinted many times and is widely considered to be the best source of information on New Haven's architectural history and urbanism. The book called the landmark New Haven Coliseum building, which was new at the time, a structure of "gigantic scale" that gave spectators an "experience of sheer spatial intoxication."
