= Bloody Angle (Lexington and Concord) =

Battle of the American Revolutionary War

- Part of the American Revolutionary War
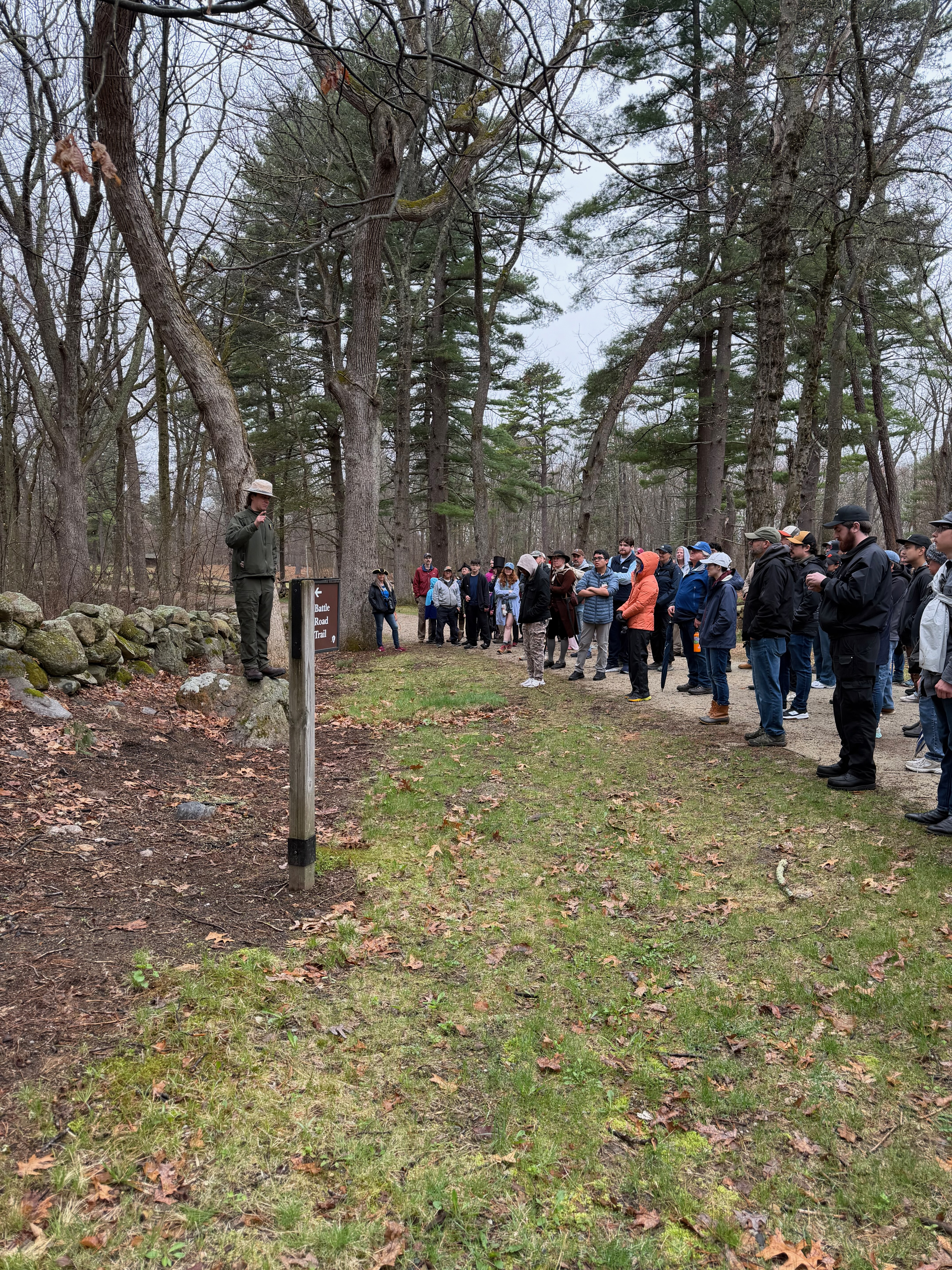
- A National Park Service ranger talking about the Bloody Angle at its northern end
Date	April 19, 1775 (251 years ago)
Location	Lincoln, Massachusetts 42.45606°N 71.29757°W
Result	Massachusetts Bay victory

Belligerents
Massachusetts Bay	Great Britain

Commanders and leaders
	(Kingdom of Great Britain) Francis Smith

Casualties and losses
4 killed	30 killed or wounded
- Location within Massachusetts

The Bloody Angle (also known as the Elm Brook Hill Battle) refers to a section of the Battle Road, in Lincoln, Massachusetts, on which two battles were fought on April 19, 1775, during the battles of Lexington and Concord, in the first stage of the American Revolutionary War. The road runs east–west, but turns north for about 500 yards (460 m) and then east again, as per the direction of travel during the British regulars' retreat from nearby Concord to Boston.

In 2024, archaeologists found a grouping of musket balls at the location, revealing troop positions.

== Route ==
The route deemed to be the Battle Road falls completely within today's Minute Man National Historic Park. The following points of interest are located along the road (from west to east, to align with the timeline of events of April 19, 1775) in the immediate build-up to the battle at Bloody Angle.

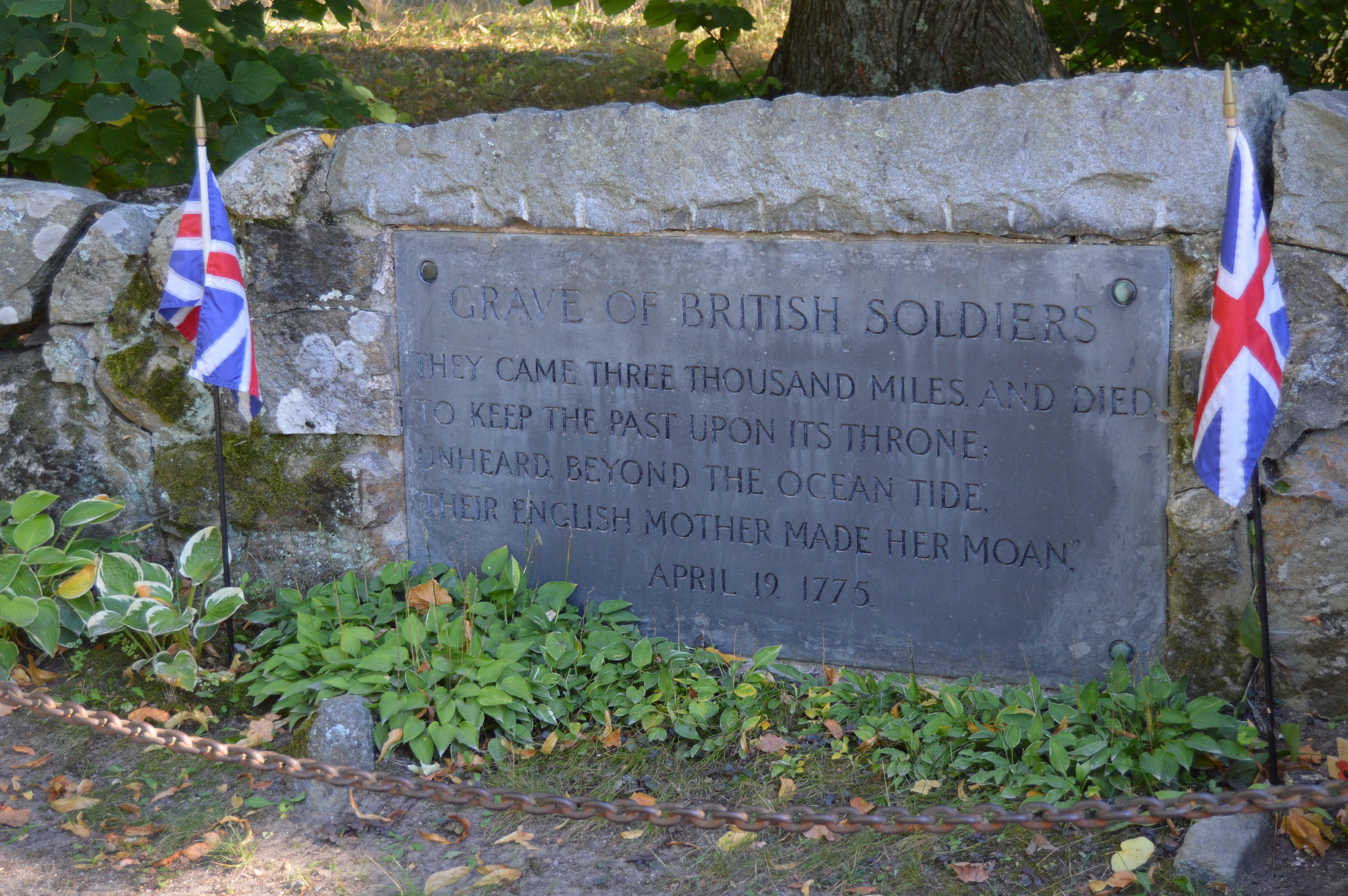
One of the grave sites of British soldiers

Meriam's Corner (Lexington Road and Old Bedford Road), Concord

Site of the first confrontation between the colonial militia and the British column. The skirmishes continued for the next eighteen miles. (12.30 PM)

- Grave of British soldiers
- Nathan Meriam House

Lexington Road, Concord

- Farwell Jones House
- Stow-Hardy House
- Samuel Brooks House

Route 2A (North Great Road), Lincoln

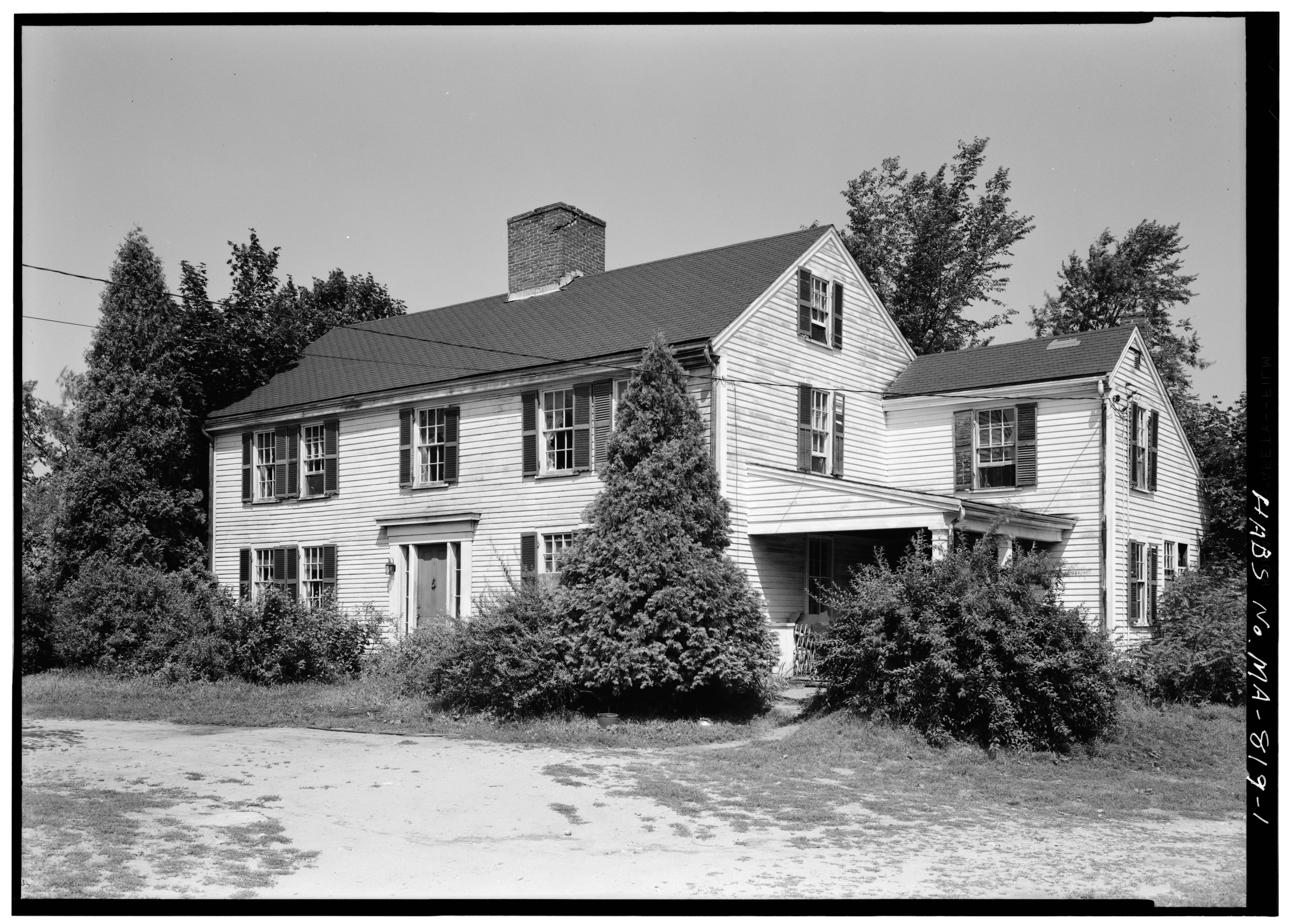
Samuel Brooks House

- Brooks Hill (12.45 PM)
- Noah Brooks Tavern
- Job Brooks House
- Joshua Brooks House

The regulars soon reached a point in the road, now referred to as the "Bloody Angle", where the road rises and curves sharply to the left through a lightly wooded area. At this place, the militia company from Woburn had positioned themselves on the southeast side of the bend in the road in a rocky, lightly wooded field. Additional militia flowing parallel to the road from the engagement at Meriam's Corner positioned themselves on the northwest side of the road, catching the British in a crossfire, while other militia companies on the road closed from behind to attack. Some 500 yards (460 m) further along, the road took another sharp curve, this time to the right, and again the British column was caught by another large force of militiamen firing from both sides. In passing through these two sharp curves, the British force lost thirty soldiers killed or wounded, and four colonial militia were also killed, including Captain Jonathan Wilson of Bedford, Captain Nathan Wyman of Billerica, Lt. John Bacon of Natick, and Daniel Thompson of Woburn. The British soldiers escaped by breaking into a trot, a pace that the colonials could not maintain through the woods and swampy terrain. Colonial forces on the road itself behind the British were too densely packed and disorganized to mount more than a harassing attack from the rear.

As militia forces from other towns continued to arrive, the colonial forces had risen to about 2,000 men. The road now straightened to the east, with cleared fields and orchards along the sides. Lieutenant Colonel Francis Smith sent out flankers again, who succeeded in trapping some militia from behind and inflicting casualties. British casualties were also mounting from these engagements and from persistent long-range fire from the militiamen, and the exhausted British were running out of ammunition.
