= Job Brooks House =

Historic house in Lincoln, Massachusetts

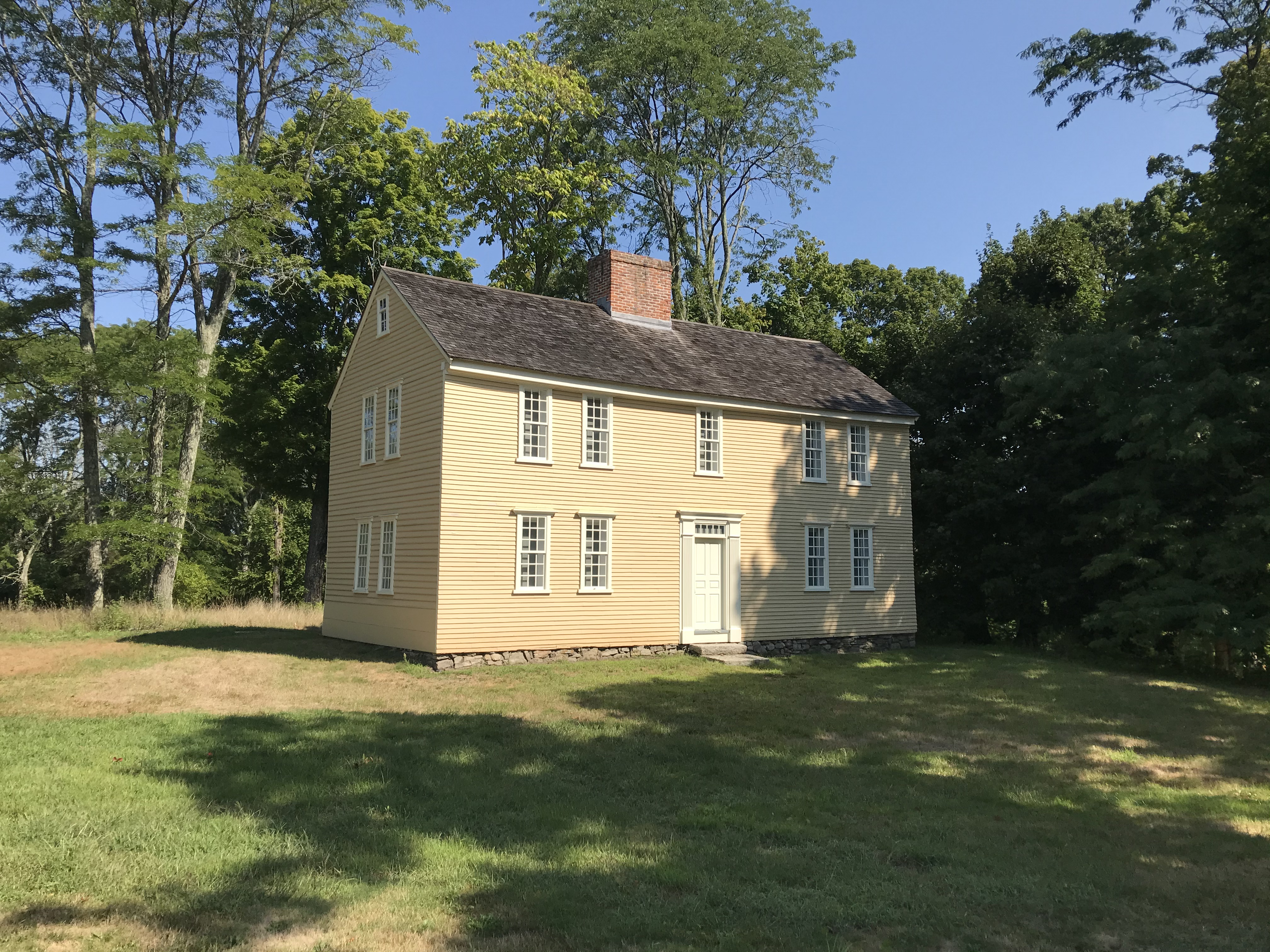
- Job Brooks House
- Interactive map of the Job Brooks House area

General information
- Architectural style: Colonial
- Location: Lincoln, Massachusetts, U.S. (Concord until 1754), North Great Road
- Coordinates: 42.45339°N 71.30534°W
- Completed: 1740 (286 years ago)

Technical details
- Floor count: 2 (including the cellar)

Design and construction
- Main contractor: Job Brooks

The Job Brooks House is a historic American Revolutionary War site in Lincoln, Massachusetts, United States. It is part of today's Minute Man National Historic Park.

It is located on North Great Road, just off Battle Road (formerly the Bay Road), about 0.6 miles (0.97 km) west of the contemporary Hartwell Tavern. There are three other Brooks-family houses within a quarter mile — the Samuel Brooks House, the Noah Brooks Tavern and the Joshua Brooks House — hence the area is called Brooks Village.

Job Brooks (1717–1794) and his family lived in the house he built, in 1740, just east of his second cousin Samuel Brooks's house on Concord's Bay Road in Concord. It was located on the border of the town of Lincoln, in an area that had been owned by members of his family since the mid-17th century. By the time of the Revolution, this area was known as Brooks Hill, and the cluster of houses on it Brooks Village.

Brooks was married to Anna Bridge of nearby Lexington, with whom he had three children: Mathew, Asa and Anna.

Job died in 1794, and left the house to Asa.

It was purchased by Minute Man National Historic Park in 1959. Today, the house serves as a storage facility for the Park's archaeological collection of more than a quarter-million artifacts from the early Archaic period through the 20th century.

== Battles of Lexington and Concord ==
The battles of Lexington and Concord took form before dawn on April 19, 1775. Soldiers passed by the house on their way to Concord, and again on their way back to Boston.

Paul Revere and William Dawes were detained by a British Army patrol nearby during the "Midnight Ride" to Concord of April 18. Samuel Prescott, who was also riding with them, escaped by jumping his horse over a wall and into the woods. Prescott emerged at the Hartwell Tavern, awakened Ephraim and informed him of the pending arrival of the British soldiers. Ephraim sent his black slave, Violet, down the road to alert his son and his family. Mary then relayed the message to Captain William Smith, commanding officer of the Lincoln minutemen, who lived a little to the west and whose home still stands along Battle Road. The minutemen received the notice in time, and arrived at Old North Bridge before their enemy. Prescott made it to Concord.
