= Jacob Whittemore House =

House in Lexington, Massachusetts

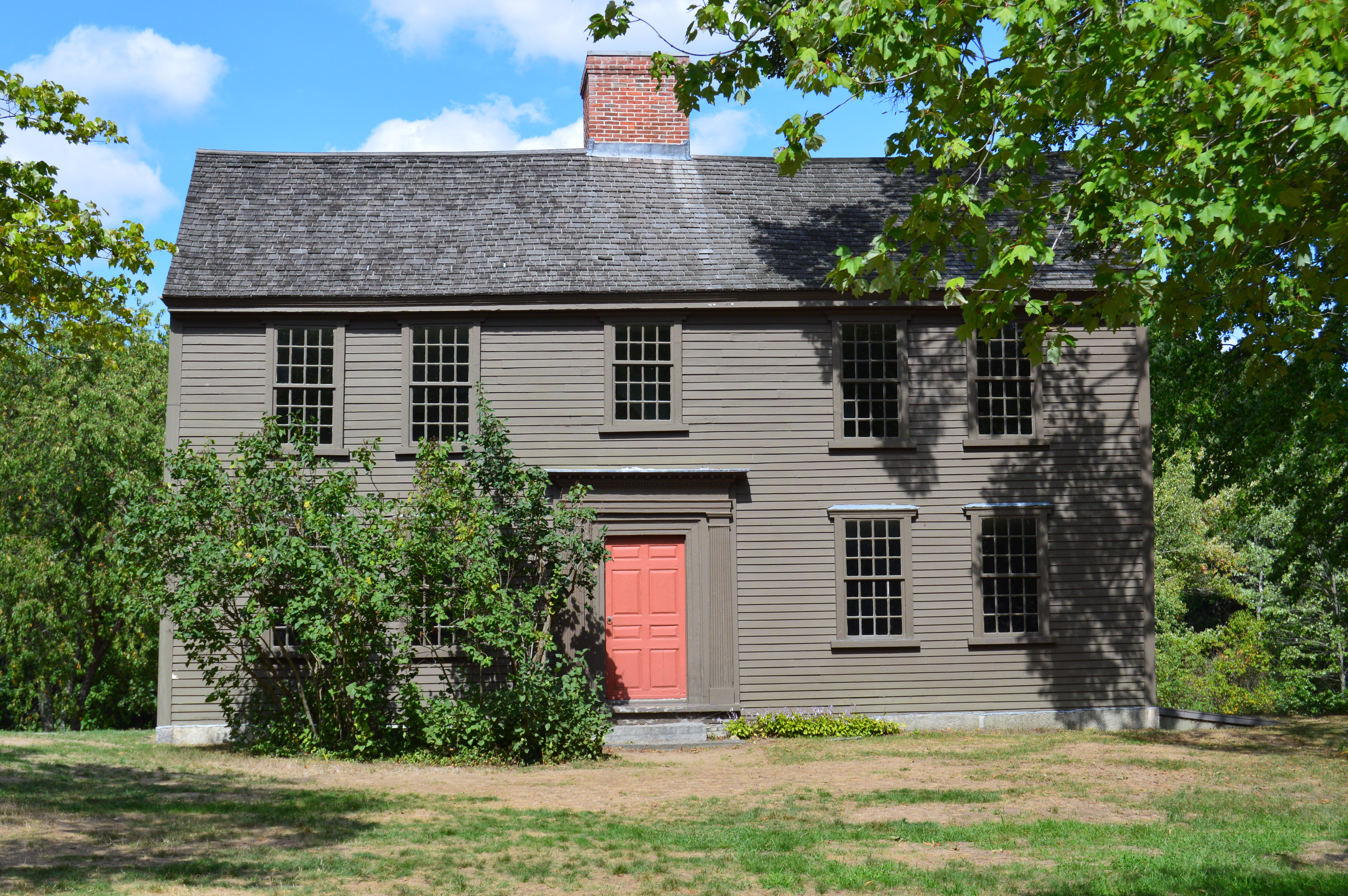
- The house in 2016, exactly three hundred years after its construction
- Interactive map of the Jacob Whittemore House area

General information
- Architectural style: Colonial
- Location: Lexington, Massachusetts, U.S., Airport Road
- Coordinates: 42.44905°N 71.26750°W
- Completed: 1716 (310 years ago)

Technical details
- Floor count: 4 (including the cellar)

Design and construction
- Main contractor: Nathaniel Whittemore

The Jacob Whittemore House is a historic American Revolutionary War site in Lexington, Massachusetts, United States. It is part of today's Minute Man National Historic Park. It is located on Airport Road, just off Battle Road (formerly the Bay Road). It is the only house of the National Historic Park's "witness" houses of the April 19, 1775 battles of Lexington and Concord to fall inside the Lexington town line; the others are in Lincoln or Concord.

In 1775, the outbreak of the Revolutionary War, it was the home of Jacob Whittemore; his wife, Elizabeth; their daughter, Sarah; Sarah's husband, Moses; and their three small children.

The Whittemore family sold the property in 1780.

== Battles of Lexington and Concord ==
Paul Revere and William Dawes were detained by a British Army patrol nearby during the "Midnight Ride" to Concord of April 18. Samuel Prescott, who was also riding with them, escaped by jumping his horse over a wall and into the woods. Prescott emerged at the Hartwell Tavern, awakened Ephraim and informed him of the pending arrival of the British soldiers. Ephraim sent his black slave, Violet, down the road to alert his son and his family. Mary then relayed the message to Captain William Smith, commanding officer of the Lincoln minutemen, who lived a little to the west and whose home still stands along Battle Road. The minutemen received the notice in time, and arrived at Old North Bridge before their enemy. Prescott made it to Concord.

The battles of Lexington and Concord took form before dawn on April 19, 1775. Soldiers passed by the house on their way to Concord, and again on their way back to Boston.

Neither Jacob nor Moses fought with the Lexington militia on April 19, although Jacob had trained with them and Moses volunteered for other Revolutionary War campaigns. Instead, Jacob helped Moses carry his wife, Sarah, who was still recovering from the birth of her third child eighteen days earlier, and her children, to the relative safety of a nearby woodlot just before the battle reached their home. To the west of the house, Captain John Parker led the Lexington militia in engaging the retreating British regulars.

== Gallery ==
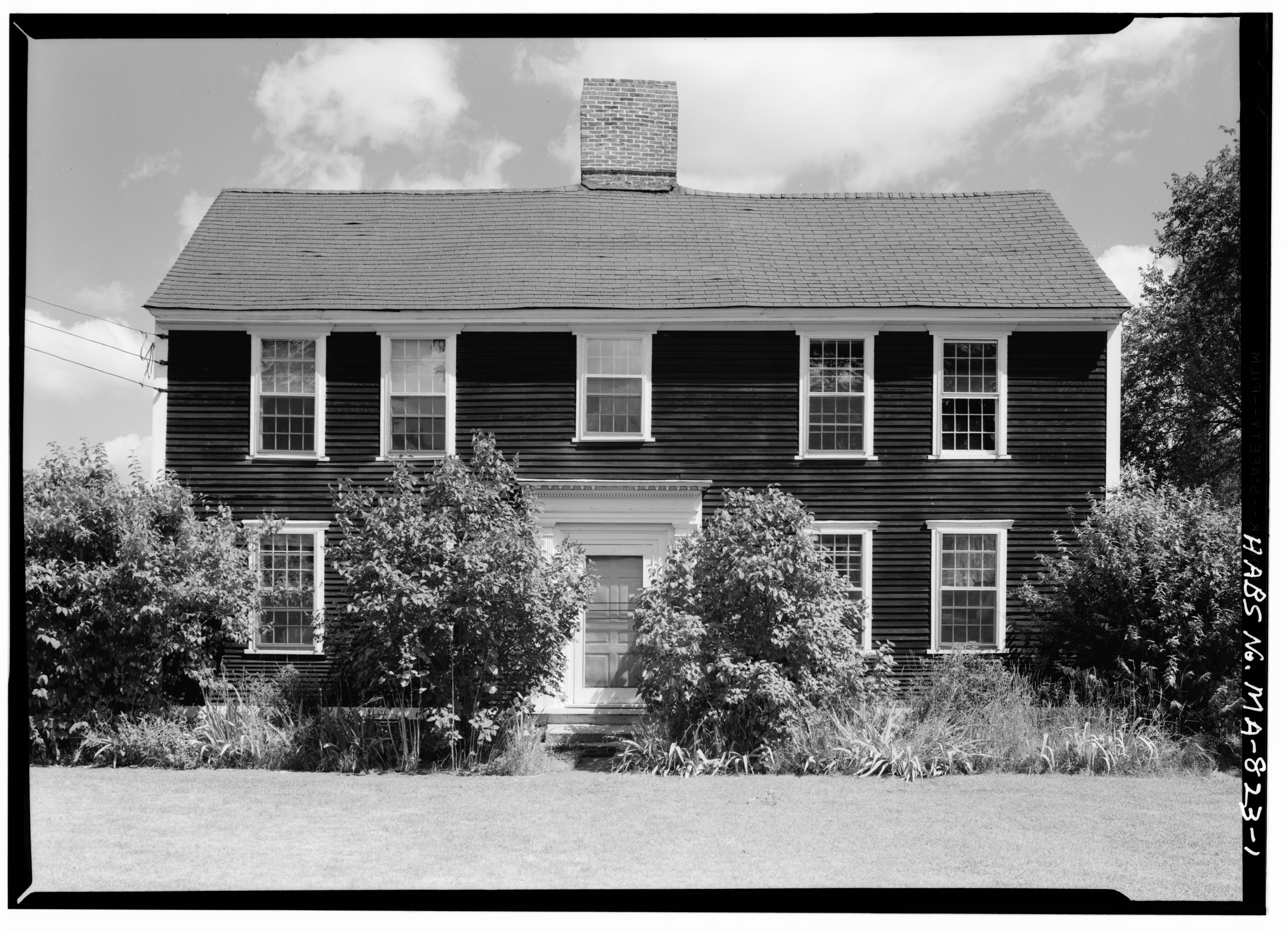
The house in the second half of the 20th century
