= Battle Road =

Historic road in Lincoln, Massachusetts

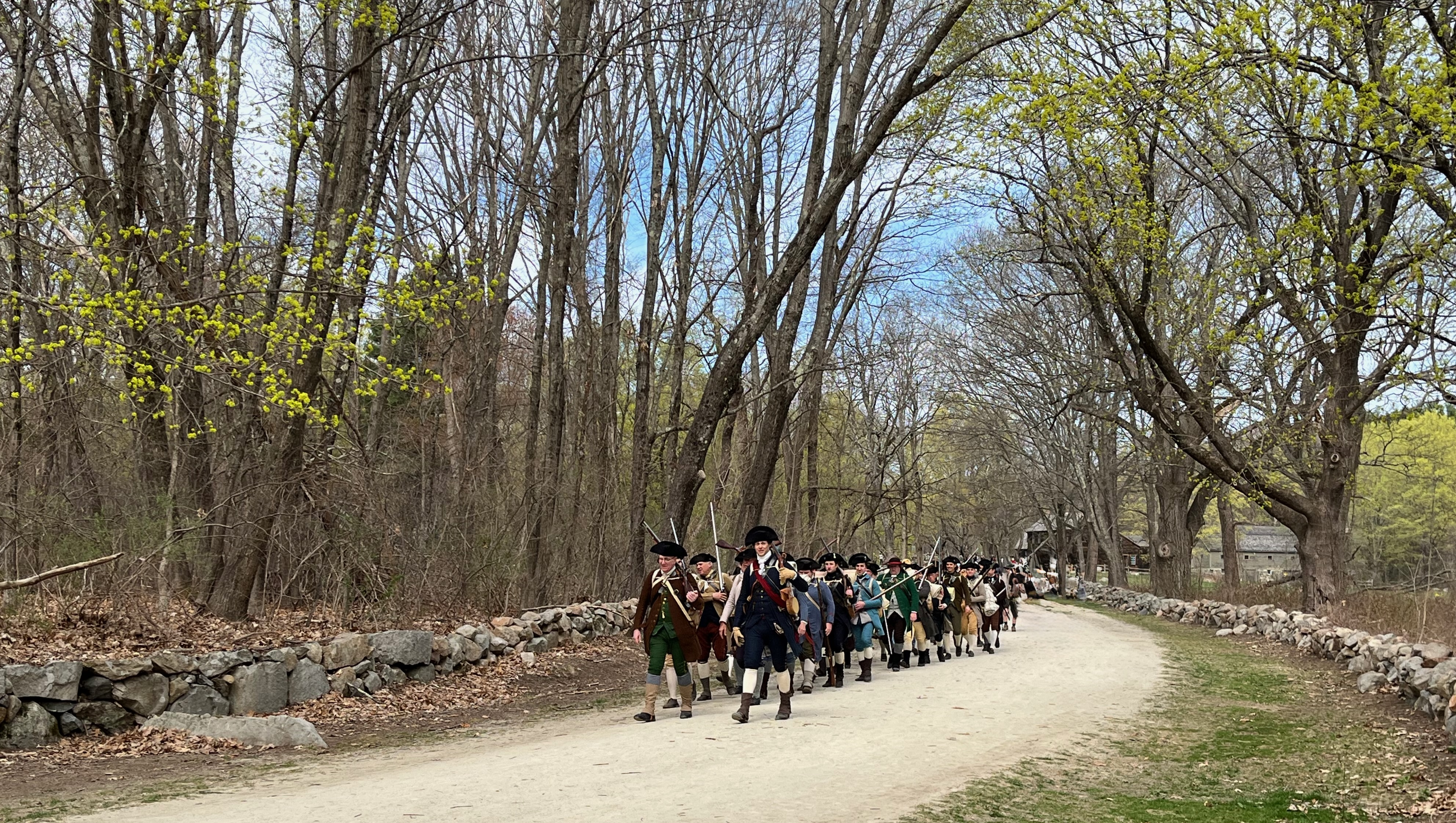
- Colonial militia reenactors walking on Battle Road between Hartwell Tavern and the Captain William Smith House
- Former names: Old Concord Road; Bay Road
- Namesake: Battles of Lexington and Concord
- Length: 18 mi (29 km)
- Location: Concord, Massachusetts; Lincoln, Massachusetts; Lexington, Massachusetts
- West end: Lexington Road and Old Bedford Road, Concord
- East end: Wood Street, Lexington

Battle Road, formerly known as the Old Concord Road and the Bay Road, is a historic road in Massachusetts, United States. It was formerly part of the main road connecting Lexington, Lincoln and Concord, three of the main towns involved in the American Revolutionary War. It was on Battle Road that thousands of colonial militia and British regulars fought during the redcoats' retreat from Concord to Boston on the morning and afternoon of April 19, 1775.

== Battles of Lexington and Concord ==
=== Redcoats' retreat to Boston ===
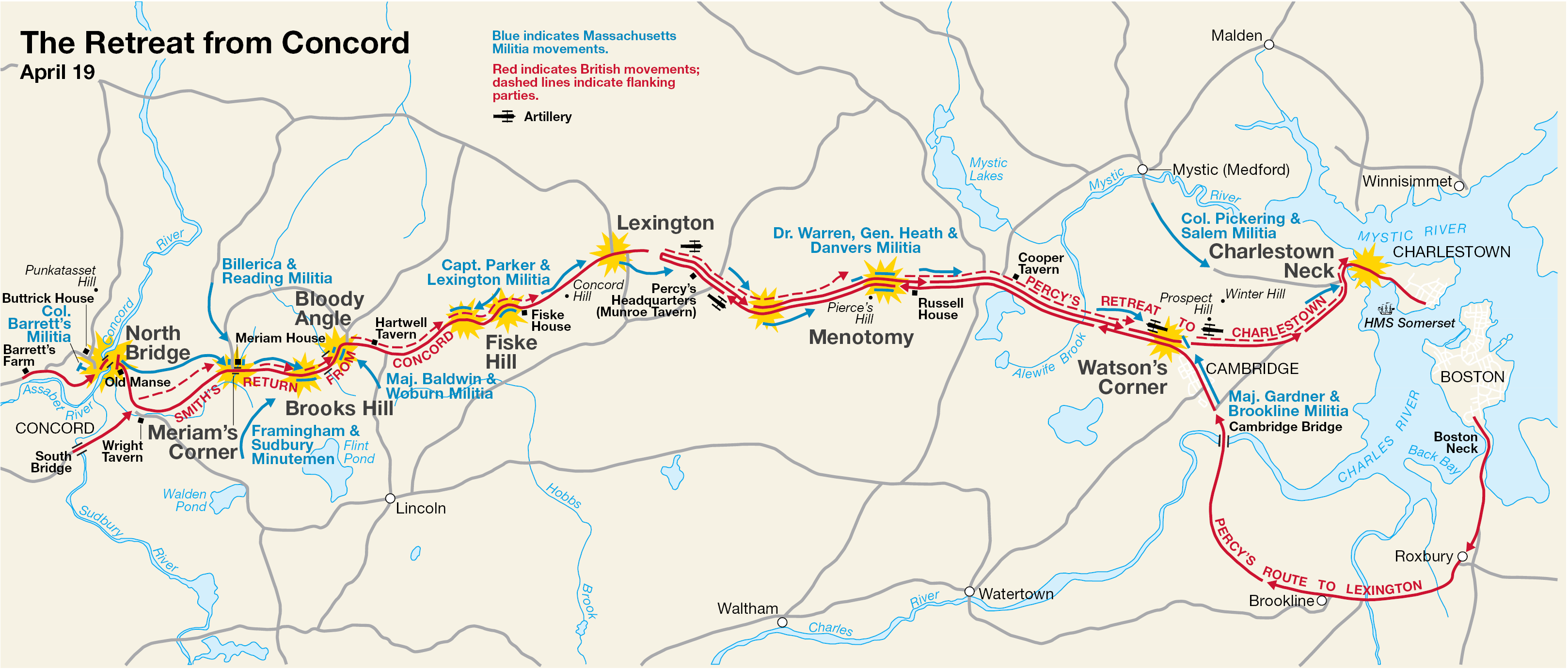
A National Park Service map showing the redcoats' retreat from Concord

Lieutenant Colonel Francis Smith, concerned about the safety of his men, sent flankers to follow a ridge and protect his forces from the roughly one thousand colonials now in the field as the British marched east out of Concord. This ridge ended near Meriam's Corner, a crossroads about a mile (2 km) outside the village of Concord, where the main road came to a bridge across a small stream. To cross the narrow bridge, the British had to pull the flankers back into the main column and close ranks to a mere three soldiers abreast. Colonial militia companies arriving from the north and east had converged at this point and presented a clear numerical advantage over the regulars. The British were now witnessing once again what General Thomas Gage had hoped to avoid by dispatching the expedition in secrecy and in the dark of night: the ability of the colonial militiamen to rise and converge by the thousands when British forces ventured out of Boston. As the last of the British column marched over the narrow bridge, the British rear guard wheeled and fired a volley at the colonial militiamen, who had been firing irregularly and ineffectively from a distance but now had closed to within musket range. The colonists returned fire, this time with deadly effect. Two regulars were killed and perhaps six wounded, with no colonial casualties. Smith sent out his flanking troops again after crossing the small bridge.

On Brooks Hill (also known as Hardy's Hill) about 1 mile (1.6 km) past Meriam's Corner, nearly 500 militiamen had assembled to the south of the road, awaiting an opportunity to fire down upon the British column on the road below. Smith's leading forces charged up the hill to drive them off, but the colonists did not withdraw, inflicting significant casualties on the attackers. Smith withdrew his men from Brooks Hill, and the column continued on to another small bridge into Lincoln, at Brooks Tavern, where more militia companies intensified the attack from the north side of the road.

The regulars soon reached a point in the road, now referred to as the "Bloody Angle", where the road rises and curves sharply to the left through a lightly wooded area. At this place, the militia company from Woburn had positioned themselves on the southeast side of the bend in the road in a rocky, lightly wooded field. Additional militia flowing parallel to the road from the engagement at Meriam's Corner positioned themselves on the northwest side of the road, catching the British in a crossfire, while other militia companies on the road closed from behind to attack. Some 500 yards (460 m) further along, the road took another sharp curve, this time to the right, and again the British column was caught by another large force of militiamen firing from both sides. In passing through these two sharp curves, the British force lost thirty soldiers killed or wounded, and four colonial militia were also killed, including Captain Jonathan Wilson of Bedford, Captain Nathan Wyman of Billerica, Lt. John Bacon of Natick, and Daniel Thompson of Woburn. The British soldiers escaped by breaking into a trot, a pace that the colonials could not maintain through the woods and swampy terrain. Colonial forces on the road itself behind the British were too densely packed and disorganized to mount more than a harassing attack from the rear.

As militia forces from other towns continued to arrive, the colonial forces had risen to about 2,000 men. The road now straightened to the east, with cleared fields and orchards along the sides. Lt. Col. Smith sent out flankers again, who succeeded in trapping some militia from behind and inflicting casualties. British casualties were also mounting from these engagements and from persistent long-range fire from the militiamen, and the exhausted British were running out of ammunition.

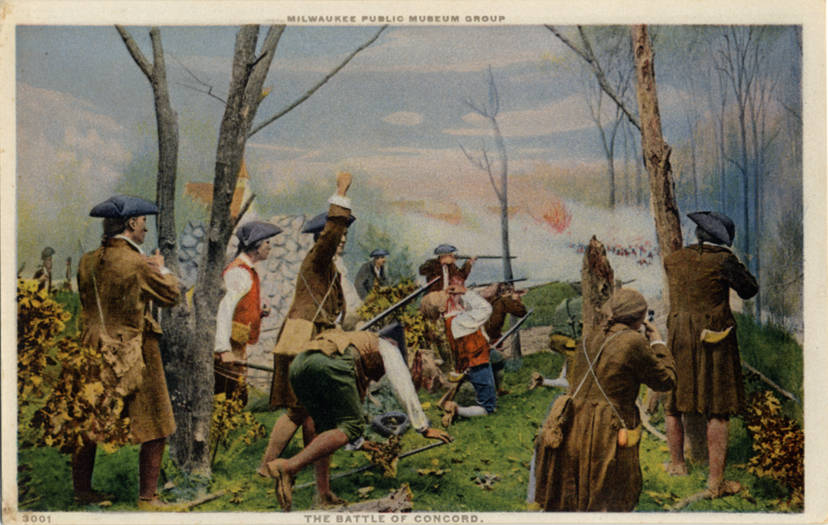
The Battle of Concord (unknown date)

When the British column neared the boundary between Lincoln and Lexington, it encountered another ambush from a hill overlooking the road, set by Captain John Parker's Lexington militiamen, including some of them bandaged up from the encounter in Lexington earlier in the day. At this point, Lt. Col. Smith was wounded in the thigh and knocked from his horse. Major John Pitcairn assumed effective command of the column and sent light infantry companies up the hill to clear the militia forces.

The light infantry cleared two additional hills as the column continued east—"The Bluff" and "Fiske Hill"— and took still more casualties from ambushes set by fresh militia companies joining the battle. In one of the musket volleys from the colonial soldiers, Major Pitcairn's horse bolted in fright, throwing Pitcairn to the ground and injuring his arm. Now both principal leaders of the expedition were injured or unhorsed, and their men were tired, thirsty, and exhausting their ammunition. A few surrendered or were captured; some now broke formation and ran forward toward Lexington. In the words of one British officer, "we began to run rather than retreat in order. ... We attempted to stop the men and form them two deep, but to no purpose, the confusion increased rather than lessened. ... the officers got to the front and presented their bayonets, and told the men if they advanced they should die. Upon this, they began to form up under heavy fire."

Only one British officer remained uninjured among the three companies at the head of the British column as it approached Lexington Center. He understood the column's perilous situation: "There were very few men had any ammunition left, and so fatigued that we could not keep flanking parties out, so that we must soon have laid down our arms, or been picked off by the Rebels at their pleasure—nearer to—and we were not able to keep them off." He then heard cheering further ahead. A full brigade, about 1,000 men with artillery under the command of Earl Percy, had arrived to rescue them. It was about 2:30 p.m., and the British column had now been on the march since 2 o'clock in the morning. Westford Minuteman Rev. Joseph Thaxter wrote of his account:

We pursued them and killed some; when they got to Lexington, they were so close pursued and fatigued, that they must have soon surrendered, had not Lord Percy met them with a large reinforcement and two field-pieces. They fired them, but the balls went high over our heads. But no cannon ever did more execution, such stories of their effects had been spread by the tories through our troops, that from this time more wont back than pursed. We pursued to Charlestown Common, and then retired to Cambridge. When the army collected at Cambridge, Colonel Prescott with his regiment of minute men, and John Robinson, his Lieutenant Colonel, were prompt at being at their post.

In their accounts afterward, British officers and soldiers alike noted their frustration that the colonial militiamen fired at them from behind trees and stone walls, rather than confronting them in large, linear formations in the style of European warfare. This image of the individual colonial farmer, musket in hand and fighting under his own command, has also been fostered in American myth: "Chasing the red-coats down the lane / Then crossing the fields to emerge again / Under the trees at the turn of the road, / And only pausing to fire and load." To the contrary, beginning at the North Bridge and throughout the British retreat, the colonial militias repeatedly operated as coordinated companies, even when dispersed to take advantage of cover. Reflecting on the British experience that day, Earl Percy understood the significance of the American tactics:

During the whole affair the Rebels attacked us in a very scattered, irregular manner, but with perseverance & resolution, nor did they ever dare to form into any regular body. Indeed, they knew too well what was proper, to do so. Whoever looks upon them as an irregular mob, will find himself much mistaken. They have men amongst them who know very well what they are about, having been employed as Rangers against the Indians & Canadians, & this country being much covered with wood, and hilly, is very advantageous for their method of fighting.

== Battle Road Trail ==
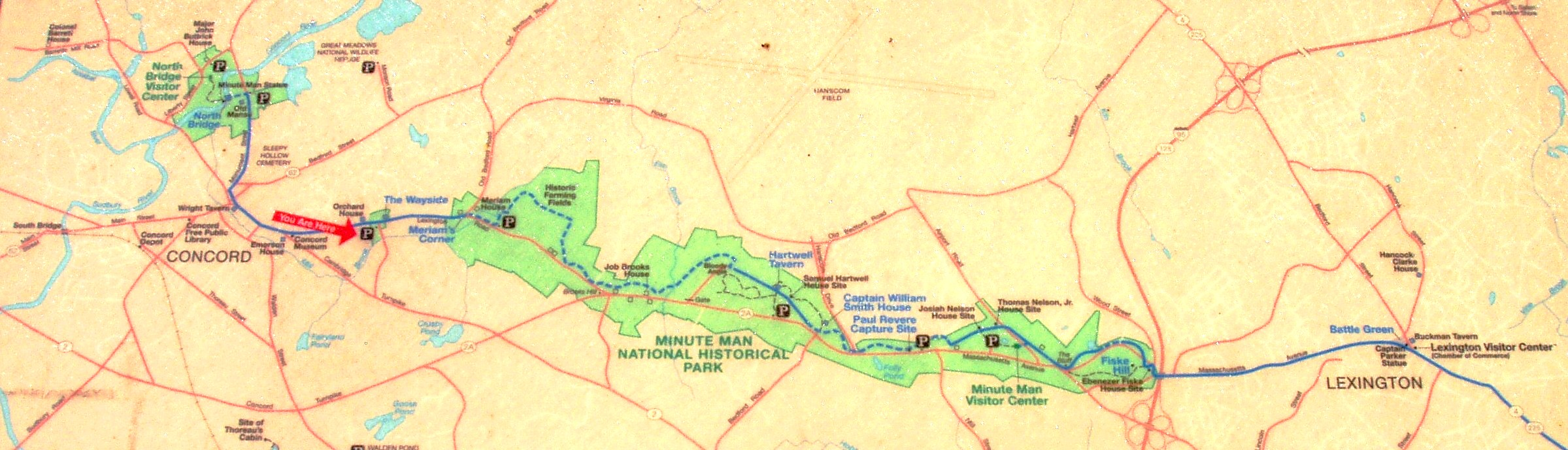
Map of Minute Man National Historic Park

A five-mile (8 km) section of Battle Road was taken into the care of the Minute Man National Historical Park, a subsidiary of the National Park Service, in 1959. It includes a restored colonial landscape approximating the path of the running skirmishes between British troops and Colonial militia, a monument at the site where Paul Revere was captured during his midnight ride, the Captain William Smith House, and the Hartwell Tavern, a restored 18th-century inn and house at which living history programs are presented from May through October. The Battle Road Trail is accessible from several different parking areas.

In some parts, the trail leaves the historic road in order to more closely follow the route of the minutemen, crossing fields, wetlands and passing through forests.

The terrain in the area features gentle hills, with variations in elevation from 150 feet (46 m) to 230 feet (70 m) above mean sea level.

=== Route ===
The route deemed to be the Battle Road falls completely within today's Minute Man National Historic Park.

==== Landmarks ====
The following points of interest are located along the road (from west to east, to align with the timeline of events of April 19, 1775).

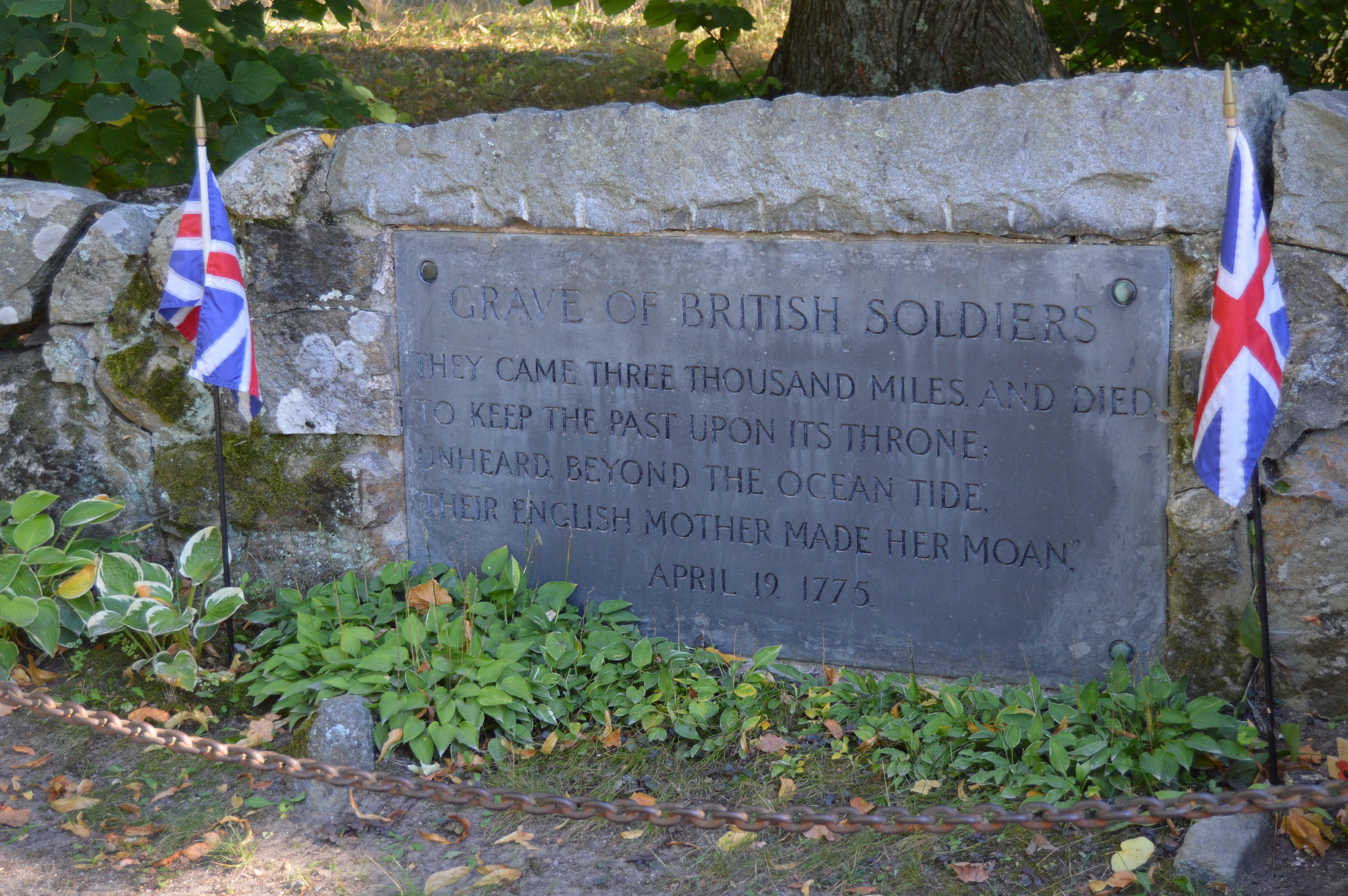
One of the grave sites of British soldiers

Meriam's Corner (Lexington Road and Old Bedford Road), Concord

Site of the first confrontation between the colonial militia and the British column. The skirmishes continued for the next eighteen miles. (12.30 PM)

- Grave of British soldiers
- Nathan Meriam House

Lexington Road, Concord

- Farwell Jones House
- Stow-Hardy House
- Samuel Brooks House

Route 2A (North Great Road), Lincoln

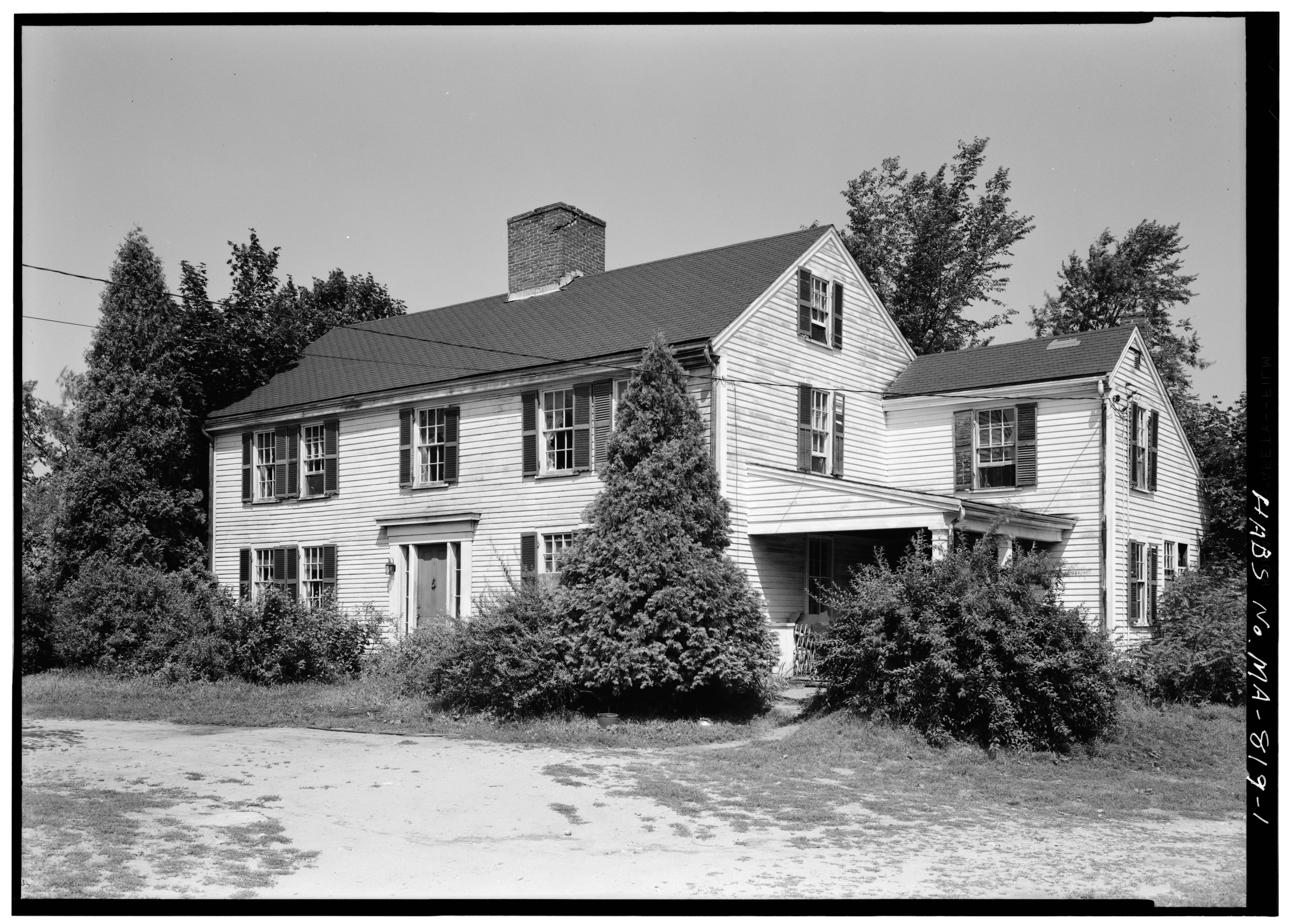
Samuel Brooks House

- Brooks Hill (12.45 PM)
- Noah Brooks Tavern
- Job Brooks House
- Joshua Brooks House

Route 2A (North Great Road) and Old Bedford Road, Lincoln

- The Bloody Angle (1.00 PM)
- Grave of British soldiers

Battle Road, Lincoln

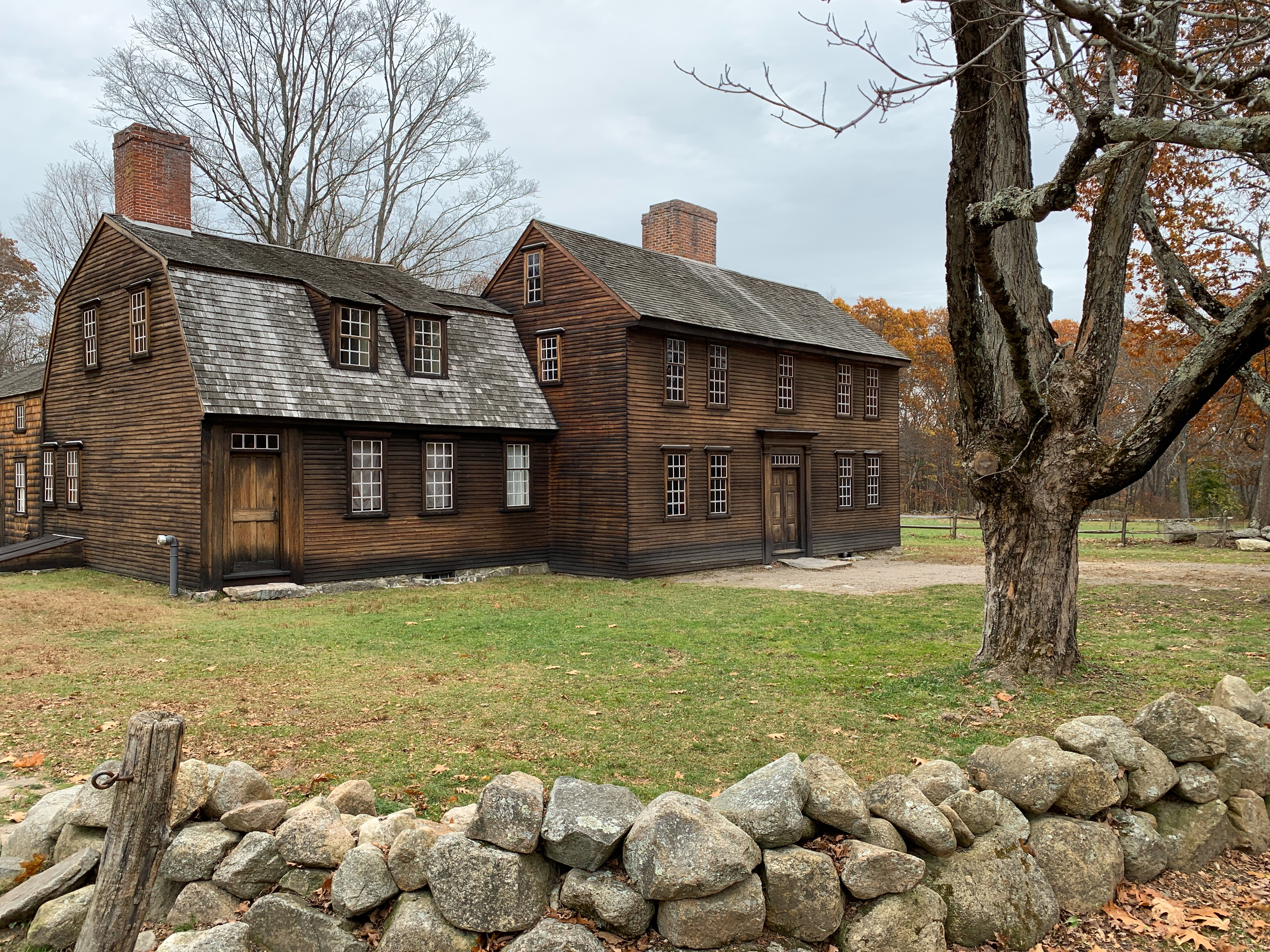
Hartwell Tavern, 2019

- The Fight Through Lincoln (1.10 PM)
- Hartwell Tavern
- Samuel Hartwell House (ruinous)
- Captain William Smith House

Route 2A (North Great Road), Lincoln

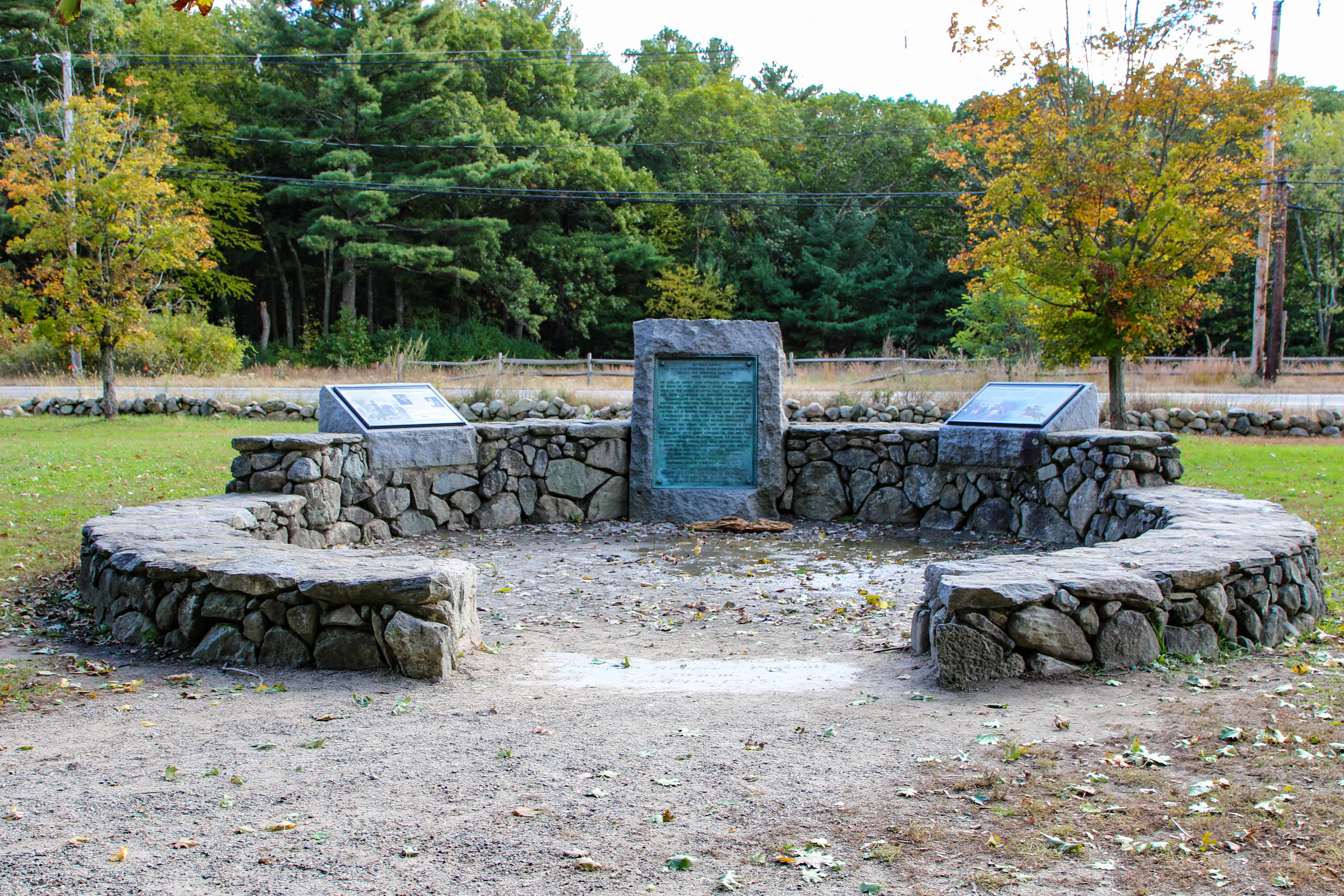
Paul Revere capture site

- Grave of British soldiers
- Paul Revere capture site

Battle Road, Lincoln

- Josiah Nelson House (ruinous)
- Grave of British soldiers
- Thomas Nelson Jr. House (ruinous)

Airport Road, Lexington

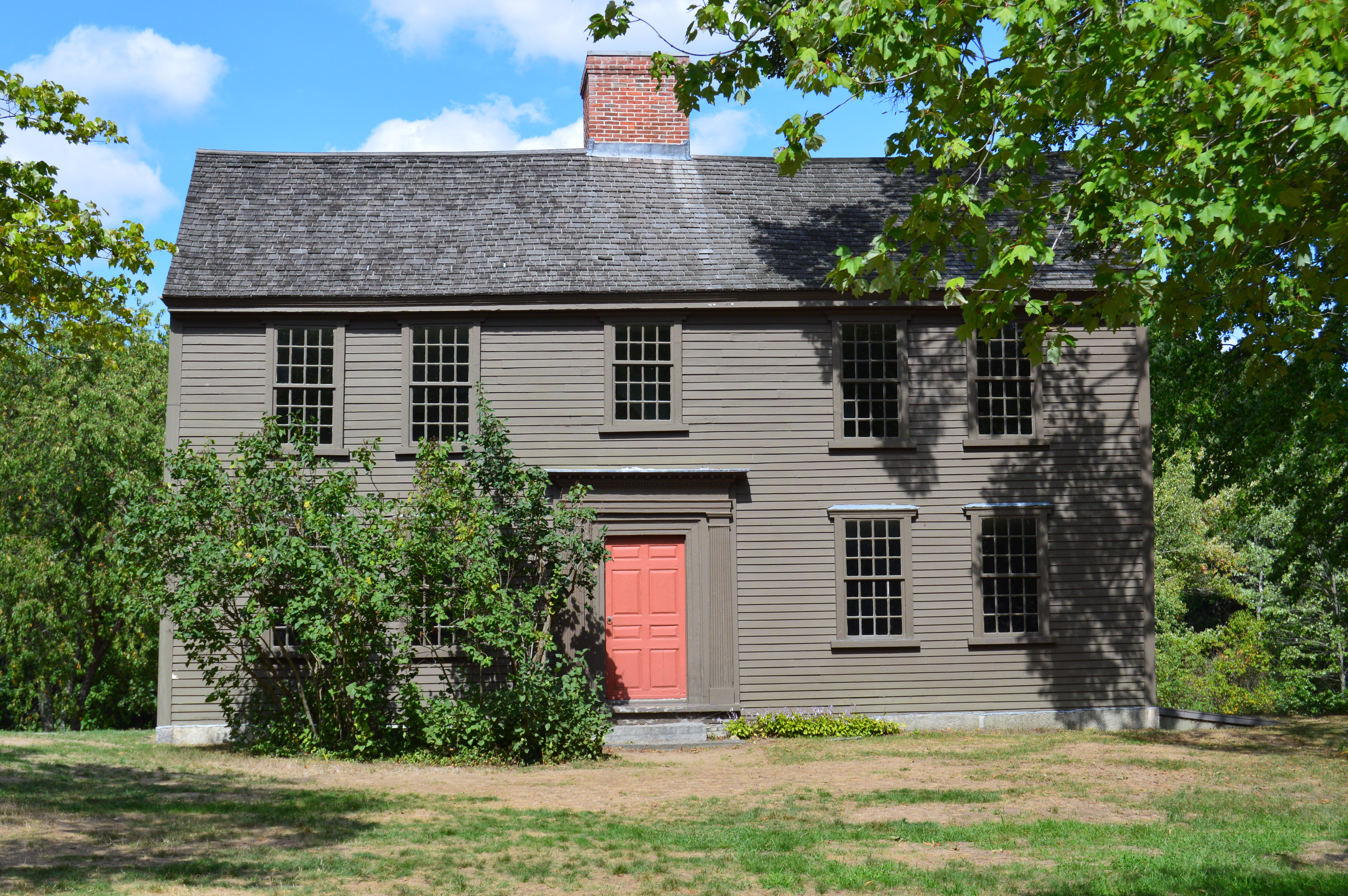
Jacob Whittemore House

- Tabitha Nelson House (ruinous)
- Captain John Parker's Revenge (1.30 PM)
- Jacob Whittemore House

Route 2A (North Great Road) and Old Massachusetts Avenue, Lexington

- The Bluff (1.35 PM)

Old Massachusetts Avenue, Lexington

- Grave of British soldiers
- Battle at Fiske Hill (1.40 PM)
- Grave of British soldiers
- Ebenezer Fiske House (foundation remnants only)
