= Paul Revere Capture Site =

Historic site in Lincoln, Massachusetts, US

- Part of the battles of Lexington and Concord
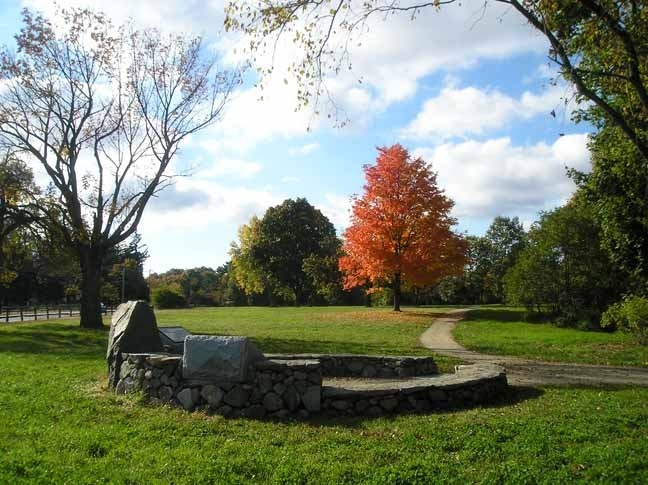
- The capture site in 2018, looking northwest along Battle Road
Date	April 19, 1775 (251 years ago)
Location	Lincoln, Massachusetts 42.44894623°N 71.2797909°W

Belligerents
Massachusetts Bay	Great Britain

Commanders and leaders
	(Kingdom of Great Britain) Francis Smith

Casualties and losses
0	0
- Location within Massachusetts

The Paul Revere Capture Site marks the location where Sons of Liberty member Paul Revere was captured by a British Army patrol at around 1.30 AM on April 19, 1775, while on a midnight ride to alert nearby minutemen of the pending arrival of British troops. The capture site is marked with a plaque beside the Battle Road in Lincoln, Massachusetts, in today's Minute Man National Historical Park.

It was at this location that Revere, William Dawes and Samuel Prescott were captured by a British patrol. They detained Revere, but Dawes turned around and fled, while Prescott made it through the roadblock and continued to Concord. Revere, who was en route from Lexington to Concord, was taken back to Lexington and released shortly afterward.

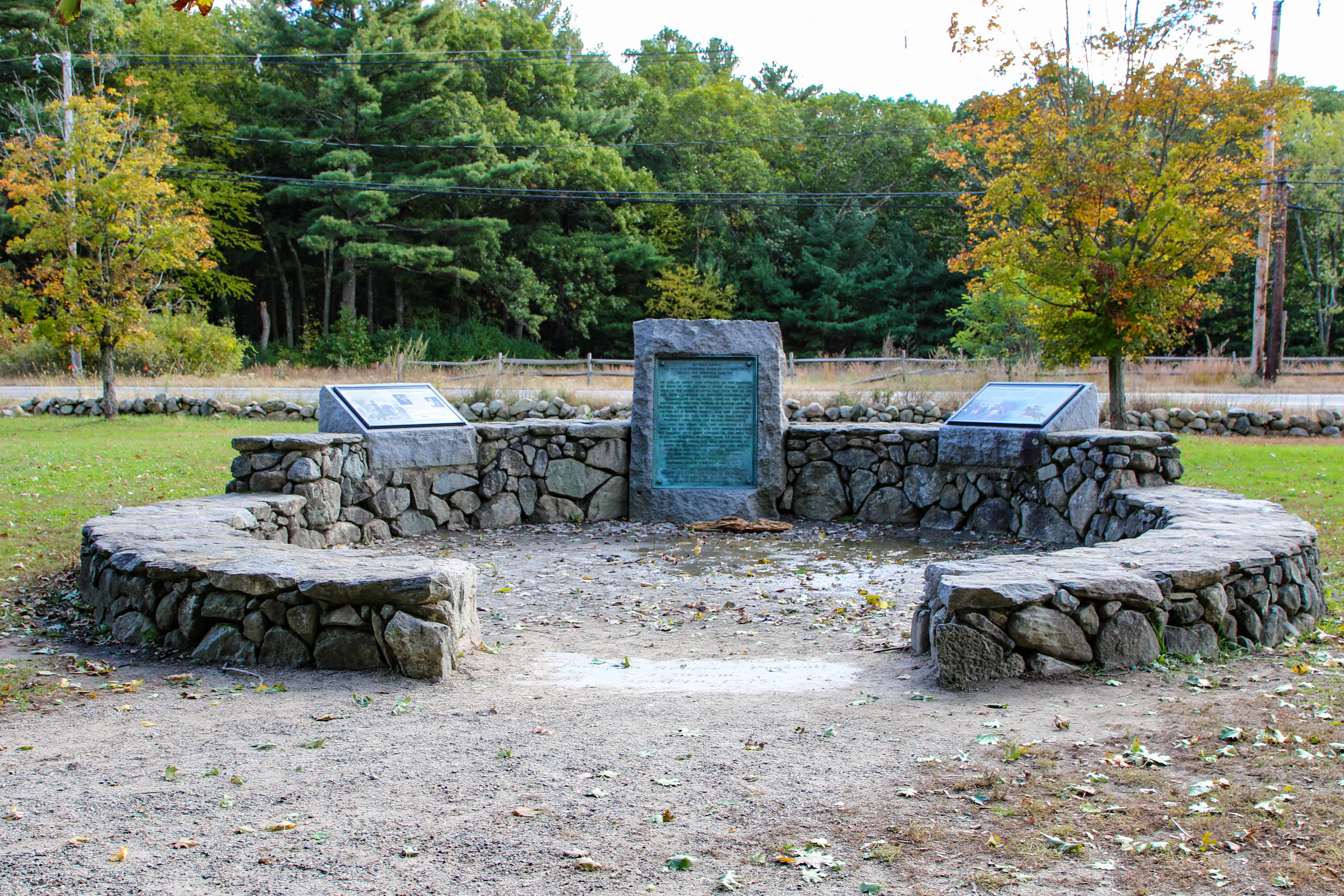
Monument detail, looking south toward Massachusetts Route 2A
