= Samuel Brooks House (Massachusetts) =

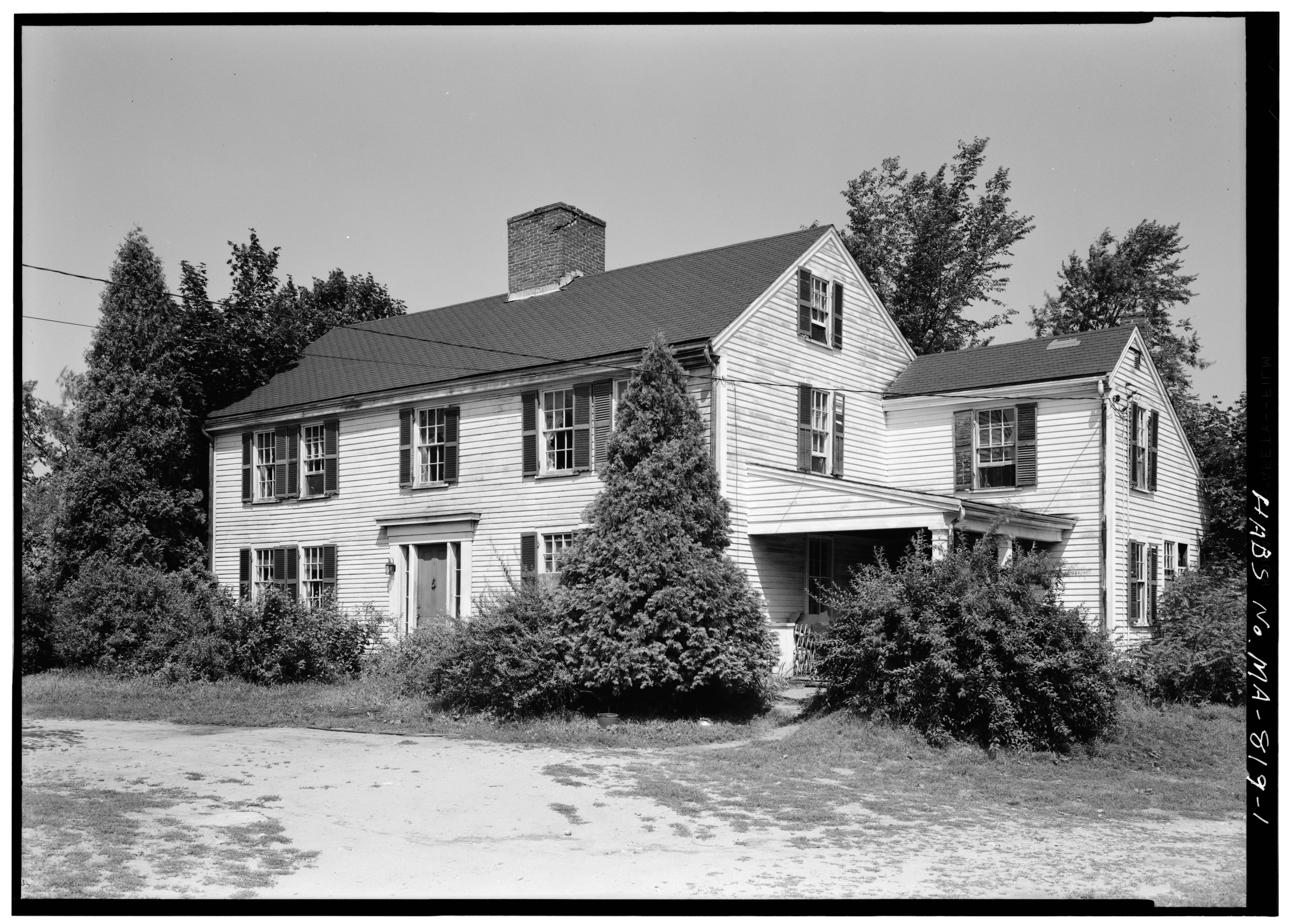
- The house in the mid-20th century
- Interactive map of the Samuel Brooks House area

General information
- Architectural style: Colonial, Georgian
- Location: Concord, Massachusetts, U.S., 1175 Lexington Rd
- Coordinates: 42.45339°N 71.30886°W
- Completed: 1692 (NPS); 1733 (MACRIS)

Technical details
- Floor count: 4 (including the cellar)

The Samuel Brooks House is a historic American Revolutionary War site in Concord, Massachusetts, United States. It is part of today's Minute Man National Historic Park. It is located on North Great Road, just off Battle Road (formerly the Bay Road).

The house is situated near the border of the town of Lincoln, in an area that had been owned by members of his family since the mid-17th century. By the time of the Revolution, this area was known as Brooks Hill, and the cluster of houses on it Brooks Village. There are three other Brooks-family houses within a quarter mile — the Job Brooks House, the Noah Brooks Tavern and the Joshua Brooks House.

Samuel Brooks inherited the house from his father, also Samuel. When he married Mary Bateman Flint, in 1781, he inherited seven stepchildren.

Brooks died in 1811.

The property was purchased by the National Park Service in 1963.

== Battles of Lexington and Concord ==
The battles of Lexington and Concord took form before dawn on April 19, 1775. Soldiers passed by the house on their way to Concord, and again on their way back to Boston.

Paul Revere and William Dawes were detained by a British Army patrol nearby during the "Midnight Ride" to Concord of April 18. Samuel Prescott, who was also riding with them, escaped by jumping his horse over a wall and into the woods. Prescott emerged at the Hartwell Tavern, awakened Ephraim and informed him of the pending arrival of the British soldiers. Ephraim sent his black slave, Violet, down the road to alert his son and his family. Mary then relayed the message to Captain William Smith, commanding officer of the Lincoln minutemen, who lived a little to the west and whose home still stands along Battle Road. The minutemen received the notice in time, and arrived at Old North Bridge before their enemy. Prescott made it to Concord.
