= Abel Prescott Jr. =

American patriot (1749–1775)

- Died: September 21, 1775 (aged 25)
- Known for: Midnight Ride
- Relatives: Samuel Prescott (brother)

Abel Prescott Jr. was one of the Americans who rode to warn that British troops were coming to Concord, Massachusetts on the eve of the American Revolution. While his brother Samuel Prescott was warning Concord about the British march to Concord, Abel rode south to warn the towns of Sudbury and Framingham. He was fired on by a British regular who spotted him as he was returning from Acton to Stow. He was slightly wounded in his side but succeeded in escaping by hiding himself in a house belonging to a Mrs. Heywood. Within four months he died of the wound and from dysentery at the age of 26.
