= Stow-Hardy House =

Colonial building in Massachusetts

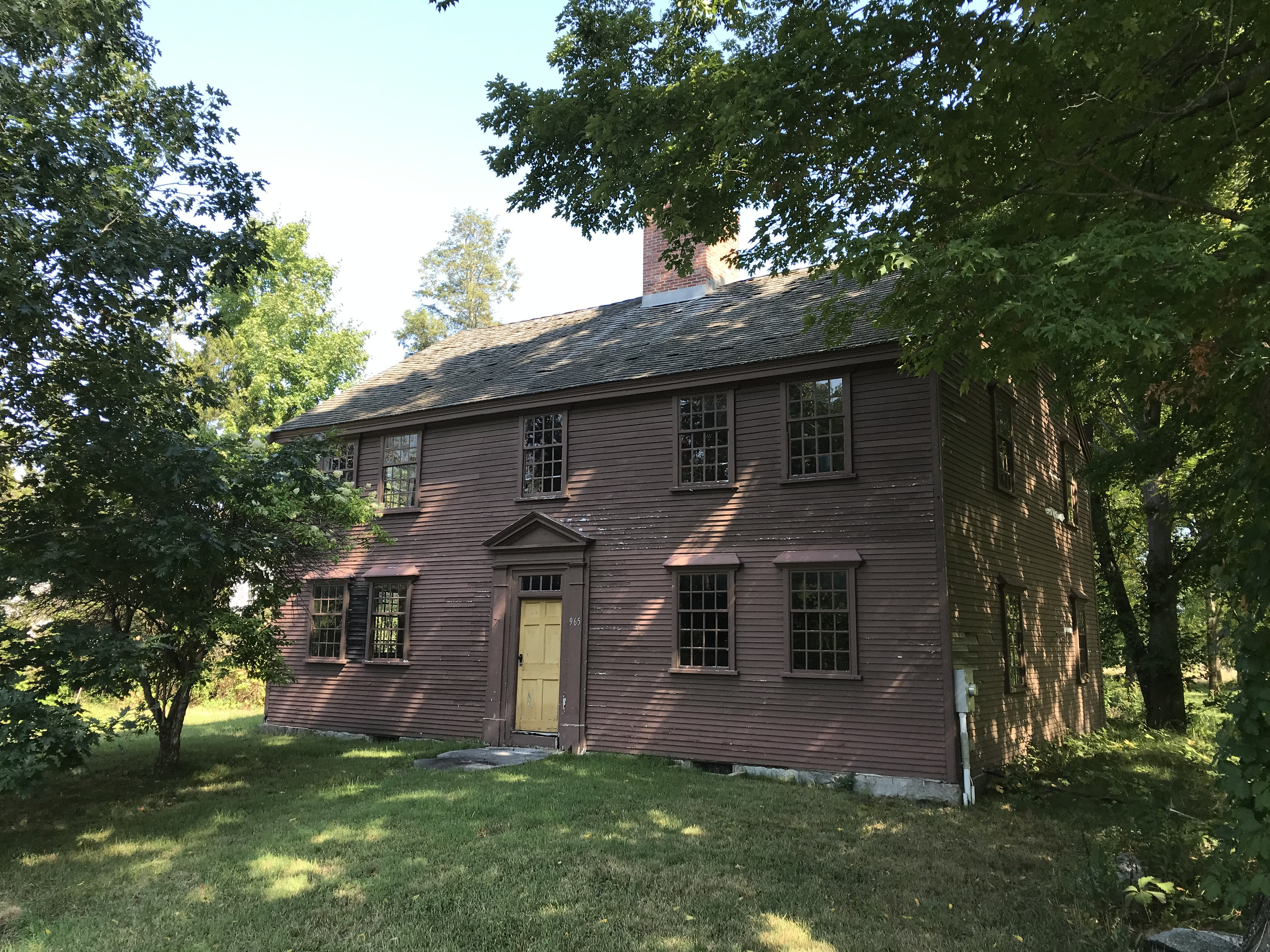
- Stow-Hardy House
- Interactive map of the Stow-Hardy House area

General information
- Location: Concord, Massachusetts, Lexington Road
- Coordinates: 42.4561617°N 71.3151880°W
- Completed: c. 1786 (240 years ago)

Technical details
- Floor count: 3

The Stow-Hardy House is a historic American Revolutionary War site associated with the revolution's first battle, the 1775 battles of Lexington and Concord. It stands, on the site of a previous home built around 1689, on Lexington Road in Concord, Massachusetts, just southwest of the former Battle Road. It is one of eleven houses within the Minute Man National Historic Park that still exists today.

== History ==
The original c. 1689 home was built by Nathaniel Stow. It was on ten acres, and included a barn. Upon his death in 1724, the building passed to his son, Joseph. Joseph married Elizabeth Woolly in 1719, with whom he had four children, each of which died before the age of five. Elizabeth died in 1757, and Joseph remarried, to Olive Jones, thirty-three years his junior. They had two children, Sarah and Nathaniel. Joseph died in 1772.

The home is named for Olive Stow, a widow, and sister of Farwell Jones, who lived at the adjacent home to the east (now known as the Farwell Jones House) around the same time, in the second half of the 18th century.

The original home was rebuilt around a century later by Ebenezer Hardy. Hardy was married to Sarah Stow, daughter of Olive, who continued to live there with Hardy family. Ebenezer and Sarah had thirteen children between 1782 and 1805.

Olive died in 1811, at which point two-thirds of the home became the property of Nathaniel, who had also been living there. When Ebenezer Hardy died in 1826, his share transferred to Sarah. Their son, Isaac Hardy, went on to purchase the Stow-owned two-thirds.

The Hardy family remained owners until 1834, when the home was sold to Ephraim Meriam and Nathaniel Rice. It had seventeen owners from that point, with the last being Hagop Hovagimian, who purchased it in 1945. The property was twenty acres by that point.

When the Minute Man National Historic Park was created in 1959, eminent domain meant the government was authorized to take ownership of all of the land within the park, although this property was not transferred until 1975. Hovagimian was paid $195,000 for the property, but was allowed to live in the house for the next 25 years. The National Park Service took over the property in 2000.

=== Battles of Lexington and Concord ===
The battles of Lexington and Concord took form before dawn on April 19, 1775. Soldiers passed north of the house on their way to Concord, and again on their way back to Boston.
