= Brooks Hill =

Location involved in the American Revolutionary War

- Part of the American Revolutionary War
Date	April 19, 1775 (251 years ago)
Location	Lincoln, Massachusetts 42.4535497°N 71.307518°W

Belligerents
Massachusetts Bay	Great Britain

Commanders and leaders
Loammi Baldwin	Francis Smith
- Location within Massachusetts

Brooks Hill is a historic American Revolutionary War site associated with the revolution's first battle, the 1775 battles of Lexington and Concord. It was here, beside the Battle Road, that the British regulars passed on their marches to Concord from Boston, and again on their retreat east. It has also been referred to as Hardy's Hill.

Named for the Brooks family, today's Brooks Village Historical Area is located immediately to the north of Route 2A (the North Great Road), near Battle Road (or Bay Road), in Lincoln, Massachusetts. It is today part of Minute Man National Historical Park.

== History ==
The area was inhabited around twelve thousand years before the arrival of European immigrants. Algonquin people lived beside the Musketaquid River prior to the establishment of the Concord plantation.

== Geography ==
The summit of the hill is around 600 yards (550 m) south of Route 2A; the Historical Area, meanwhile, is located around 1 mile (1.6 km) southeast of Meriam's Corner in Concord, Massachusetts, immediately to the east (and across the Concord/Lincoln town line) of the Samuel Brooks House, on Lexington Road.

Brooks Village continues east for around 660 yards (600 m), before a steep descent into Elm Brook, which marks the starting point of Elm Brook Hill.

== April 19, 1775 ==
The British began their eighteen-mile journey back to Boston from Concord around noon. Around the same time, large numbers of colonial militia (known as minutemen) began to take their positions atop the Brooks Hill plateau. The first to arrive were 180 men from Woburn, who arrived via the meeting house in Lincoln. Major Loammi Baldwin took some respite at one of the farmhouses of the Brooks family.

As their enemies drew nearer, but possibly before any altercation at Meriam's Corner had begun, Baldwin had his soldiers move east to Elm Brook Hill. A short while later, gunfire did begin in the area between Meriam's Corner and Brook's Hill.

Two companies of minutemen and militia arrived from East Sudbury and met the British column on the southern side of the Bay Road, near its intersection with Brooks Road. When the British rearguard began to climb Brooks Hill, part of the colonists sprinted across the low open fields on the northern side of the road to position themselves near Elm Brook Hill.
