= Joshua Brooks House =

Colonial building in Massachusetts

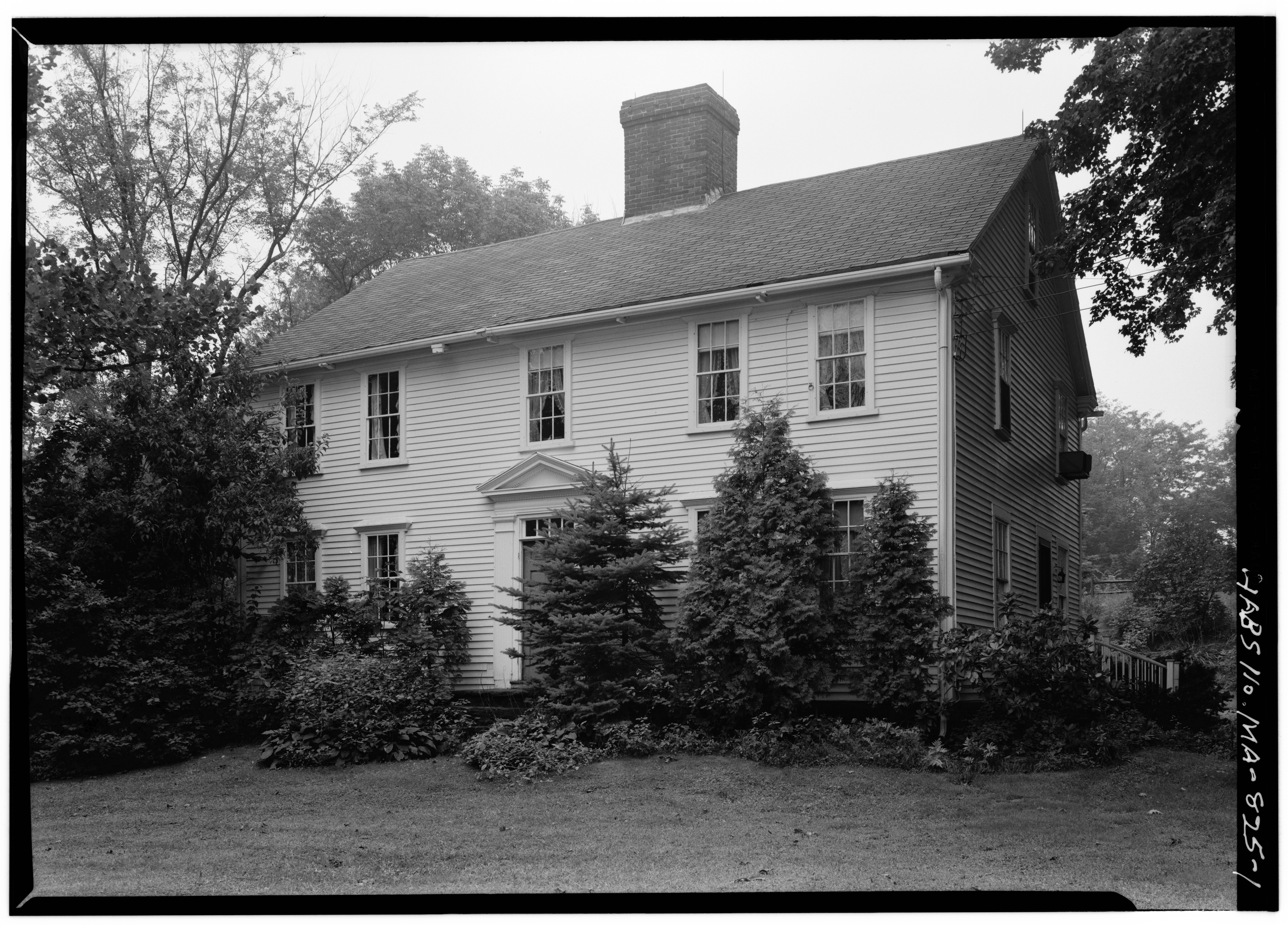
- The property in the mid-20th century
- Interactive map of the Joshua Brooks House area

General information
- Location: Lincoln, Massachusetts, North Great Road
- Coordinates: 42.45227°N 71.30486°W
- Completed: 1780 (246 years ago)

Technical details
- Floor count: 4 (including basement)

The Joshua Brooks House is a historic building on North Great Road in Lincoln, Massachusetts, just south of the former Battle Road, in an area known as Brooks Village. It is one of eleven houses within the Minute Man National Historic Park that still exists today.

== History ==
The home was built by deacon Joshua Brooks (1721–1790), who sold it to his son, Joshua Jr. (1755–1825), a member of the sixth generation of the Brooks family living in the area. He was a minuteman, and fought in the skirmish at North Bridge and was later a sergeant in the Continental Army.

Joshua Jr. had fourteen children. He died in 1825, at which point his son, Nathan (1785–1863), became the owner. The building remained in the Brooks family until 1862. The final owners prior to the National Park Service taking ownership in 1964 were Harry and Harriot Strum.
