= John Parker (captain) =

American farmer & military officer (1729–1775)

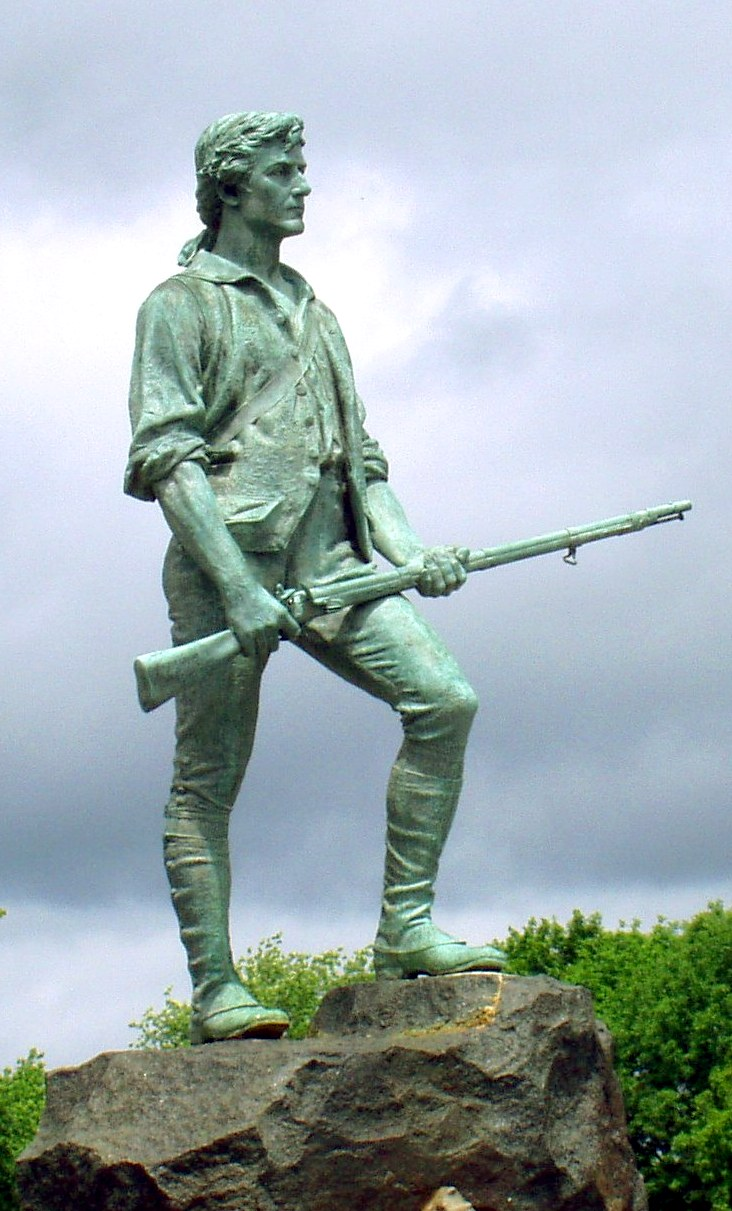
- Henry Hudson Kitson's The Lexington Minuteman statue (1900)—originally symbolizing the generic Minuteman—has come to represent Parker. It stands in Lexington Battle Green. No portrait from Parker’s life is known to exist.
- Born: July 13, 1729; Lexington, Province of Massachusetts Bay
- Died: September 17, 1775 (aged 46); Lexington, Province of Massachusetts Bay
- Military career
- Allegiance: Massachusetts Bay
- Branch: Massachusetts Militia
- Service years: 1754–1763; 1775
- Rank: Captain
- Conflicts: French and Indian War; Siege of Louisbourg; Battle of the Plains of Abraham; American Revolutionary War; Battles of Lexington and Concord; Siege of Boston
- Other work: farmer, mechanic, soldier, colonial militia officer

Captain John Parker (July 13, 1729 – September 17, 1775) was an American farmer and military officer who commanded the minutemen who fought at the Battle of Lexington on April 19, 1775.

== Early life ==
John Parker was born in Lexington, Massachusetts Bay, to Josiah Parker and Anna Stone. He was a descendant of Deacon Thomas Parker, founder of Reading, Massachusetts. John Parker was also the grandfather of reformer and abolitionist Theodore Parker. He was dying from consumption (tuberculosis), on the morning of April 19, 1775, and had not quite five months left to live.

== Battle of Lexington ==
On April 19, 1775, the British commander in Boston Thomas Gage dispatched an expedition of approximately 700 army regulars under Lieutenant Colonel Francis Smith to search the town of Concord for hidden rebel supplies and weapons caches. Lexington lay directly on the road that Smith's men took to reach Concord.

When reports of the approaching British force reached Lexington overnight, men from the town and the surrounding area began to rally on the Common. Parker's Lexington company were not minutemen, as sometimes stated, but from the main body of Massachusetts Militia. Parker was initially uncertain as to exactly what was happening. Conflicting stories arrived, and as the British regulars had spent much of the winter engaged in harmless route marches through the Massachusetts countryside, their exact intention was far from certain.

When Smith became aware that the countryside had been alarmed and that resistance might be encountered, he sent a detachment of light infantry under Major John Pitcairn ahead of the main column. Pitcairn's advance guard reached Lexington first and drew up on the Common opposite Parker's men. Parker ordered his men to disperse to avoid a confrontation, but they either failed to hear him or ignored his instructions. Shortly afterwards firing broke out despite the fact that both sides had orders not to shoot. In the following fight eight militia were killed and ten wounded while one British soldier was wounded. The lopsided casualty list led to initial reports of a massacre, stories of which spread rapidly around the colony further inflaming the situation. There remains considerable doubt as to exactly what occurred during the fight at Lexington, and a variety of different accounts emerged as to what had taken place and who had fired first. By the time Smith arrived with his main body of troops ten minutes later, he had trouble restoring order amongst his troops, who had chased fleeing militiamen into the fields around the town. Smith then decided, in spite of the fighting, to continue the march to Concord.

One of Parker's company, many years later, recalled Parker's order at Lexington Green to have been, "Stand your ground. Don't fire unless fired upon, but if they mean to have a war, let it begin here." During the skirmish, Parker witnessed his cousin Jonas Parker killed during a British bayonet charge. Later that day he rallied his men to attack the regulars returning to Boston in an ambush known as "Parker's Revenge".

== Siege of Boston and death ==
Parker and his men participated in the subsequent Siege of Boston. He was unable to serve in the Battle of Bunker Hill in June, and died of tuberculosis on September 17, 1775, aged 46.

== Legacy ==
Seal of the United States Army Reserve

Parker and his wife, Lydia (Moore) Parker had seven children: Lydia, Anna, John, Isaac, Ruth, Rebecca and Robert. The Parker homestead formerly stood on Spring Street in Lexington. A tablet marks the spot as the birthplace of a grandson, Theodore Parker, a Unitarian minister, transcendentalist and abolitionist who also donated two of Captain Parker's muskets to the state of Massachusetts; one the light musket/fowling-piece which he carried at Quebec and Lexington and a British musket that was captured at the Battle of Lexington & Concord and presented to him. They hung in the Senate Chamber of the Massachusetts State House until a 2018 renovation, and are now in a display case in a separate room.

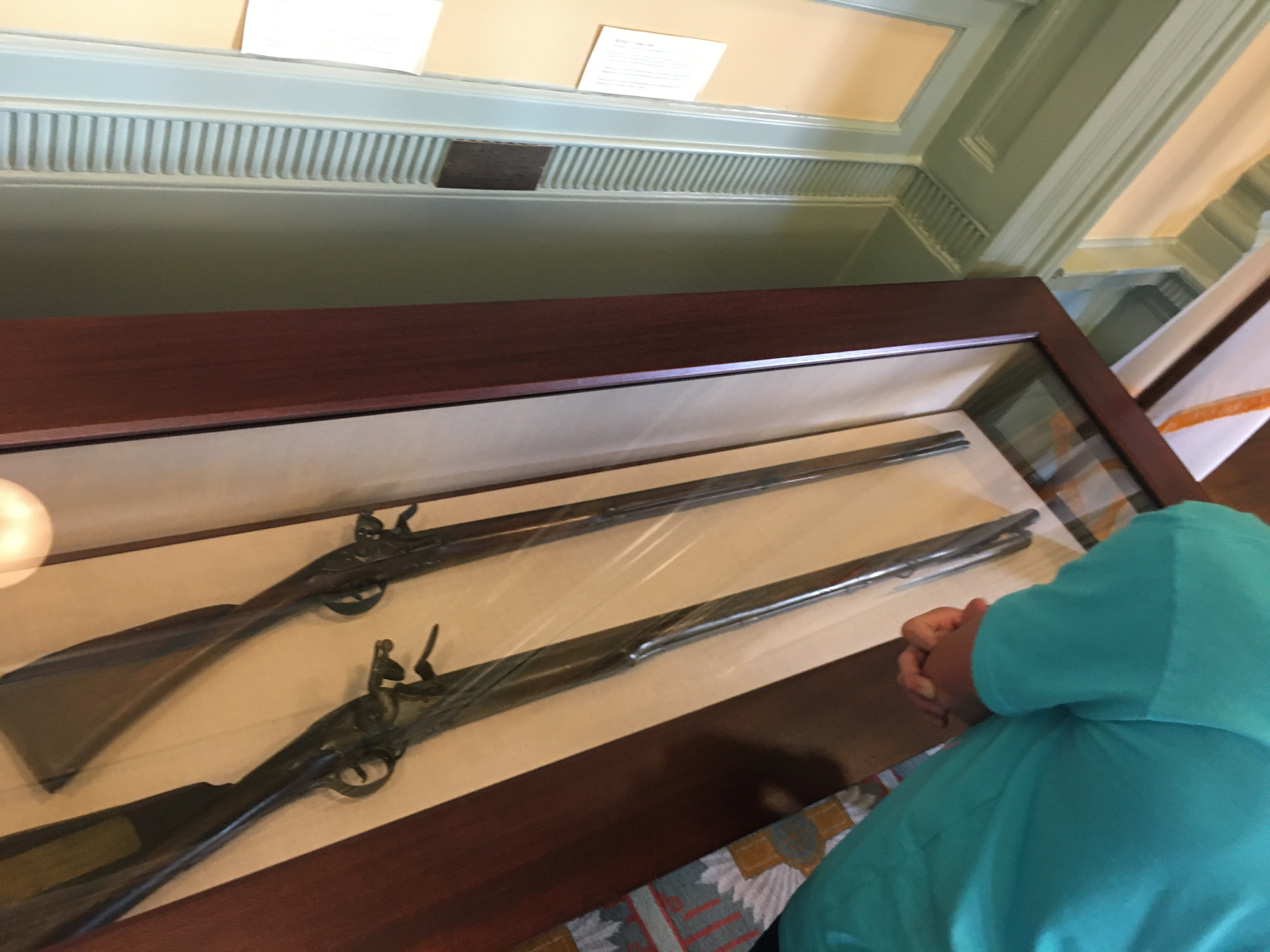
Capt. John Parker's musket, and a British musket captured at the Battle of Lexington & Concord that was presented to Capt. Parker. On display in the Massachusetts State House.

The statue known as The Lexington Minuteman (1900) was originally meant to represent the common Minuteman, but has now commonly become accepted as symbolizing Parker. It is by Henry Hudson Kitson and it stands at the town green of Lexington, Massachusetts. It was not based on Parker's appearance, as no known likenesses of him survive today and the figure is of a younger, healthy man which Parker at that point was not. One description of Parker was "a stout, large framed man, of medium height, somewhat like his illustrious grandson, Theodore Parker, in personal appearance, but had a much longer face."

The United States Army Reserve (USAR), which consists primarily of part-time duty personnel, adopted John Parker as a symbol of their motto, "Twice the Citizen". Though no image of Parker exists, the 'only official logo of the United States Army Reserve" is referred to as "The John Parker".

== Bibliography ==
- Coburn, Frank Warren (1922). The Battle of April 19, 1775 in Lexington, Concord, Lincoln, Arlington, Cambridge, Somerville and Charlestown, Massachusetts. Lexington, MA: Lexington Historical Society.
- Commager, Henry Steele (1947). Theodore Parker. Boston, Massachusetts: The Beacon Press.
- Crowder, Jack Darrell (2017). Chaplains of the Revolutionary War: Black Robed American Warriors. McFarland Publishers. ISBN 978-1-4766-7209-0.
- Fischer, David Hackett (1994). Paul Revere's Ride. New York, NY: Oxford University Press. ISBN 0-19-508847-6.
- Galvin, Gen. John R. (1989). The Minutemen - The First Fight: Myths & Realities of the American Revolution. Washington, D.C.: Pergamon-Brassey's International Defense Publishers, Inc.
- Proceedings of Lexington Historical Society and Papers Relating to the History of the Town Read by Some of the Members. Lexington, MA: Lexington Historical Society. 1890.
- Parker, Theodore (1893). Genealogy and Biographical Notes of John Parker of Lexington and his Descendants. Worcester, MA: Press of C. Hamilton. OL 23301064M.
- Tourtellot, Arthur Bernon (2000) [1959]. Lexington and Concord : the beginning of the War of the American Revolution (2000 re-issue, originally published in 1959 as William Diamond's Drum ed.). New York: W.W. Norton. ISBN 0-393-32056-1. OCLC 45157933.
