= Francis Smith (British Army officer) =

British Army officer

Major-General Francis Smith
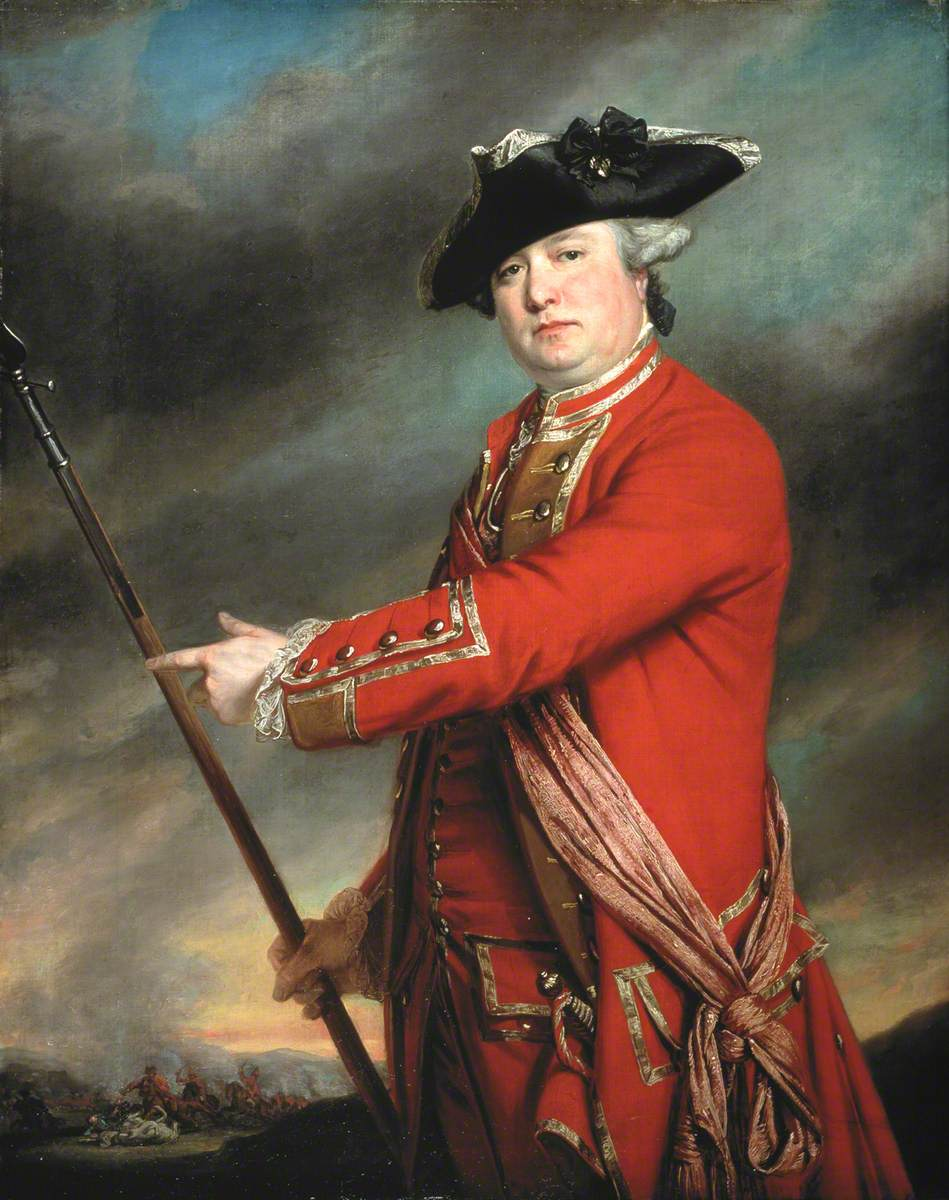
- Portrait by Francis Cotes, 1763
- Born: 1723
- Died: 7 November 1791 (aged 67–68)
- Allegiance: Great Britain
- Branch: British Army
- Rank: Major-General
- Conflicts: American War of Independence; Battles of Lexington and Concord; Siege of Boston; Battle of Long Island; Battle of Rhode Island

Major-General Francis Smith (1723 – 7 November 1791) was a British Army officer. Although Smith had a lengthy and varied career, he is best known as the British commander during most of the Battle of Lexington and Concord, Massachusetts on 19 April 1775. The fighting ignited the American War of Independence that would see thirteen of Britain's American Colonies become a separate nation.

== Lexington and Concord ==
Smith was Lieutenant Colonel of the 10th Regiment of Foot. He was given overall command of the expedition to Concord, which consisted of twenty one companies of Light infantry and grenadiers totaling around 700 men, whose orders were to search the town for contraband supplies and weapons, particularly artillery. General Thomas Gage believed that the mission required a force larger than a regiment but smaller than a brigade and so assembled it by taking individual companies from the various units in Boston. This left Smith's force lacking a proper command structure or staff.

As the crisis in Massachusetts had intensified during late 1774 and early 1775, a number of British expeditions had marched into the countryside to search towns where it was believed weapons and supplies were being stored while other units took part in a series of rapid route marches through the countryside to keep the troops physically active. Several minor confrontations and stand-offs occurred during these months, such as the Salem Incident, but had ended without bloodshed. Gage anticipated that Smith's march to Concord would be similar to these earlier expeditions and was unlikely to come under attack. The vast majority of the colony's inhabitants considered themselves loyal Britons and apart from a handful of hard-liners on both sides there was a strong desire to avoid the upheaval of civil war.

=== Lexington ===
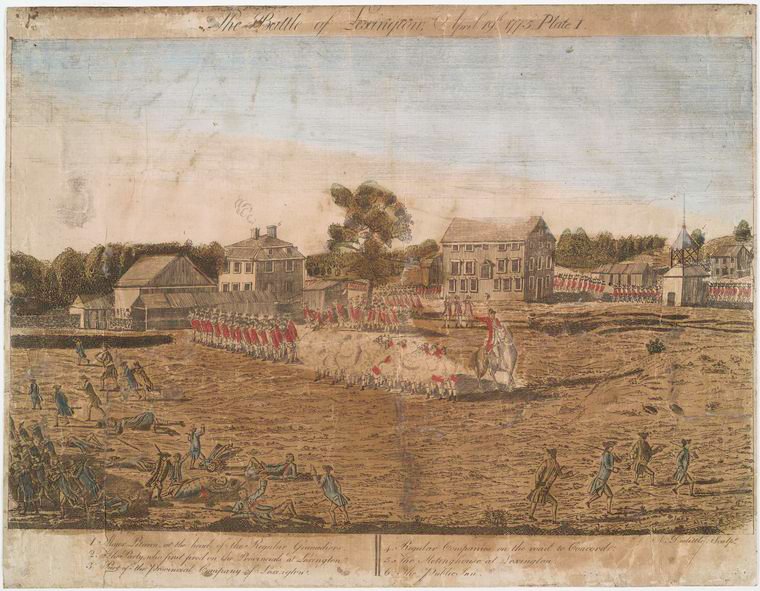
An early depiction of the first fighting at Lexington portraying it as a deliberate massacre by British troops.

Smith's departure was widely observed by Boston Whigs, and several messages were slipped out of the city to alarm the countryside. After being alerted to the possibility that there was opposition on the road, Smith ordered some light infantry to move forward while he stayed with the main body of the expedition, thus he was not present at the skirmish in Lexington. Major John Pitcairn of the Royal Marines was in charge of the advance guard. Pitcairn's men encountered a company of militiamen under John Parker on Lexington Green. Despite orders on both sides not to open fire, shooting broke out and a number of men were killed and wounded. By the time Smith arrived, his troops had scattered to pursue fleeing militiamen and it took some time for him to restore order and reform his companies. Several of his officers suggested that they should now return to Boston, but Smith decided to push on to Concord to complete the mission. He had sent messages back to Gage requesting reinforcements and informing him that the countryside was on alert.

=== Concord ===
As he marched towards Concord, Smith remained unaware how quickly the militia could assemble. Already within a five-mile radius of his force seventy-five companies of militiamen, many of them minutemen, were either mustering or marching with many others also on the move from further away. Once Smith reached Concord, he sent various troops to secure strategic points around the town. He also sent a detachment north of the Concord River to search a farm where weapons were stored, in the process of which further firing broke out at the Old North Bridge. As his troops finished searching the town, Smith managed to extricate his troops without further fighting and began the march back to Boston.

=== Withdrawal ===
His men had not gone far when firing broke out near Meriam's Corner. Smith's troops were now heavily outnumbered by the militia and for the rest of the day this imbalance grew as more and more companies of militia arrived from around the colony while Smith's men suffered from casualties as they were repeatedly ambushed along the road. Smith ordered a very fast pace for his column, reasoning that if the men slowed down they would be overwhelmed and soon run out of ammunition, supplies of which were rapidly running low. Despite his difficulties, Smith was largely able to keep his men in disciplined formations for much of the return to Lexington. More and more of Smith's officers were killed or wounded, hampering his attempts to maintain control, and his men finally lost unit cohesion and hurried onward in a general mass.

Not far west of Lexington, Smith was wounded in the thigh in an ambush by Lexington militia, led by John Parker in what has been called "Parker's Revenge". Smith gave up his horse so that more badly wounded men could use it. His column was extremely hard-pressed and close to total collapse but managed to reach the comparative safety of Lexington where a brigade of British reinforcements under General Percy had arrived. Percy took command and his reinforcements became the rear guard and the flankers of the expedition while Smith's tired troops became the advance guard. In Menotomy, they came under further attack from freshly-arrived militiamen and had to clear several houses in further heavy fighting. It was not until Smith's men reached Charlestown, that the threat of attack ended.

Militia from across New England had been alerted of the fighting at Lexington and Concord, but poured in too late to take part in the battle. They assembled outside Boston and blockaded the city, severing its land but not its sea connections. Although many were not initially aware of it, the sporadic fighting had triggered the outbreak of the American War of Independence and the civil war which many on both sides had warned of and tried to avoid.

== Siege of Boston ==
Smith's conduct was highly praised by Gage in his dispatches to London reporting the outbreak of fighting. He was promoted to full colonel at the year's end and later promoted to brigadier general. On the night of 4 March 1776, during a snow storm, British sentries on duty near the Boston Neck heard digging across the bay on Dorchester Heights. This was reported to Smith, who did not report this to his own superiors at the Province House. By dawn on 5 March, the Americans now had a full breastworks constructed on the heights. This resulted in the British choosing to evacuate Boston and sail to Halifax, Nova Scotia.

== New York and Rhode Island ==
When General William Howe and the British Army sailed to New York in August, Smith commanded a brigade during the British victory at the Battle of Long Island. In August 1778, he led the brigade at Quaker Hill in Newport, Rhode Island during the Battle of Rhode Island. The 10th Regiment served in America until 1778 and then returned to England after 19 years service overseas. Smith returned to America in 1779 and was promoted to major general. His son Robert Smith became Minister of War under King George.

== Legacy ==
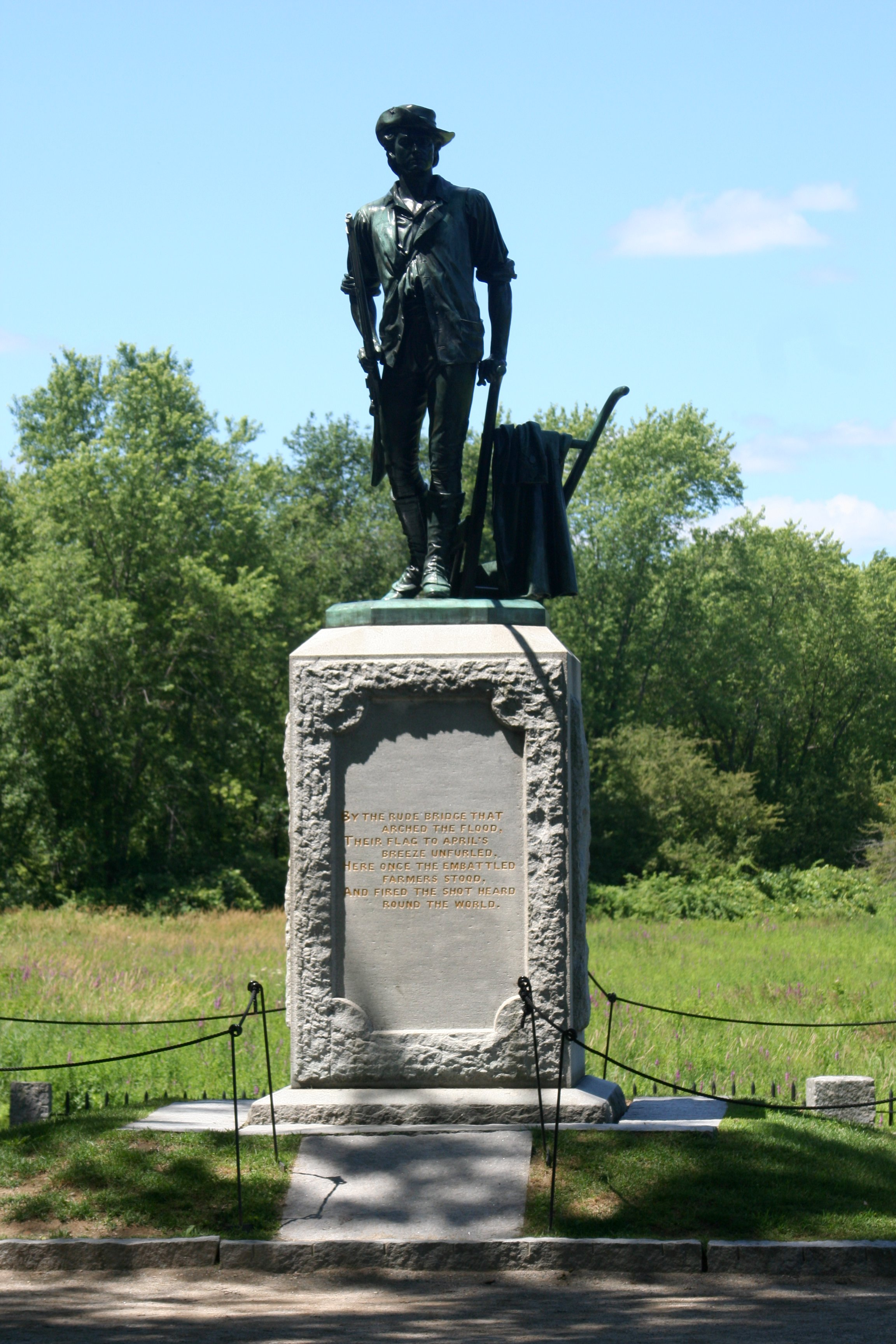
There are numerous monuments commemorating the events of 19 April 1775. This one is located at the Old North Bridge, Concord.

Smith is largely remembered for his role in the fighting at Lexington and Concord. Perceptions of him have altered over time as the battles have been re-examined – moving away from initial portrayals that tended to paint him and his officers having deliberately set out with the intention of killing colonial militia. While the first reports of the fight were the catalyst for the outbreak of the war, tipping a number of colonies into open rebellion, its importance as a historical event only really grew in significance in the century after American independence was granted by the 1783 Peace of Paris.

The narrative of the fight on Lexington Green gradually changed from one of an unprovoked massacre of loyal citizens by regulars, into a more even-handed and inevitable clash between the two forces which was the inescapable consequence of an American desire for nationhood. This new perception, which reached its height in the late nineteenth century, came from a changing desire in the United States to present a more self-confident creation of the country. Since the Second World War, many accounts have disregarded this interpretation, and emphasized the more ambiguous nature of the situation in Massachusetts in Spring 1775 when the colonists still considered themselves British and very few advocated outright independence. More recent studies have often focused on the hesitation of both regular and militia officers to open fire, and the clear orders put out by both sides to avoid engagements.

Considerable confusion still remains about what exactly happened at Lexington Green when the British regulars and militiamen drew up opposite each other with a number of different versions of who fired the first shot advanced by various accounts and historians. Whoever fired first, Smith and Pitcairn have generally been criticized for poor handling of their troops.

While Smith has often been attacked for his decisions, he has also been praised for bringing his column through repeated ambushes during the retreat from Concord to the safety of Percy's reinforcements without entirely disintegrating. John Galvin, who wrote a history of the Lexington and Concord fighting, observed that "Smith, unfortunately, could match this steadiness with an equal slowness and lack of imagination, a fact that has received more than enough attention over the years, perhaps obscuring his coolness and courage".

== Bibliography ==
- Galvin, John R. The Minute Men. The First Fight: Myths and Realities of the American Revolution. Potomac Books, 2006.

Military offices
Preceded by William Ashe-à Court	Colonel of the 11th (the North Devonshire) Regiment of Foot; 1781–1791	Succeeded by James Grant
