= William Dawes =

American militiaman (1745–1799)

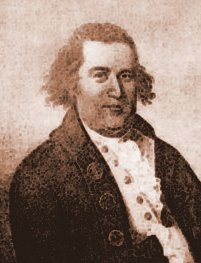
- Born: April 6, 1745; Boston, Province of Massachusetts Bay
- Died: February 25, 1799 (aged 53); Marlborough, Massachusetts, U.S.
- Occupation: Tanner
- Spouse(s): Mehitable May (m. 1768; died 1793); Lydia Gendall (m. ca. 1796; died ca. 1809)
- Children: 3 with Mehitable May; 1 with Lydia Gendall

William Dawes Jr. (April 6, 1745 – February 25, 1799) was an soldier, and was one of several men who, in April 1775, alerted minutemen in Massachusetts of the approach of British regulars prior to the Battles of Lexington and Concord at the outset of the American Revolution. Dawes' role in this action – as well of that of Samuel Prescott – has long been overshadowed by the attention given to Paul Revere.

== Childhood ==
Dawes was born in Boston, Province of Massachusetts Bay, on April 6, 1745, to William and Lydia Dawes (née Boone), and baptized at Boston's Old South Church. He became a tanner and was active in Boston's militia. On May 3, 1768, Dawes married Mehitable May, the daughter of Samuel and Catherine May (née Mears). The Boston Gazette noted that for his wedding, he wore a suit entirely made in North America. At the time, Whigs were trying to organize a boycott of British-made products in order to pressure the Parliament of Great Britain into repealing the Townshend Acts.

== Role in Boston's militia ==
On April 8, 1768, Dawes was elected as a member of the Ancient and Honorable Artillery Company of Massachusetts. He was appointed as the company's second sergeant in 1770. When the company was revived in 1786, after becoming dormant during the American Revolution, he was appointed as the Company clerk. His father, William Dawes Sr., was also a member of the company. It is likely that in September 1774, Dawes was instrumental in helping Boston's militia artillery company secure its four small cannons from being confiscated by the British. The Massachusetts Provincial Congress certainly sent word to him in February 1775 that it was time to move two of those weapons out of Boston.

On another occasion, Dawes and some others stole two cannons which were in a building that was under guard by a British grenadier at the time. They snuck the cannons out through a window in the back of the building then hid them in a woodbox in a schoolhouse next door for retrieval later. Upon discovery of the loss, the British authorities closely questioned the schoolmaster, who coolly denied any knowledge of the affair, while keeping his feet casually propped up on the woodbox. Dawes hurt his wrist in the escapade, and some days later, went to a fellow member of the Sons of Liberty, Dr. Joseph Warren, for treatment. Warren asked Dawes how he hurt himself. Dawes demurred, and Warren (who probably knew about the cannon incident) wisely responded by saying that it was best that he did not know.

=== Midnight ride ===
Dawes, who was known and trusted by Sons of Liberty leader Dr. Joseph Warren, was assigned by Warren to ride from Boston to Lexington, Massachusetts, on the night of April 18, 1775, when it became clear that a British column was going to march into the countryside. Dawes' mission was to warn John Hancock and Samuel Adams that they were in danger of arrest. Dawes took the land route out of Boston through the Boston Neck, leaving just before the British sealed off the town.

Also acting under Dr. Warren, Paul Revere arranged for another rider waiting across the Charles River in Charlestown to be told of the army's route with lanterns hung in Old North Church. To be certain the message would get through, Revere rowed across the river and started riding westward himself. Later, Henry Wadsworth Longfellow's historically inaccurate poem "Paul Revere's Ride" would focus entirely on Revere, making him a composite of the many alarm riders that night.

Dawes and Revere arrived at the Hancock–Clarke House in Lexington about the same time, shortly after midnight. Revere arrived slightly earlier, despite having stopped to speak to militia officers in towns along the way, as his route was shorter and his horse faster. After warning Adams and Hancock to leave, Revere and Dawes proceeded to Concord in case that was the British column's goal. Revere no doubt knew that the Provincial Congress had stored munitions there, including the cannons which Dawes had helped to secure. Along the way, the two men met Samuel Prescott, a local young physician, who joined them.

A squad of mounted British officers awaited on the road between Lexington and Concord. They had already arrested some riders heading west with news of the troops, and they called for Dawes, Revere, and Prescott to halt. The three men rode in different directions, hoping one would escape. Dawes, according to the story he told his children, rode into the yard of a house shouting that he had lured two officers there. Fearing an ambush, the officers stopped chasing him. Dawes's horse bucked him off, however, and he had to walk back to Lexington. He later said that in the morning, he returned to the same yard and found the watch that had fallen from his pocket. Otherwise, Dawes's activity during the Battle of Lexington and Concord remains unknown.

Dawes and his companions' warnings allowed the town militias to muster a sufficient force for the first open battle of the American Revolutionary War and the first colonial victory. The British column did not find most of the weapons they had marched to destroy and sustained serious losses during their retreat to Boston while under attack by the minutemen.

=== Service in the American Revolution ===
On September 9, 1776, Dawes was commissioned second major of the Boston militia regiment. During the war, Dawes worked as a quartermaster in central Massachusetts. British prisoners of war from the Battles of Saratoga complained to Parliament that he gave them short supplies; his family countered that Dawes believed that they were stealing from farmers while being marched to Boston – as most armies on the march were prone to do.

== Later life and death ==
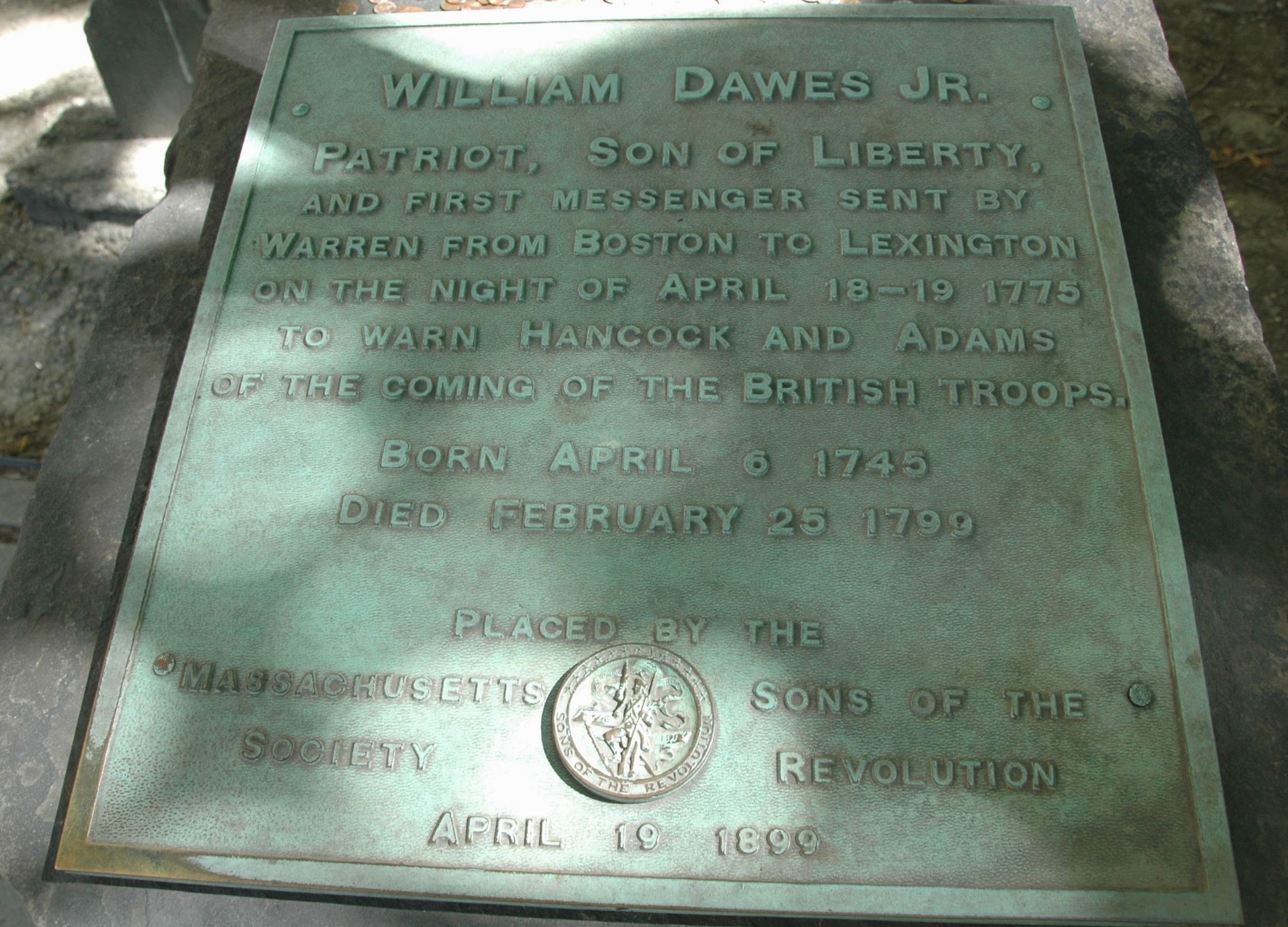
William Dawes tomb marker in King's Chapel Burying Ground

Mehitable died on May 19, 1794, leaving behind three children. In 1796, Dawes remarried to Lydia Gendall. Dawes and Lydia had one child together, named Mehitable May Dawes.

Dawes died in Marlborough, Massachusetts, on February 25, 1799. He was believed to have been buried in the King's Chapel Burying Ground, but modern research points to his resting place now being in his first wife's family plot in Forest Hills Cemetery in Jamaica Plain.

== Legacy ==
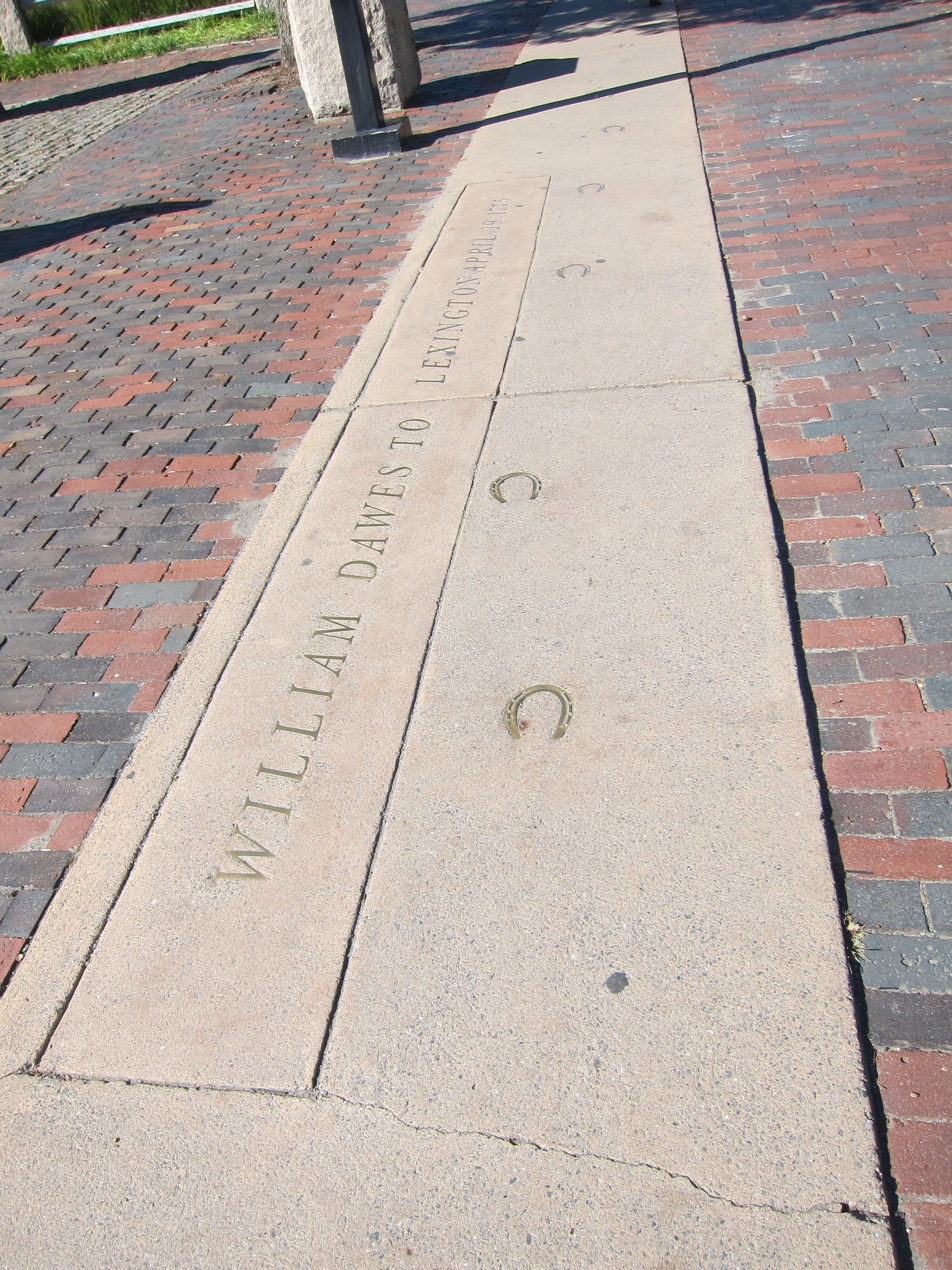
Memorial: William Dawes to Lexington. Location: Harvard Square, Cambridge, Massachusetts

The poem by Henry Wadsworth Longfellow, "Paul Revere's Ride", has been criticized by modern historians for overstating the role of Revere in the night's events. Revere's may have been a better story, but Dawes and Prescott were more successful in achieving their missions. In 1896 Helen F. Moore, dismayed that William Dawes had been forgotten, penned a parody of Longfellow's poem.

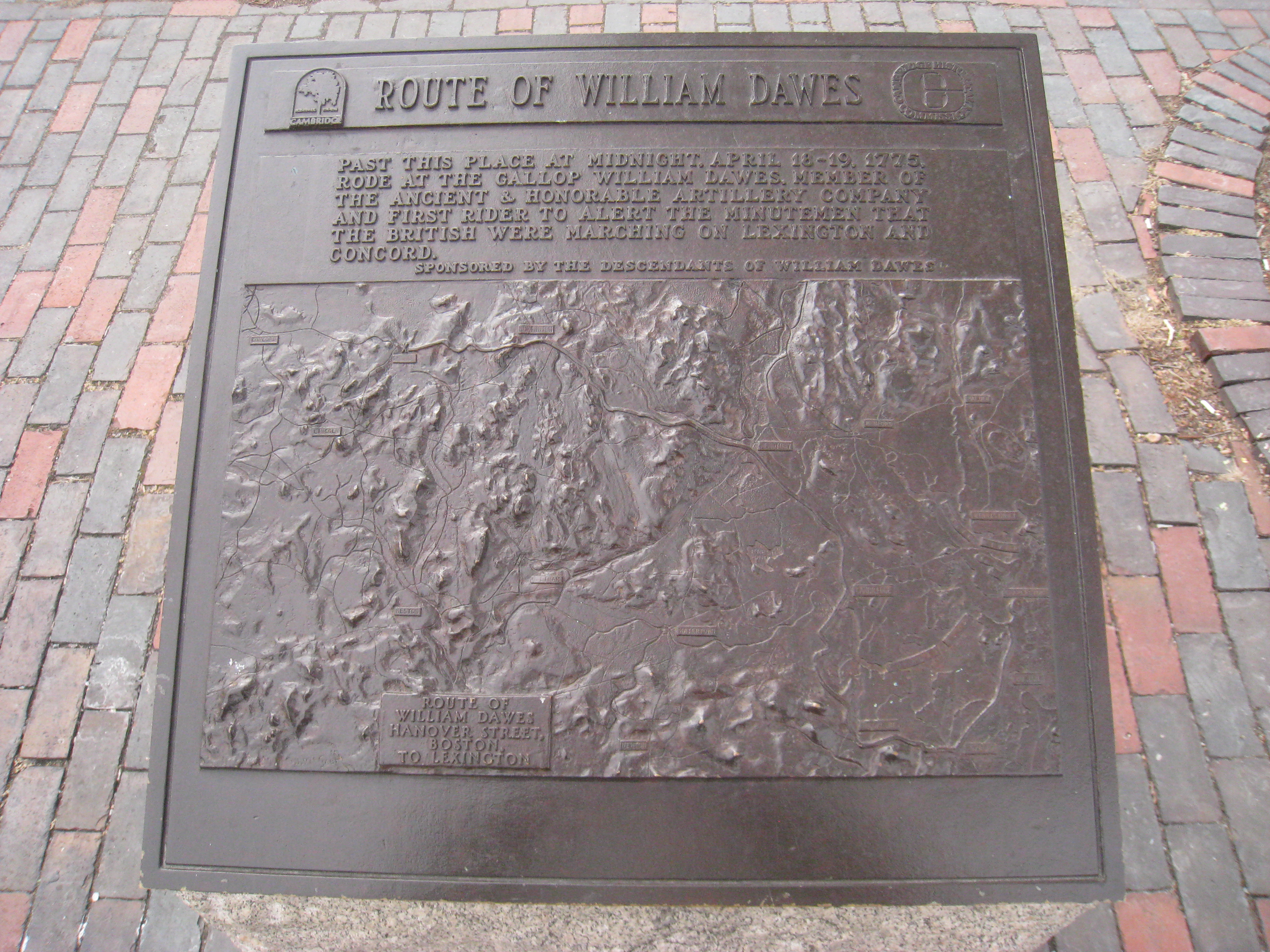
William Dawes plaque showing the route of his ride

The difference in Revere's and Dawes's achievement and legacy is examined by Canadian journalist Malcolm Gladwell in his book The Tipping Point, where he concludes that Revere would be classified as a connector whereas Dawes was an "ordinary man."

Dawes's ride is commemorated on a traffic island in Cambridge, Massachusetts, heavily travelled by pedestrians, at the intersection of Garden Street and Massachusetts Avenue in Harvard Square, and known as Dawes Island. Dawes's passage through the area is represented by bronze horseshoes embedded in the sidewalk, as hoofprints, accompanied by an inscription giving his name and the date (inaccurately stated as April 19, 1775), and by historical displays.

=== Descendants ===
William Dawes' great-grandson, Rufus Dawes, was a Civil War military officer and congressman; Rufus Dawes' children included Charles G. Dawes, who served as Vice President of the United States under Calvin Coolidge, Rufus C. Dawes, a businessman, Beman Gates Dawes, a businessman and congressman, and Henry M. Dawes, a businessman and banker. A brother of Congressman Rufus Dawes was Major Ephraim C. Dawes. Television personality Bill Schulz (William Dawes Schulz) is another descendant of Dawes, as the grandson of Henry M. Dawes' daughter Mary.

William Dawes was also a first cousin of Thomas Dawes, who was a Revolutionary War colonel, a noted architect/builder, and held numerous government positions; another cousin twice removed was Congressman Henry L. Dawes (1812–1903).

== See also ==
- The Charles G. Dawes House has portraits of William Dawes and his wife, Mehitable May, in its collection.
- The Dawes Arboretum also has a portrait of William Dawes in its collection.
- Israel Bissell
- Sybil Ludington
