= John Robinson (militiaman) =

American soldier (1735–1805)

- Born: July 24, 1735; Topsfield, Massachusetts Bay
- Died: June 13, 1805 (aged 69); Westford, Massachusetts, US
- Military career
- Allegiance: Massachusetts Provincial Congress
- Branch: Massachusetts Militia
- Service years: 1775–1776
- Rank: Colonel
- Conflicts: American Revolutionary War; Battle of Concord; Battle of Bunker Hill; Siege of Boston; Shays' Rebellion

John Robinson (July 24, 1735 – June 13, 1805) was a Massachusetts militia and Continental Army officer from Westford, Massachusetts during the American Revolutionary War. On April 19, 1775, during the Battle of Concord, Robinson was the second highest-ranking officer in the field after Colonel James Barrett. Robinson marched next to Major John Buttrick at the head of the American column which advanced on and defeated the British Regulars at the Old North Bridge that day. Robinson would later fight at the Battle of Bunker Hill, serve under General George Washington during the Siege of Boston and, in 1786, he would take part in the agrarian insurrection known as Shays' Rebellion.

== Early life ==
Robinson was born in Topsfield, Province of Massachusetts, in 1735. At age 29 he married Miss Huldah Perley of Boxford, Massachusetts, the niece of French and Indian War Major General Israel Putnam of Pomfret, Connecticut.

Soon after migrating from Topsfield to Westford in search of open farmland, Robinson was appointed to the rank of lieutenant colonel, or second in command of the Minuteman regiment commanded by Col. William Prescott of Pepperell, Massachusetts.

== Lexington and Concord ==
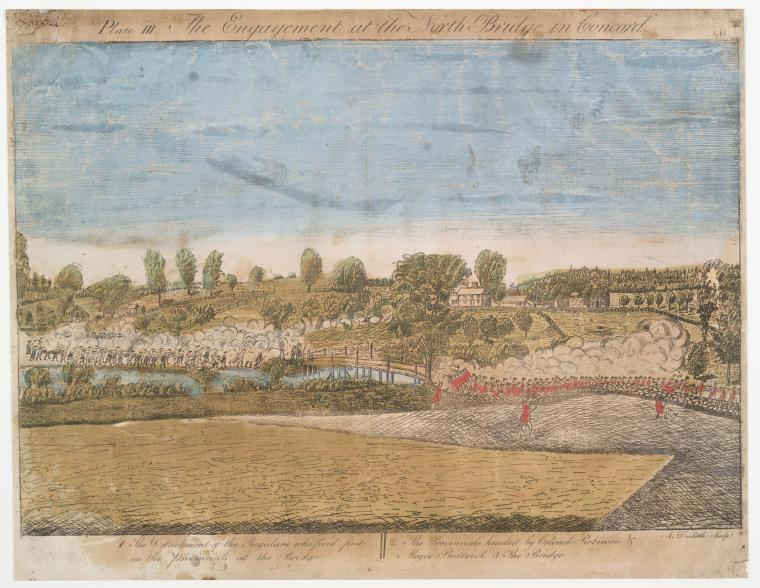
One of four iconic engraving prints Amos Doolittle produced in the aftermath of Concord and Lexington, Plate III depicts the battle at the North Bridge in Concord.

The exact manner in which Robinson was alarmed on the early morning of April 19, 1775 has been lost to history. Most documents relay the story of an unknown, lone alarm rider rousing the officer and his family in the dead of night. However, historian David Hackett Fischer asserts that the township as a whole was alerted by the firing of an alarm signal from the nearby village of Carlisle, a Northern precinct of Concord, thereby creating a more general internal alarm throughout the vicinity. Regardless, once roused, Robinson moved in haste to join his fellow Minutemen. Robinson, Rev. Joseph Thaxter, and a handful of Westford Minutemen rode on horseback and arrived at Concord in time to participate in the engagement at the Old North Bridge.

Robinson and his companions, having traveled by horse, arrived before the companies of Westford militia and minutemen who traveled on foot. Only a very small number of Robinson's regiment were present as the Americans prepared to attack the small British force holding the Old North Bridge. The militia and minutemen present at that time were almost entirely of Col. James Barrett's regiment of Middlesex militia and Col. Abijah Pierce's regiment of Middlesex minutemen. As he had no command present on the field, Robinson requested permission from Major John Buttrick (who had been designated second in command by Barrett and charged with leading the advance) to march at the head of the American column at Buttrick's side. Recognizing Robinson's superior rank, Buttrick offered command of the column to Robinson, despite the fact that it was not Robinson's regiment. Robinson declined and asked to accompany Buttrick as a volunteer.

Buttrick and Robinson led the column, side by side, from a hill near Buttrick's farm down to the North Bridge. The first shot fired by the Regulars splashed into the Concord River, fired either accidentally or as a warning to the oncoming Americans. The British then fired several more shots, killing Captain Isaac Davis of Acton who commanded the leading company in the American column. Another of these shots sent a ball through Robinson's coat, just under the arm, severely wounding an Acton volunteer behind Robinson. Buttrick gave the command to commence fire, resulting in 12 British casualties (three of them fatal). The British retreated almost immediately after the Americans opened fire.

== Battle of Bunker Hill ==
Robinson fought from the redoubt on Breed's Hill under the command of Col. William Prescott of Pepperell, Massachusetts. His bravery and valor in outflanking a charge of British regulars along a low fence on Breed's Hill was noted by Prescott in an August 25, 1775 letter to Continental Congressman John Adams. "I commanded my Lieut Coll. Robinson...with a detachment to flank the enemy" Prescott related, "who I have reason to think behaved with prudence and courage."

== Service at Cambridge ==
Col. Robinson commanded a regiment of over 400 militiamen at Cambridge under the authority of General George Washington during the Siege of Boston from late 1775 to March 23, 1776. His official tenure ended soon after Henry Knox's famous display of captured Fort Ticonderoga artillery brought to a close the British occupation of Boston and forced the wholesale evacuation of Royal forces from the colony. However, the mirth of the Royal retreat was short lived for the Robinson family. The unsanitary conditions of Cambridge camp life brought about a scourge of diseases which were quickly spread throughout New England by the returning soldiers. Almost immediately, these diseases were to have devastating effects on both soldier and citizen alike. In a period of less than two weeks, between the days of August, 30 and September 9, 1775, three of John Robinson's daughters, all under the age of ten, would perish from camp fever.

== Shays' Rebellion ==
In 1786, Robinson took up arms against the Massachusetts Courts in the post-war farmer's revolt later known as Shays' Rebellion. Little is known of his actual role in the rebellion, his great-Granddaughter Olive Ann Prescott, describing his action as "an honest mistake" yet noting that he always had fought "with an innate hatred of injustice wherever found". It is known that he acted in concert with Job Shattuck of neighboring Groton, MA, a notable leader in the uprising who Robinson had commanded in Prescott's militia and at the Regimental camp at Cambridge. On September 12, the day on which the Middlesex County Court in Concord was forced to adjourn by an armed mob of Shaysites, "The number at 11 o’clock was about seventy, but increased in the afternoon to about two hundred and fifty, by the arrival of others from Worcester county; and from other towns in Middlesex, among whom Col. Robinson of Westford was conspicuous."

== Legacy ==
The Col. John Robinson elementary school in Westford, Massachusetts is named in his honor, as is the Col. John Robinson chapter of the Daughters of the American Revolution of Westford, Massachusetts. Robinson Rd. in Westford is also named in his honor. There is a small memorial on Westford Town Common with a plaque commemorating his service and the "All War Monument" at the head of the Westford Town Common also mentions his service during the revolutionary war. A memorial plaque is placed at the entrance to the Westlawn Cemetery on Concord Road in Westford, where Robinson is buried, put there by the Daughters of the American Revolution.
