= Battles of Lexington and Concord =

1775 battle of the American Revolutionary War

- Part of the Boston campaign of the American Revolutionary War
- 1985 painting of the initial firefight at Lexington
Date	April 19, 1775 (251 years ago)
Location	Middlesex County, Province of Massachusetts Bay, British America Lexington: 42°26′58″N 71°13′51″W; Concord: 42°28′09″N 71°21′01″W
Result	American victory

Belligerents
Massachusetts Bay	Great Britain

Commanders and leaders
John Parker; James Barrett; John Buttrick; John Robinson; William Heath; Joseph Warren; Isaac Davis †	Francis Smith; John Pitcairn (WIA); Hugh Percy

Strength
Lexington: 77; Concord: 400; End of Battle: 3,960	Departing Boston: 700; Lexington: 400; Concord: 100; End of Battle: 1,500

Casualties and losses
49 killed 39 wounded 5 missing	73 killed 174 wounded 53 missing

The Battles of Lexington and Concord on April 19, 1775, were the first major military actions between the British Army and Patriot militias from British America's Thirteen Colonies during the American Revolutionary War. The opposing forces fought day-long running battles in Middlesex County in the Province of Massachusetts Bay, in the towns of Lexington, Concord, Lincoln, Menotomy (present-day Arlington), and Cambridge.

After the Boston Tea Party (1773), the British Parliament passed the Intolerable Acts (early 1774), including the restrictive Massachusetts Government Act. Patriot (Colonial) leaders in Suffolk County, Massachusetts, adopted the Suffolk Resolves in resistance to the acts. The leaders formed a Patriot provisional government, the Massachusetts Provincial Congress, and called for local militias to train for possible hostilities. The Provincial Congress effectively controlled the colony outside of Boston. On September 17, the First Continental Congress endorsed the Suffolk Resolves. In response, in February 1775, the British government declared Massachusetts to be in a state of rebellion.

On April 18, 1775, about 700 British Regulars in Boston, under Lieutenant Colonel Francis Smith, received secret orders to capture and destroy colonial military supplies reportedly stored at Concord. Through effective intelligence gathering, Patriot leaders received word weeks before the British expedition that their supplies might be at risk and had moved most of them to other locations. On the night before the battles, several riders, including Paul Revere, William Dawes and Samuel Prescott, warned area militias of the British plans and approaching British Army expedition from Boston.

The first shots between Patriot militiamen and Regulars at Lexington were fired at sunrise on April 19. Eight militiamen were killed and ten wounded. Only one British soldier was wounded. The outnumbered militia quickly fell back and the Regulars proceeded to Concord, where they split into companies to search for supplies. At the Old North Bridge in Concord, approximately 400 militiamen engaged 100 Regulars at about 11:00 am, resulting in casualties on both sides. The outnumbered Regulars fell back and rejoined the main body of British troops in Concord.

Then the British forces began a return march to Boston after a mostly unsuccessful search for military supplies. Meanwhile, more militiamen from neighboring towns arrived along the return route. The two forces exchanged gunfire at many places along the march throughout the day. Lieutenant Colonel Smith's troops were reinforced by Brigadier General Earl Percy's force at Lexington at a crucial time during their return. The combined British force of about 1,700 men returned to Boston under heavy fire and eventually reached the safety of Charlestown after incurring heavy losses. The militias then blockaded the narrow land accesses to Charlestown and Boston, starting the siege of Boston.

== Background ==
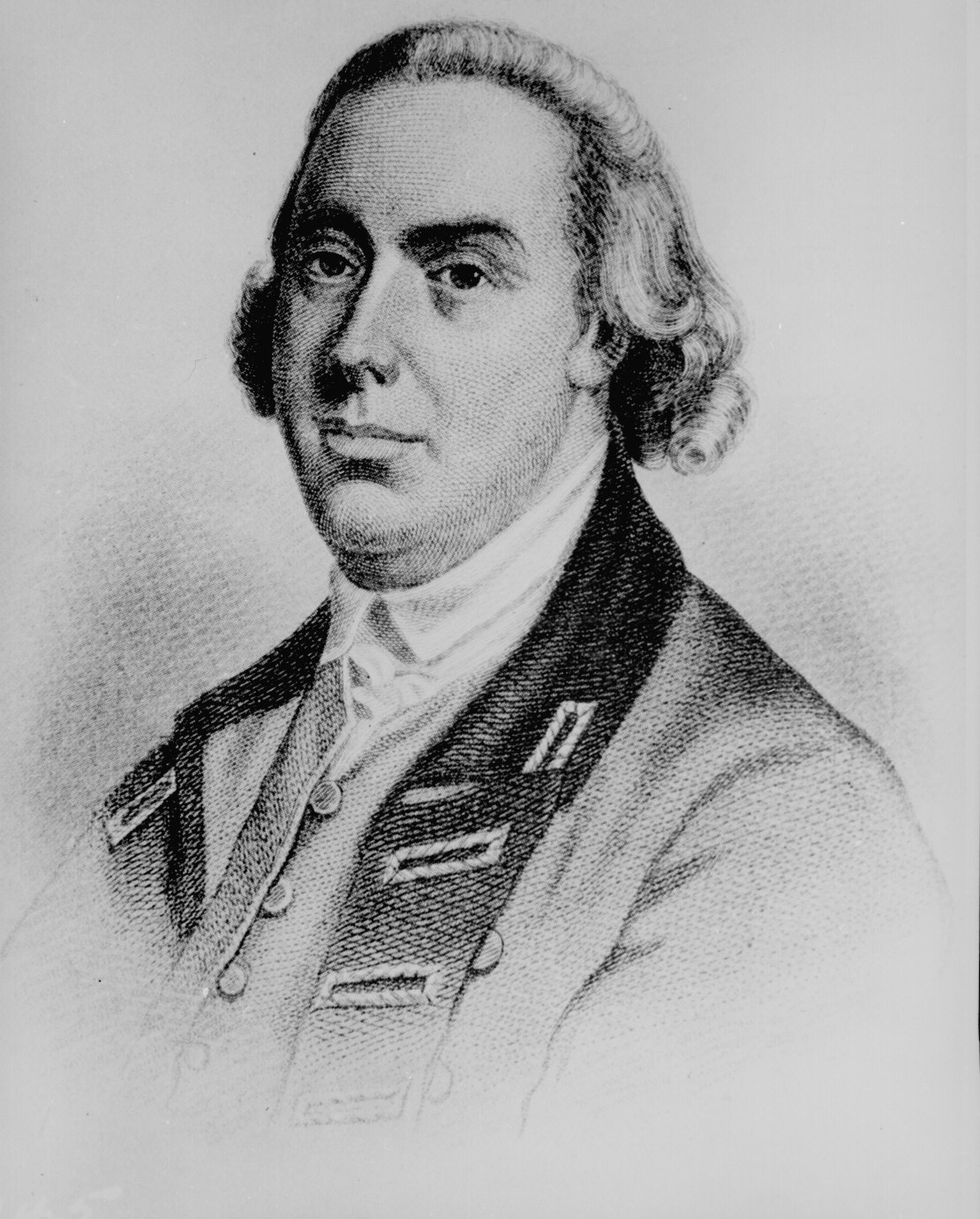
Thomas Gage

The British Army occupied Boston in 1768. Royal Navy units and Royal Marines were added to enforce the Coercive Acts of 1774, as colonists named them (later renamed by historians the Intolerable Acts). The British Parliament enacted these measures to punish the Province of Massachusetts Bay for the Boston Tea Party and other acts of protest. In response, in the summer 1774, colonial leaders in Suffolk County, Massachusetts adopted the Suffolk Resolves declaring the Coercive Acts unconstitutional, recommending sanctions against Britain, urging Massachusetts residents to form their own government and to fight in its defense. The First Continental Congress endorsed the Resolves on September 17, 1774. General Thomas Gage, the military governor of Massachusetts, effectively dissolved the existing provincial government pursuant to the Massachusetts Government Act. Then, in line with the Suffolk Resolves, the colonists formed the Massachusetts Provincial Congress.

Gage also was commander-in-chief of the roughly 3,000 British military men garrisoned in Boston. He lost control over Massachusetts outside of Boston due to the colonial resistance where the Patriot Whigs were a majority and the pro-British Tories were a minority. Gage planned to avoid open conflict with the Patriots by removing military supplies from Patriot militias outside Boston through use of small, secret, and rapid military strikes. In one such strike, the British seized supplies but the Patriots succeeded in hiding supplies from other searches in a series of nearly bloodless events known as the Powder Alarms.

Colonial militias were formed from the beginning of colonial settlements to defend against Indian attacks. These forces also saw action in the French and Indian War between 1754 and 1763 while fighting alongside the British. Under New England colonies' laws, towns were required to form militia companies of all males 16 years of age and older (exemptions existed) and to ensure that the members were properly armed. Massachusetts militias operated under the jurisdiction of the provincial government but militia companies elected their own officers, as they did throughout New England.

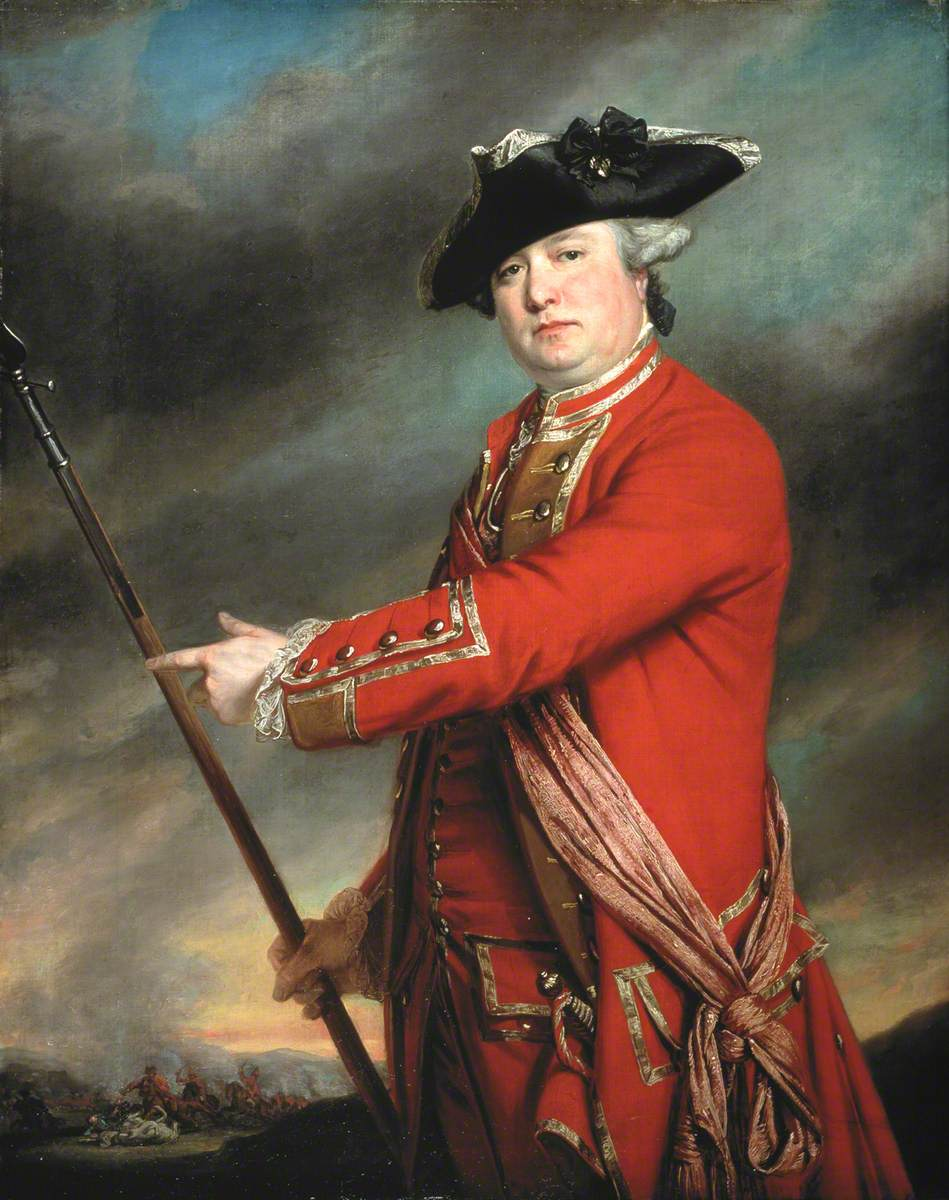
Francis Smith, commander of the military expedition, in a 1763 portrait

In a February 1775 address to King George III, both houses of Parliament declared that a state of rebellion existed in the Province of Massachusetts Bay. Parliament reported that some of the Massachusetts subjects had encouraged unlawful combinations and engagements in other colonies. They noted that these rebellious actions were unnecessary because Parliament would pay attention to any "real grievances" of the colonists (without further explanation). Parliament requested the king to enforce obedience to the law and authority of Parliament and the king.

=== British preparations ===
On April 14, 1775, Gage received instructions from Secretary of State William Legge, Earl of Dartmouth, to disarm the rebels and to imprison their leaders. Gage's decision to act promptly may have been influenced by the information he received on April 15 from an unidentified spy in the Massachusetts Provincial Congress, who told Gage that Congress was divided on the need for armed resistance. He also advised that the Congress had sent delegates to other New England colonies asking for cooperation in raising a New England army of 18,000 soldiers.

On the morning of April 18, Gage ordered a mounted patrol of about 20 men under the command of Major Mitchell of the 5th Regiment of Foot into the surrounding country to intercept messengers who might be out on horseback. This patrol behaved differently from past patrols out of Boston, staying out after dark and asking travelers about the location of Samuel Adams and John Hancock. This had the unintended effect of alarming many residents and increasing their preparedness. The Lexington militia, in particular, began to muster early that evening, hours before receiving word directly from Boston.

British Lieutenant Colonel Francis Smith received orders from Gage on the afternoon of April 18 that he was not to read until his troops were underway instructing him to conduct an expedition. Gage told Smith to proceed quickly and secretly from Boston to Concord, seize and destroy all military supplies there but to take care that soldiers not plunder or damage private property. Gage decided not to issue written orders for the arrest of rebel leaders, fearing that might spark an uprising.

=== American preparations ===
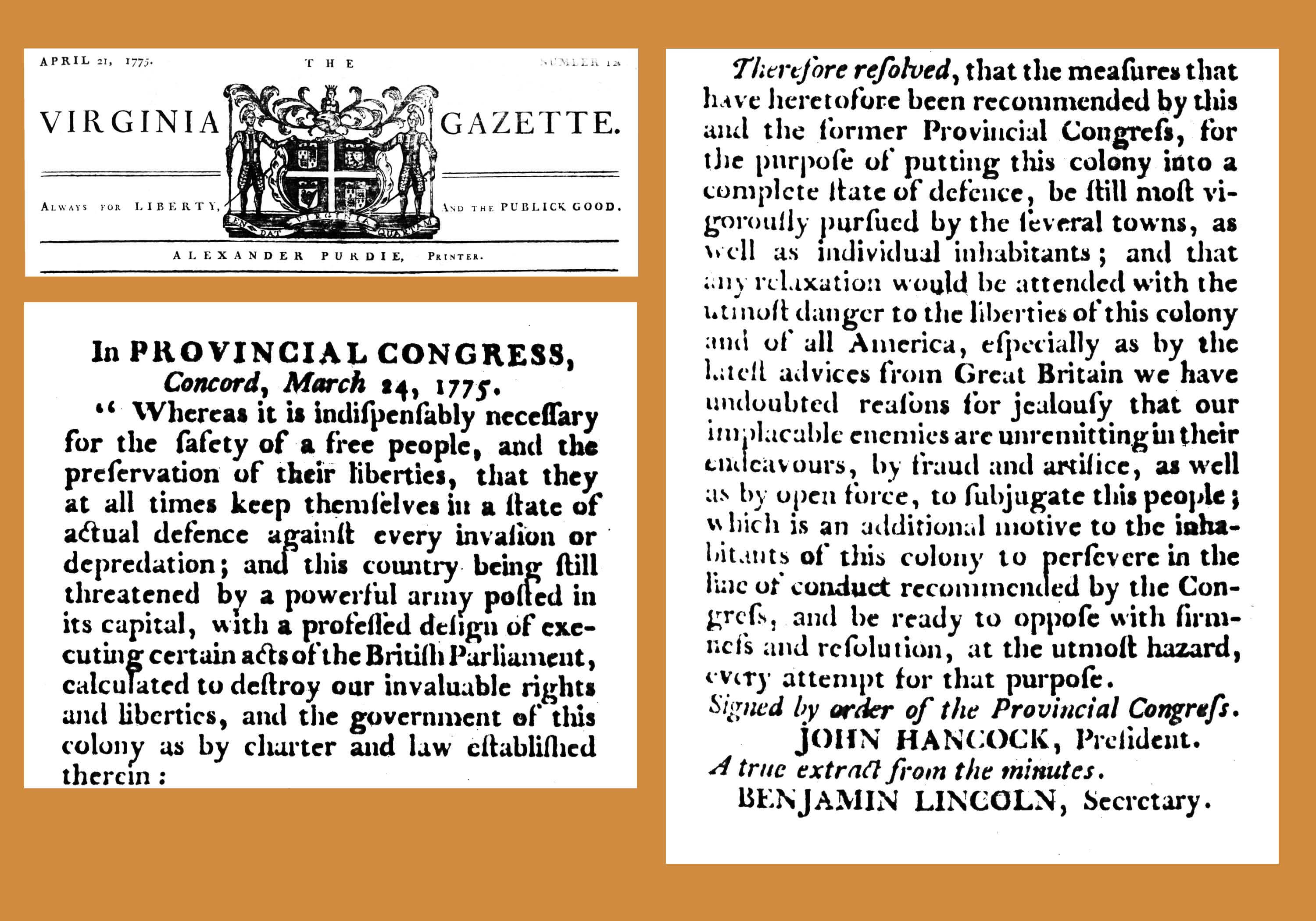
A March 24, 1775, resolution, signed by John Hancock, resolves that measures for "putting this colony into a complete state of defense, be still most vigorously pursued by the several towns, as well as individual inhabitants".

The Massachusetts militias had gathered a stock of weapons, powder, and supplies at Concord and further west in Worcester. After a large contingent of Regulars alarmed the countryside by an expedition from Boston to Watertown on March 30, The Pennsylvania Journal, a newspaper in Philadelphia, reported speculation that the Regulars had been going to Concord, seat of the Provincial Congress and storage site for military stores and provisions. The story further speculated that British troops intended another expedition to Concord to seize the stocks soon.

On March 30, 1775, the Massachusetts Provincial Congress resolved that any march out of Boston by Gage's command numbering 500 men or more, with artillery and baggage ought to be considered an attempt to carry out the late acts of Parliament by force. The resolution stated the attempt ought to be opposed under the recent resolution of the First Continental Congress and that the Patriots should form a military force to act solely on the defensive.

Patriot leaders except Paul Revere and Joseph Warren had left Boston by April 8. The Patriots had received word of Dartmouth's secret instructions to General Gage from sources in London before they reached Gage himself. Adams and Hancock had fled Boston to Hancock–Clarke House, home of one of Hancock's relatives, Jonas Clarke, to avoid the immediate threat of arrest.

=== Militia assemble ===
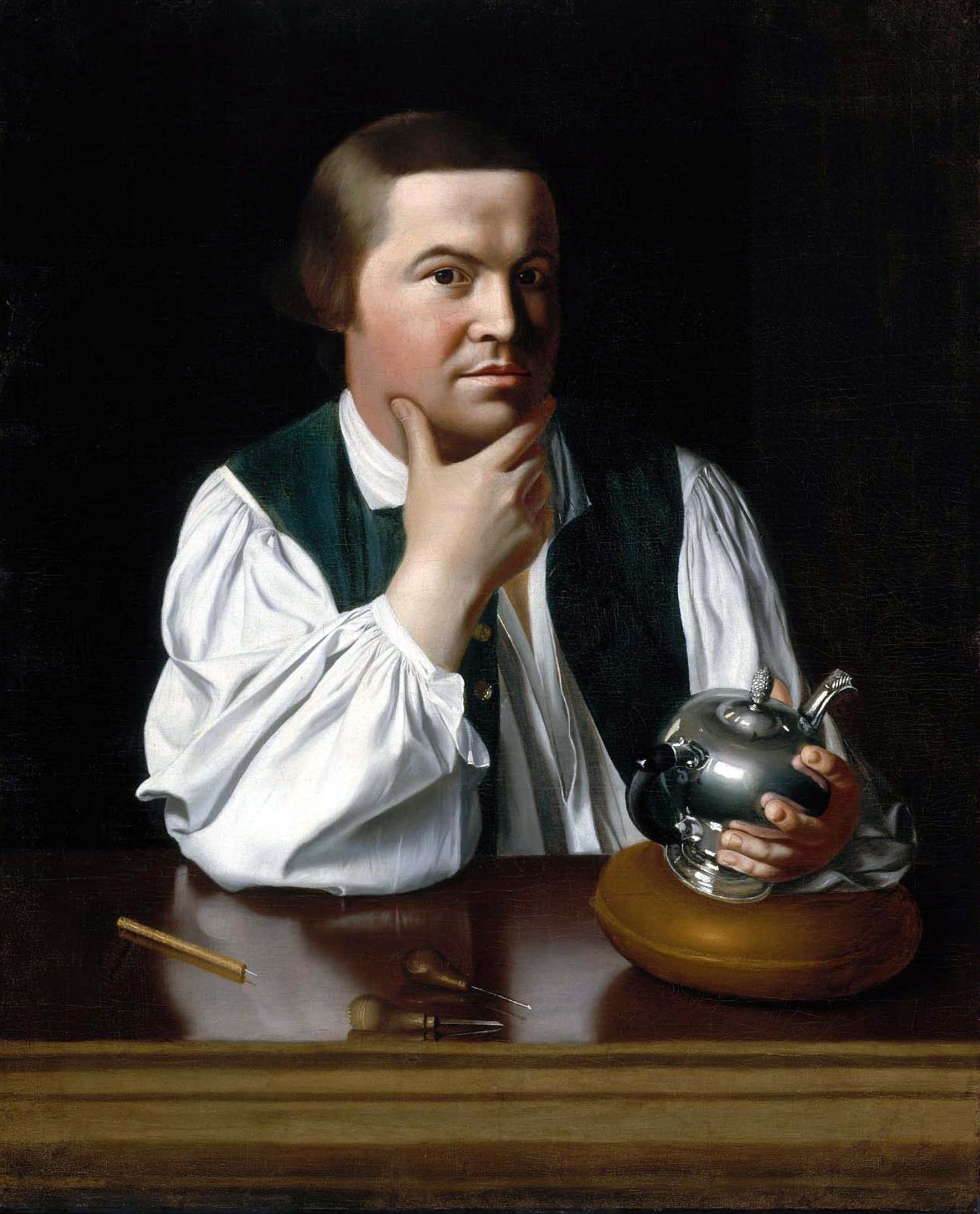
Silversmith Paul Revere and several other messengers on horseback sounded the alarm that the Regulars were leaving Boston.

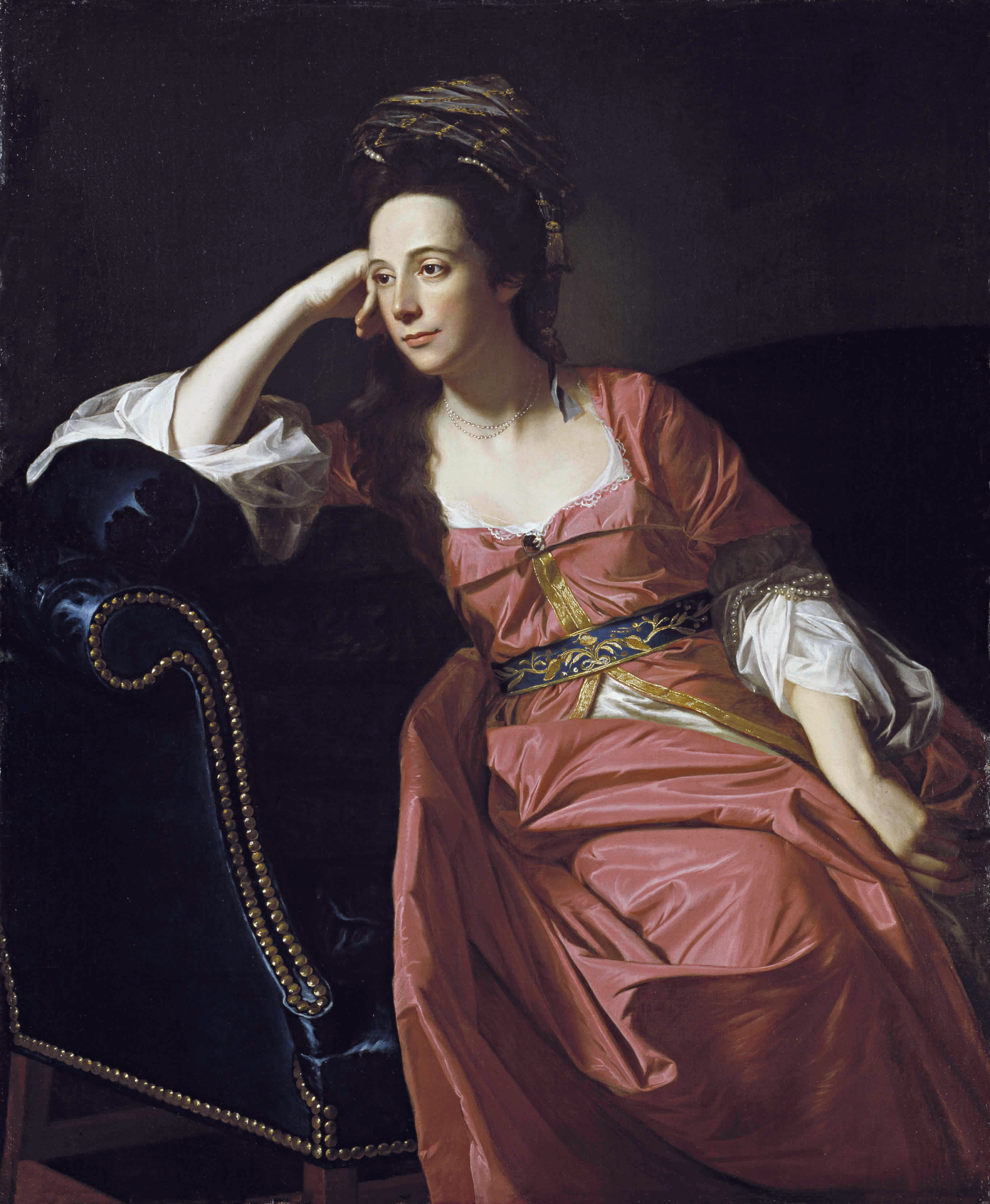
Margaret Kemble Gage may have given military intelligence to the rebels.

Between 9 and 10 pm on the night of April 18, 1775, Joseph Warren told Paul Revere and William Dawes that British troops were about to embark in boats from Boston bound for Cambridge and the road to Lexington and Concord. Warren's intelligence suggested that the Regulars' most likely objective would be the capture of Adams and Hancock. The Patriots initially did not worry about a possible march of Regulars to Concord, because the supplies at Concord were safe, but they were concerned that their leaders in Lexington were unaware of the potential danger that night. Revere, along with Warren and Dawes first sent a signal to Charlestown using lanterns hung in the steeple of Boston's Old North Church. They used the signal "one if by land, two if by sea", one lantern if the British were leaving Boston solely by land first south across Boston Neck, two lanterns if they were starting with a shorter water transfer north to Charlestown. Revere and Dawes then went on Paul Revere's Midnight Ride to warn Adams and Hancock and to alert colonial militias in nearby towns to muster to oppose the expedition.

The colonists knew that April 19 was the date of the planned expedition, despite Gage's efforts to keep the details hidden from all the British rank and file and even from the officers commanding the mission. Reasonable speculation suggested that the confidential source of this intelligence was Margaret Gage, General Gage's New Jersey-born wife, who had sympathies with the colonial cause and a friendly relationship with Warren.

After Revere and Dawes arrived in Lexington, they discussed the situation with Hancock, Adams and militia leaders. They believed that the approaching British forces were too large solely to arrest two men and that Concord was their main target. Lexington men then dispatched riders to surrounding towns, while Revere and Dawes continued along the road to Concord, accompanied by Samuel Prescott. In Lincoln, the riders encountered a British patrol led by Major Mitchell. Revere was captured, Dawes was thrown from his horse, and only Prescott escaped to reach Concord. More riders were sent to other towns from Concord. Upon hearing Prescott's news, the townspeople of Concord decided to remove remaining stores and send them to other towns nearby.

Revere, Dawes, and Prescott's ride triggered a flexible system of "alarm and muster" that the Patriots carefully developed months before because of the colonists' feeble response to the Powder Alarms. In addition to sending express riders with messages, the colonists used bells, drums, alarm guns, bonfires and a trumpet for rapid communication from town to town. They notified Patriots in dozens of eastern Massachusetts villages to muster their militias because over 500 Regulars were coming from Boston. This system was so effective that people in towns 25 miles (40 km) from Boston were aware of the British movements while they were still unloading their boats in Cambridge. These early warnings were crucial for assembling a sufficient number of militiamen to inflict severe casualties on the British troops later in the day. Adams and Hancock were moved to safety, first to the town now called Burlington and later to Billerica.

The total colonial force over the day included some 4,000 militiamen from local militia and minuteman companies. Although the Provincial Congress had organized local companies into regiments and brigades with designated commanders, units turned out piecemeal throughout the day. Thirty towns from the surrounding area sent men into combat. By afternoon, many regimental commanders were present and acted in a coordinated manner. Several provincial generals were en route to the fighting during the day but not in a position to assert overall command. Brigadier General William Heath of Roxbury, Massachusetts, took command of a phase of the fighting toward the day's end.

A National Park Service map showing the routes of the initial Patriot messengers and of the British expedition

=== British advance ===
Around dusk on April 18, General Gage met with his senior officers at the Province House. He told them that Lord Dartmouth had ordered him to take action against the colonials. Gage informed them that the senior colonel of his regiments, Lieutenant Colonel Smith, would command an expedition, with Major John Pitcairn of the Royal Navy's marines as his executive officer. The meeting adjourned around 8:30 pm. Then, Brigadier General Earl Percy mingled with townspeople on Boston Common. According to one account, the people there were discussing the unusual movement of British soldiers in town. When Percy questioned one man, the man said the Regulars would not succeed in capturing the cannon at Concord. Percy quickly returned to Province House and told a stunned General Gage about this comment. Gage then issued orders to prevent messengers from leaving Boston. Revere and Dawes, however, had already left.

The Regulars, around 700 infantrymen, were drawn from 11 of Gage's 13 occupying infantry regiments. Major Pitcairn commanded ten elite light infantry companies, and Lieutenant Colonel Benjamin Bernard commanded 11 grenadier companies, under the overall command of Smith.

The soldiers assigned to the expedition, including 350 from grenadier companies, were from the 4th (King's Own), 5th, 10th, 18th (Royal Irish), 23rd, 38th, 43rd, 47th, 52nd and 59th Regiments of Foot, and the 1st Battalion of His Majesty's Marine Forces. Protecting the grenadier companies were about 320 light infantry from the 4th, 5th, 10th, 23rd, 38th, 43rd, 47th, 52nd, and 59th Regiments, and the 1st Battalion of the Marines. Each company had its own lieutenant, but the majority of the captains commanding them were volunteers drawn from all the regiments in Boston and attached to the companies randomly. The temporary creation of an ad hoc force from diverse units to perform a specific task was not uncommon but on this occasion the lack of familiarity between commanders and company would cause communication and disciplinary problems during the battles.

The British woke their men at 9 pm on the night of April 18 and assembled them on the water's edge at the western end of Boston Common by 10 pm. Colonel Smith was late in arriving. Confusion resulted at the staging area because there was no organized boat-loading operation. Naval barges (transport and amphibious landing craft) were packed so tightly that there was no room for men to sit down. The troops disembarked near Phipps Farm in Cambridge into waist-deep water at midnight. After a lengthy halt to unload their gear, the Regulars began their 17 miles (27 km) march to Concord at about 2 am. During the wait they were given extra ammunition, cold salt pork, and hard sea biscuits. Because they would not be encamped, they carried no knapsacks. They carried their haversacks (food bags), canteens, muskets, and accoutrements and marched off in wet, muddy shoes and soggy uniforms. As they marched through Menotomy, sounds of the colonial alarms throughout the countryside caused the few officers aware of their mission to realize they had lost the strategically significant element of surprise.

At about 3 am, Colonel Smith ordered Major Pitcairn to quick march to Concord with six companies of light infantry. At about 4 am Smith made the wise but belated decision to send a messenger asking for reinforcements back to Boston.

== Battles ==
=== Lexington ===
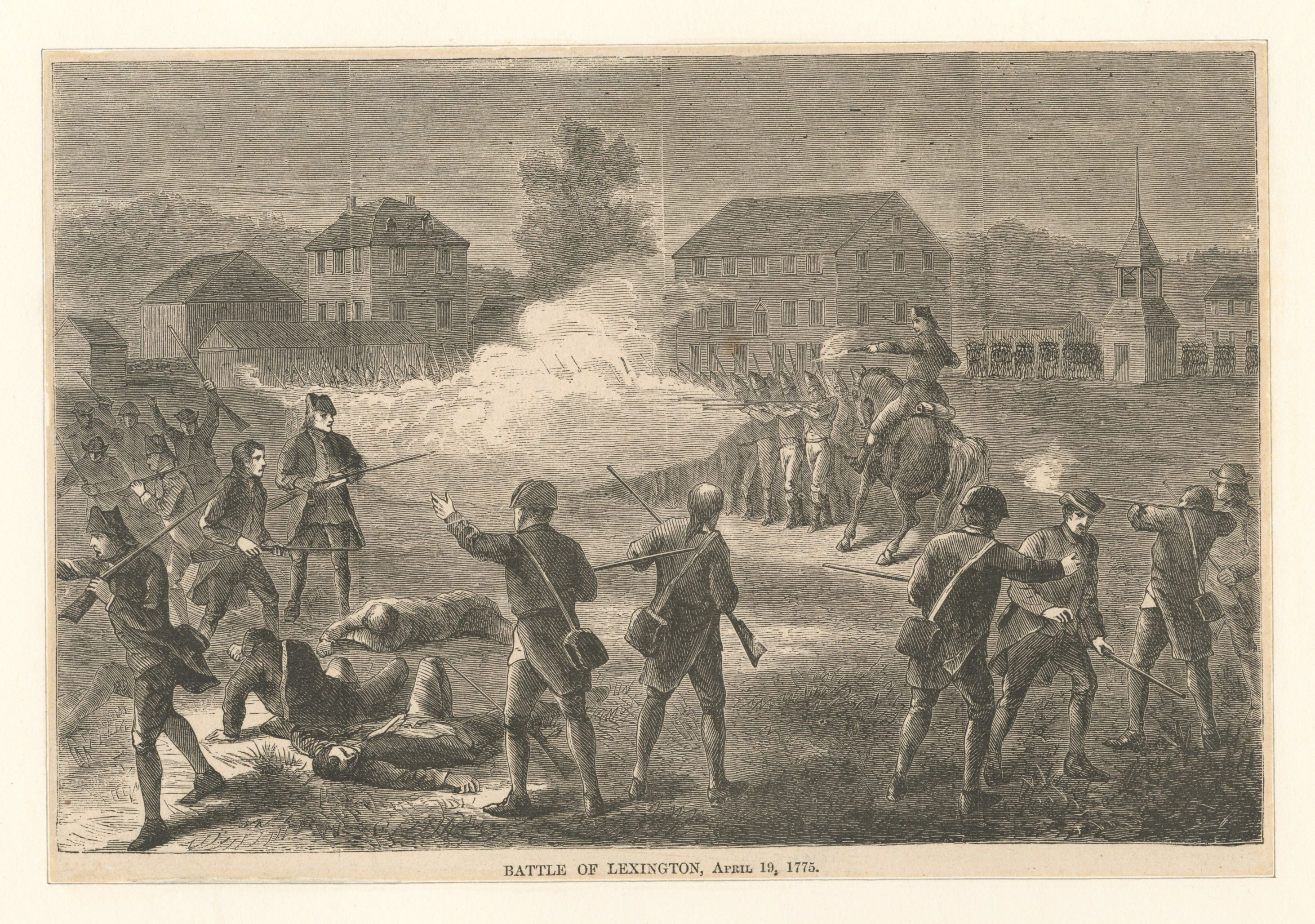
Battle of Lexington, April 19, 1775, New York Public Library

Although often styled a battle, the Lexington engagement was only a minor brush or skirmish. As the Regulars' advance guard under Pitcairn entered Lexington at sunrise on April 19, 1775, about 80 Lexington militiamen emerged from Buckman Tavern and stood in ranks on Lexington Common watching them. Between 40 and 100 spectators watched from the side of the road. The militiamen were part of Lexington's "training band", a local militia organization method dating back to the Puritans, and not a minuteman company. The militia leader, Captain John Parker, a veteran of the French and Indian War, had tuberculosis and his raspy voice could be difficult to hear. After waiting most of the night with no sign of British troops (and wondering if Revere's warning was accurate), at about 4:15 a.m., Parker got confirmation. Thaddeus Bowman, the last scout sent out earlier by Parker, rode up and told Parker that Regulars were coming in force and were nearby.

Parker positioned his company in parade-ground formation, on Lexington Common in plain sight (not behind walls), but not blocking the road to Concord. The militiamen made a show of determination, but no effort to prevent the Regulars' march. Parker was aware that his company was outmatched and did not intend to sacrifice his men for no purpose. He knew that most of the colonists' powder and military supplies at Concord had been hidden and no war had yet been declared. He also knew the British had gone on such expeditions before, found nothing, and marched back to Boston.

Many years later, Isaiah Thomas, one of the militiamen, recalled Parker's words as those now engraved in stone at the battle site: "Stand your ground; don't fire unless fired upon, but if they mean to have a war, let it begin here." According to Parker's sworn deposition after the battle, he concluded after consulting others that the militia gathered on the Common should not engage with the Regulars. When the Regulars approached, he ordered the militia to disperse and not fire. He testified that when the British appeared, they immediately rushed the militia and fired without provocation, killing eight of his men.

British Marine Lieutenant Jesse Adair, leading the advance guard, decided to protect the British column's flank by first turning right and then leading the companies onto the Common itself, in a confused effort to surround and disarm the militia. Major Pitcairn then arrived from the rear of the advance force. Pitcairn led his three companies to the left and halted. The remaining companies under Colonel Smith were further down the road. Although Pitcairn probably ordered the Regulars to advance on the militiamen, at least one account states that the officer in the lead was Lieutenant William Sutherland, who ordered the Patriots to disperse and "lay down your arms, you damned rebels!" Another Patriot account stated that three British officers led the charge with the foremost giving an order to fire. Amid the confusion caused by considerable yelling, some Patriots did not hear Parker's raspy command to leave the field and left slowly as the British charged. None threw down their arms.

==== First shot: Conflicting accounts ====
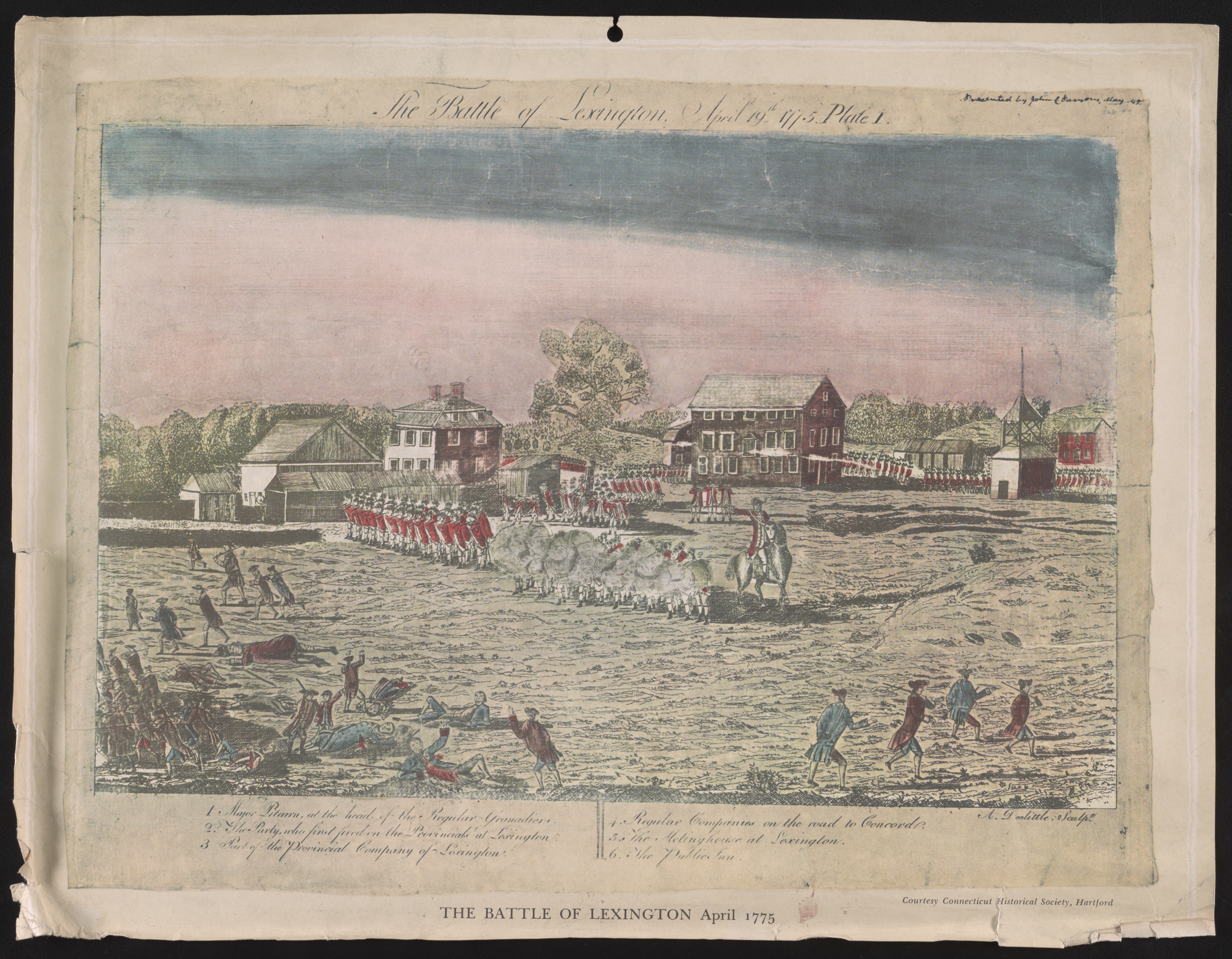
The first of four engravings by Amos Doolittle from 1775. Doolittle visited the battle sites and interviewed soldiers and witnesses. Contains controversial elements, possibly inaccuracies. Fire from the militia may have occurred but is not depicted.

British and Patriot soldiers' accounts from Lexington, and analyses by later historians, differ on who fired the first shot and whether any definite conclusion can be made. Modern historian David Hackett Fischer wrote that both British commander Pitcairn and Patriot commander Parker, ordered their men to hold their fire but a shot was fired from an unknown person. Some witnesses (on each side) claimed that someone on the other side fired first; however, many more witnesses claimed to not know which side fired the first shot. Some men on both sides stated that the initial shot did not come from the men immediately facing each other at the Common. Fischer has proposed the possibility of multiple near-simultaneous shots. Fischer wrote that while a few militiamen thought the regulars were only firing powder but not ball, when they realized the Regulars were firing ball, few if any of the militiamen managed to load weapons and return fire. The others ran for their lives. Historian Mark Urban wrote that British soldiers cheered and ran at the militiamen who lowered their weapons instead of moving in at an orderly walk to disarm them. According to Urban, one or two villagers opened fire and then, without orders from Pitcairn, one formed British company levelled its weapons and let fly a crashing volley.

Some British troops stated that the first shot was fired by an American onlooker from behind a hedge or around the corner of a tavern. Lieutenant John Barker of the 4th Regiment of Foot, claimed that when his regiment came upon his estimate of 200 to 300 militiamen (rather than the 80) formed in the middle of town, his regiment advanced without intending to attack the militia formation. He wrote that the militia fired two shots at the regiment. Then the regiment rushed upon the militia, fired and put them to flight.

In a subsequent deposition taken later that year, 34 militiamen testified that at about 5:00 a.m. on April 19, after hearing their drum beat, they went to the parade ground and spotted large numbers of regulars marching toward them. They claimed that some men of their militia company were still coming to the parade ground when the militia began to disperse and that the regulars fired on them while their backs were turned. In their testimony, the militiamen stated that a number of their company were instantly killed and wounded, but that nobody in the militia company opened fire before they were fired on and that the regulars kept up their fire until all militiamen had fled the scene.

==== British advance to Concord ====
After the shots were fired, the Regulars charged forward with bayonets. Eight Lexington men were killed, and ten were wounded. The only British casualty was a soldier who was wounded in the thigh. One wounded man, Prince Estabrook, was an enslaved Black man serving in the militia.

Pitcairn's companies got beyond their officers' control in part because they were unaware of the purpose of the day's mission. They began firing in different directions and preparing to enter private homes. Colonel Smith, who was arriving with the remaining Regulars, heard musket fire and rode forward to see the action. He found a drummer and ordered him to beat assembly. The grenadiers arrived on the scene soon thereafter. Order was restored among the British soldiers and the column reformed and marched toward Concord.

=== Concord ===
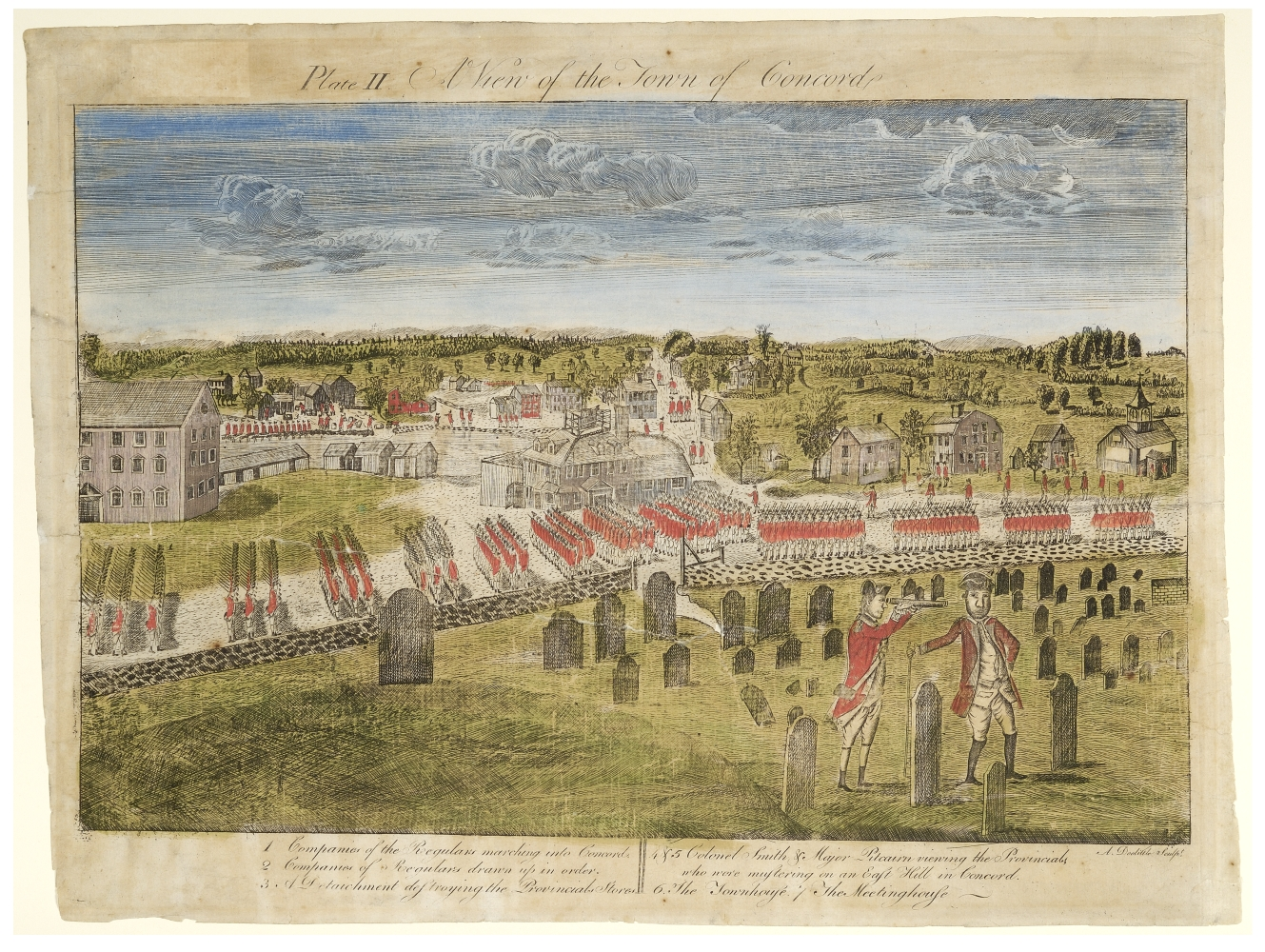
The second of four engravings by Amos Doolittle from 1775, depicting the British entering Concord

Upon receiving the alarm, militiamen of Acton, Concord, and Lincoln mustered in Concord. They were told about shots fired at Lexington. Initially, they were unsure whether to wait for reinforcements and to stay to defend the town or to move east and engage the British from superior terrain. A column of militia did march toward Lexington to meet the British, traveling about 1.5 miles (2 km) until they approached a column of Regulars. As the Regulars numbered about 700 and the militia only numbered about 250, the militiamen turned around and marched back to Concord, about 500 yards (457 m) ahead of the Regulars. The militia proceeded to a ridge overlooking the town and their officers discussed their next move. They decided to be cautious. Patriot Colonel James Barrett led the men from the center of town across the Old North Bridge to a hill about a mile north, where they watched British movements and activities in the town center. This step allowed the militia's ranks to grow as minuteman companies arrived from towns to the west before they engaged the British.

==== Search for militia supplies ====
Colonel Smith divided troops arriving at Concord to carry out Gage's orders to search for supplies. The 10th Regiment's company of grenadiers under Captain Mundy Pole secured the South Bridge, while about 100 men from seven companies of light infantry under Captain Parsons secured the North Bridge. The militiamen could see the British at North Bridge across cleared fields. Captain Parsons took four companies from the 5th, 23rd, 38th, and 52nd Regiments up the road 2 miles (3.2 km) beyond the North Bridge to search Barrett's Farm, where intelligence indicated supplies could be found. Two companies from the 4th and 10th Regiments were stationed to guard their return route, and one company from the 43rd remained to guard the bridge itself. These companies, under relatively inexperienced commander Captain Walter Laurie were significantly outnumbered by the 400-plus militiamen. The concerned Captain Laurie sent a messenger to Smith requesting reinforcements.

Using detailed information from Loyalist spies, grenadier companies searched the small town for military supplies. When they arrived at Ephraim Jones's tavern, by the jail on the South Bridge road, they found the door barred shut, and Jones refused them entry. According to Loyalists reports, Pitcairn knew cannon had been buried on the Jones property. Jones was ordered at gunpoint to show where the guns were buried. These were three massive pieces that fired 24-pound shot. The guns were much too heavy to use defensively, but quite effective against fortifications. The grenadiers smashed the trunnions of these guns so they could not be mounted. They also burned gun carriages found at the village meetinghouse. When the fire spread to the meetinghouse itself, local resident Martha Moulton persuaded the soldiers to help in a bucket brigade to save the building. The British threw most of the barrels of confiscated flour into a local millpond, rather than smashing them. They also threw 550 pounds of musket balls into the millpond. Only the damage done to the cannon was significant. All of the shot and much of the flour was recovered. The flour on the edges of the barrels had effectively caulked the barrels and preserved the remaining flour. General Gage had explicitly instructed Colonel Smith that "you will take care that the soldiers do not plunder the inhabitants, or hurt private property". Thus, the Regulars were generally scrupulous in their treatment of the civilians during the search, including paying for food and drink. The locals used this excessive politeness to advantage. They were able to misdirect British searches from several smaller caches of militia supplies.

Barrett's Farm had been an arsenal weeks before, but few weapons remained on April 19. According to family legend, these were quickly buried in furrows to look like a planted crop. The British troops found no supplies of consequence there.

==== North Bridge ====
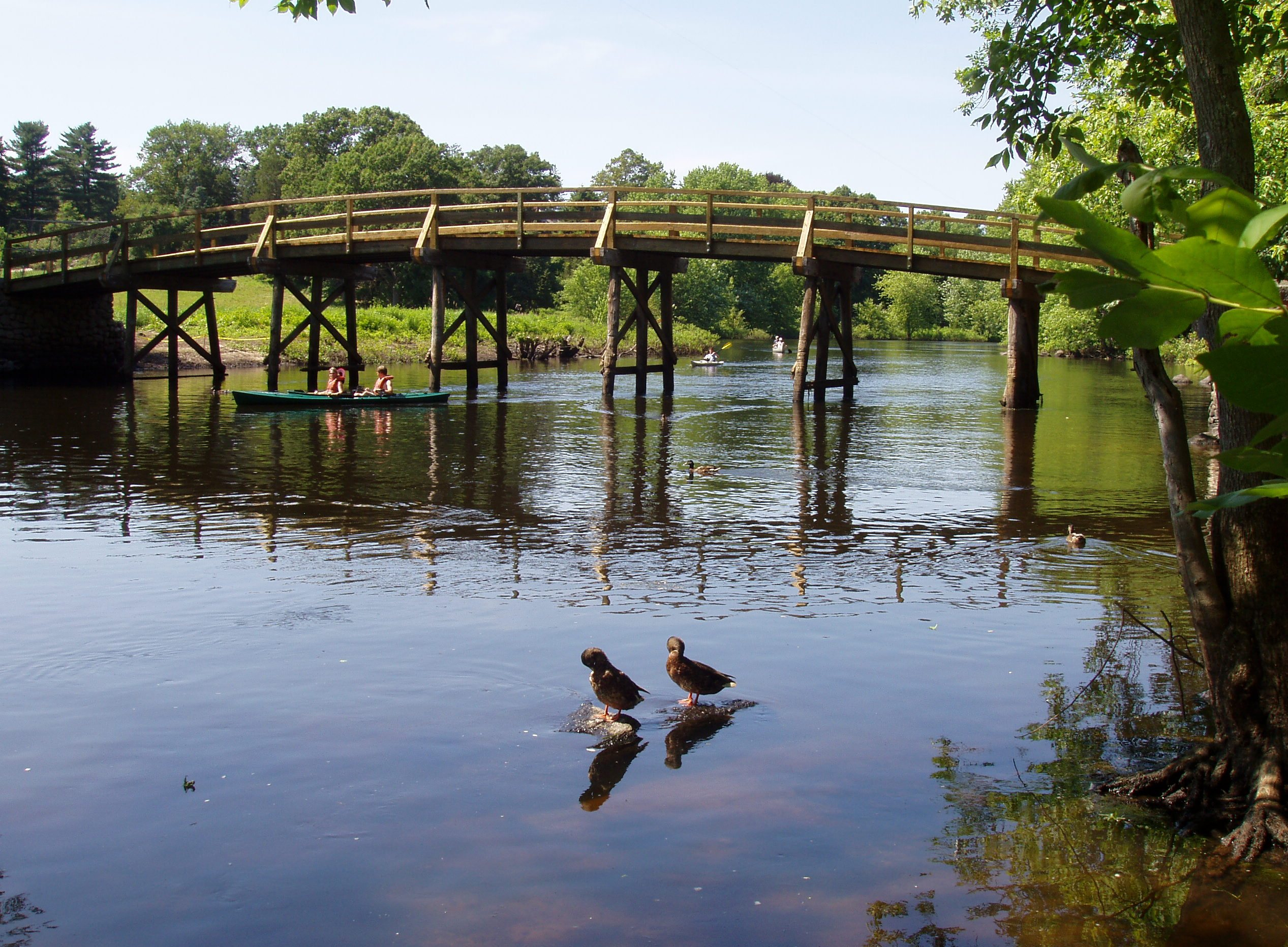
The reconstructed North Bridge in Minute Man National Historical Park, Concord

Colonel Barrett's troops saw smoke rising from the village square as the British burned cannon carriages. Seeing only a few light infantry companies directly below, Barrett ordered his men to march toward town from their vantage point on Punkatasset Hill to a lower, closer flat hilltop about 300 yards (274 m) from the Old North Bridge. As the militia advanced, the two British companies from the 4th and 10th Regiments which held the position near the road retreated to the bridge, yielding the hill to Barrett's men.

Five full companies of minutemen and five more of militiamen from Acton, Concord, Bedford and Lincoln occupied the hill. At least 400 Patriots confronted Captain Laurie's light infantry companies, totaling 90–95 men. Barrett ordered his men to form one long line two abreast on the highway leading down to the bridge. Then, while overlooking North Bridge from the top of the hill, Barrett, Lt. Col. John Robinson of Westford and the other captains discussed advancing on the bridge. The Acton minutemen, led by Captain Isaac Davis, were the only troops fitted with bayonets. Barrett asked Davis, who commanded a company of minutemen from Acton, if his company would be willing to lead the advance. Davis responded, "I'm not afraid to go, and I haven't a man that's afraid to go."

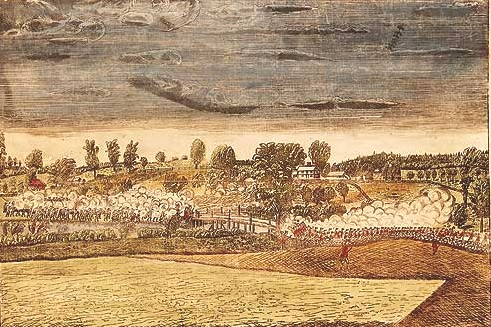
The third of four engravings by Amos Doolittle from 1775, depicting the engagement at the North Bridge

Barrett ordered the men to load their weapons but not to fire unless fired upon. Then he ordered them to advance. Laurie ordered the British companies guarding the bridge to retreat across it. One officer then tried to pull up the loose planks of the bridge, but militia Major Buttrick yelled at the Regulars to stop. The minutemen and militia advanced on the bridge in column formation, two by two, led by Major Buttrick and Lt. Col. Robinson. They kept to the road because it was surrounded by the Spring floodwaters of the Concord River.

Not having been reinforced, Laurie ordered the British to form positions for "street firing" in a column running perpendicular to the river behind the bridge. This formation was useful for sending a large volume of fire into a narrow alley between buildings, but not for firing on an open path from behind a bridge. Confusion reigned as Regulars retreating over the bridge also tried to form up in the street-firing position. Lieutenant Sutherland, who was in the rear of the formation, saw Laurie's mistake and ordered flankers to be sent out. But as he was from a company different from the men under his command, only three soldiers obeyed him. The others tried their best to follow the orders of the superior officer.

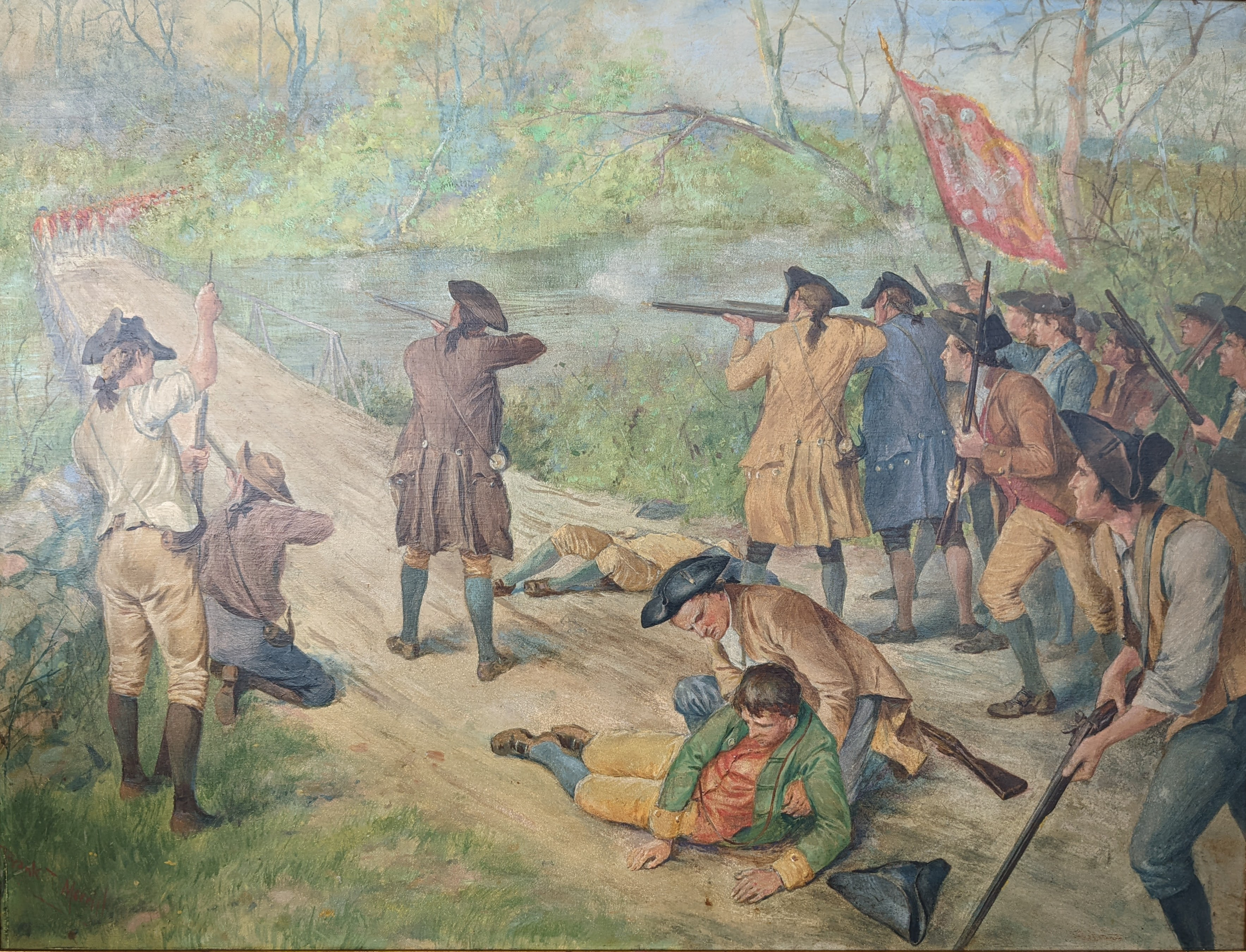
A 1909 artist's version of the fight at the North Bridge

A shot rang out. According to Captain Laurie's later report, the shot was likely a warning shot fired by a panicked, exhausted British soldier from the 43rd. Two other Regulars then fired shots that splashed into the river. Next the narrow group up front, possibly thinking an order to fire had been given, fired a ragged volley before Laurie could stop the firing.

Two Acton Minutemen at the head of the line marching to the bridge were killed instantly. Four more were wounded. Major Buttrick then yelled to the militia, "Fire, for God's sake, fellow soldiers, fire!" At this point the lines were separated by the Concord River and the bridge but were only 50 yards (46 m) apart. The few front rows of colonists, bound by the road and blocked from forming a line of fire, managed to fire over each other's heads and shoulders at the Regulars massed across the bridge. Four of the eight British officers and sergeants, who were leading from the front of their troops, were wounded by the Patriot volley. At least three privates from the 4th were killed or mortally wounded, and nine more were wounded.

The British at the bridge were both outnumbered and outmaneuvered. Lacking effective leadership and terrified at the superior numbers of the enemy, with their spirit broken, and likely not having experienced combat before, the British abandoned their wounded. They fled to the safety of grenadier companies coming from the town center. This move isolated Captain Parsons and the companies searching for arms at Barrett's Farm.

==== After the fight at the bridge ====
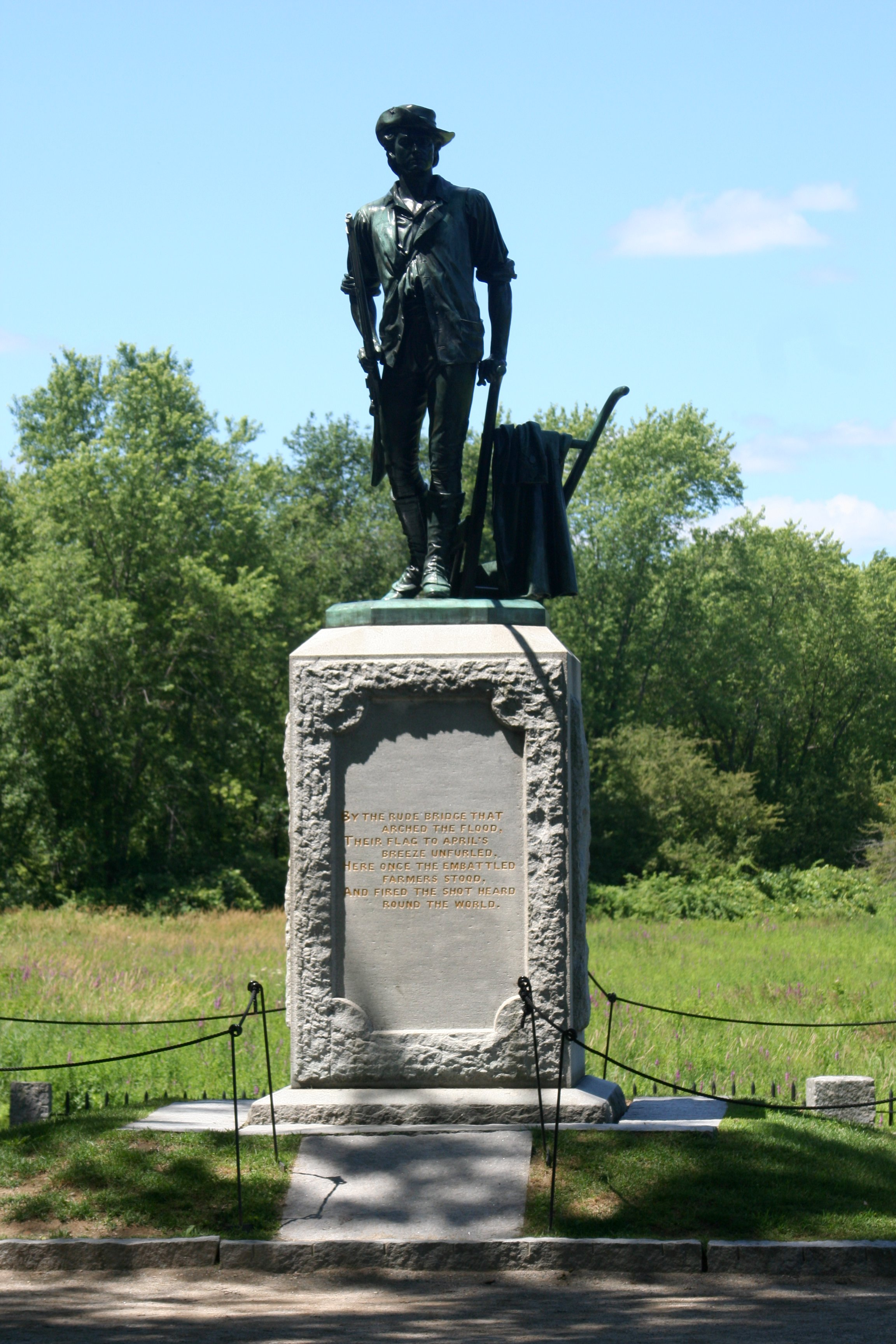
The Minute Man by Daniel Chester French at the North Bridge was meant to represent the typical provincial but was also inspired in large part by the story of Capt. Isaac Davis of Acton who died where the statue now stands. It is inscribed with verse from Ralph Waldo Emerson's "Concord Hymn".

At this stage of the fighting, some colonists advanced; more retreated; some went home to see to the safety of their homes and families. Colonel Barrett eventually recovered control. He moved some of the militia back to the hilltop 300 yards (274 m) and sent Major Buttrick with others across the bridge to a defensive position on a hill behind a stone wall.

Colonel Smith heard the exchange of fire from his position in the town moments after he received the request for reinforcements from Laurie. He quickly assembled two companies of grenadiers to lead toward the North Bridge himself. These troops soon met the shattered men of the three light infantry companies running towards them. Smith now worried about the safety of the four companies at Barrett's farm since their route to town was now unprotected. Smith then saw the minutemen in the distance behind a wall. He moved forward with only his officers to take a closer look. One of the minutemen behind that wall observed: "If we had fired, I believe we could have killed almost every officer there was in the front, but we had no orders to fire and there wasn't a gun fired."

As the detachment of Regulars sent to Barrett's farm marched back from their fruitless search, they passed through the mostly-deserted battlefield and saw dead and wounded comrades on the bridge. One of the dead looked to them as if he had been scalped, angering and shocking the British soldiers. They crossed the bridge and returned to the town by 11:30 a.m. The colonists watched and kept defensive positions without attacking. The Regulars continued to search for and destroy the few military supplies found in the town, ate lunch, reassembled for marching, and left Concord after noon. This delay in departure gave colonial militiamen from outlying towns more time to reach the road back to Boston first.

=== Return march ===
==== Concord to Lexington ====
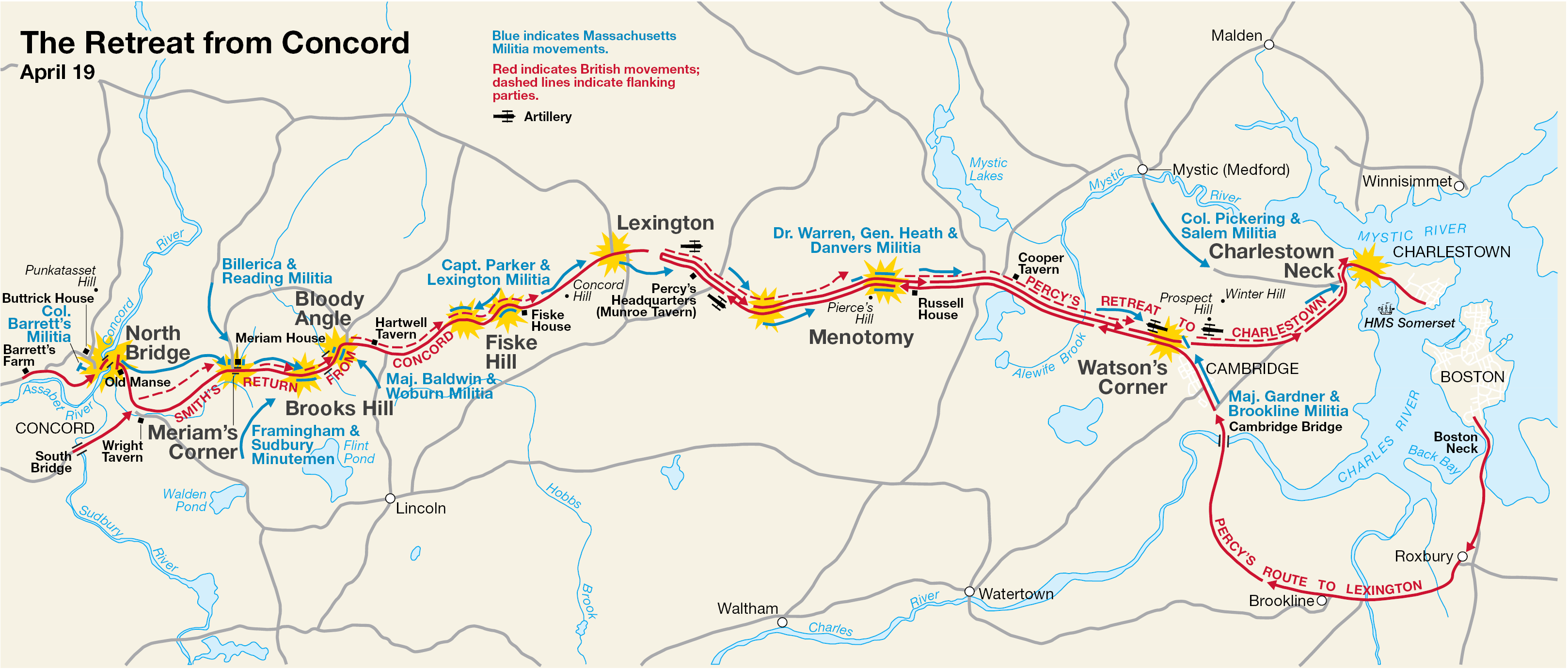
A National Park Service map showing the retreat from Concord and Percy's rescue

As the British marched east from Concord, Colonel Smith sent flankers to follow a ridge and protect his forces from the roughly 1,000 colonials now in the field. This ridge ended near Meriam's Corner, a crossroads about one mile (2 km) outside Concord. There the main road came to a bridge across Elm Brook, a tributary of the Shawsheen River. The British needed to pull the flankers back into the main column and close ranks to a mere three soldiers abreast to cross the bridge. Colonial militia companies arriving from the north and east converged here, clearly outnumbering the Regulars. As the last British soldiers marched over the narrow bridge, their rear guard wheeled and fired a volley at the colonial militiamen. The militia had been firing irregularly and ineffectively from a distance but had closed to within musket range. The colonists returned fire with deadly effect. Two Regulars were killed and perhaps six wounded, without colonials taking casualties. Smith sent out his flanking troops again after crossing the small bridge.

On Brooks Hill (also known as Hardy's Hill) about 1 mile (1.6 km) past Meriam's Corner, nearly 500 militiamen had assembled to the south of the road, awaiting an opportunity to fire down upon the British column. Smith's leading forces charged up the hill to drive them off, but the colonists did not withdraw, inflicting significant casualties on the attackers. Smith withdrew his men from Brooks Hill, and the column continued on to another small bridge into Lincoln. There, at Brooks Tavern, more militia companies intensified the attack from north of the road.

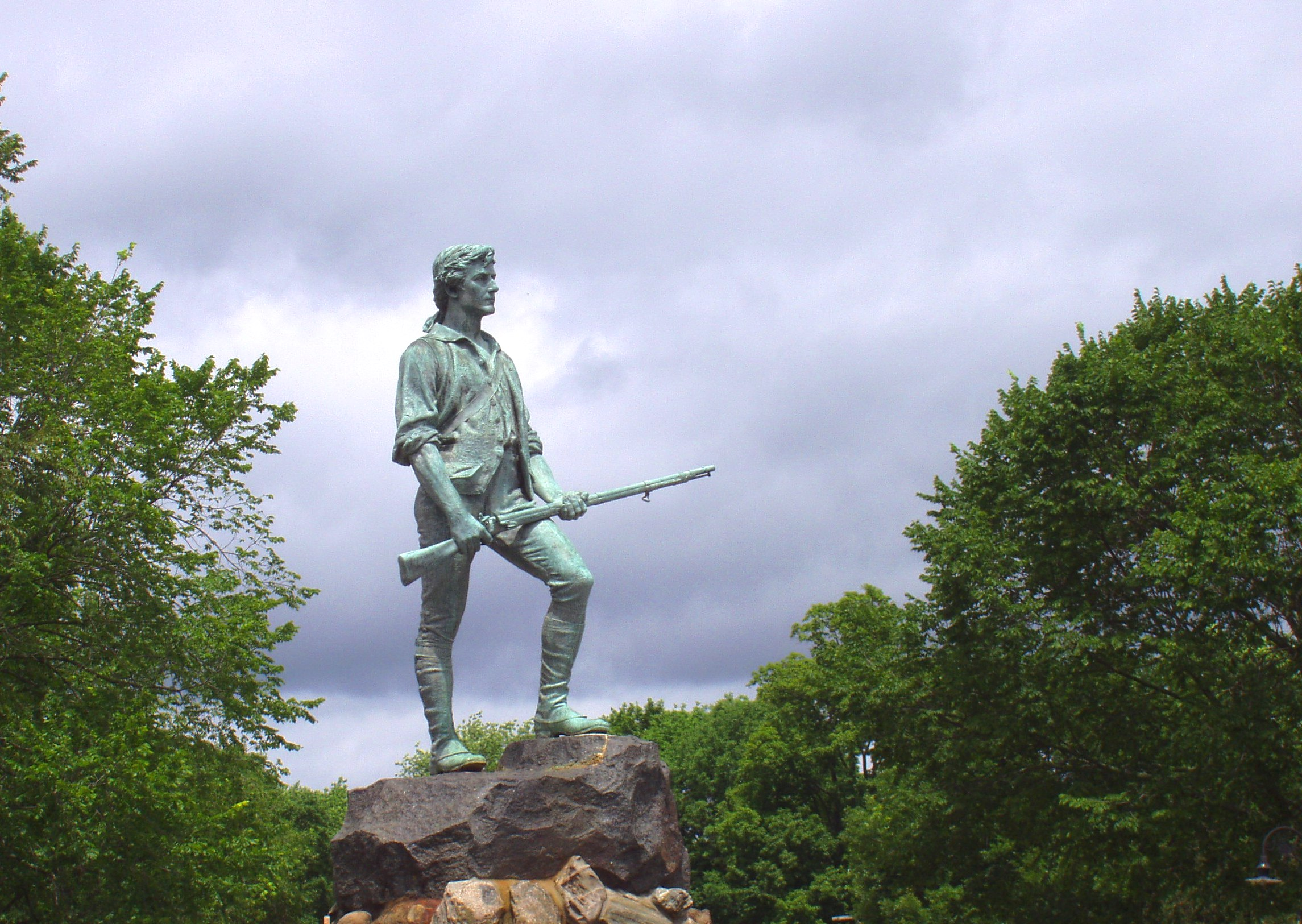
This statue is known as The Lexington Minuteman is commonly believed to depict Captain John Parker. It is by Henry Hudson Kitson and stands at the town green of Lexington, Massachusetts.

The Regulars soon reached a point in the road, now referred to as the "Bloody Angle", where the road rises and curves sharply to the left through a lightly wooded area. Here, the militia company from Woburn positioned themselves on the southeast side of the bend in the road in a rocky, lightly wooded field. Additional militia flowing parallel to the road from the engagement at Meriam's Corner positioned themselves on the northwest side of the road, catching the British in a crossfire. Other militia companies on the road closed from behind to attack. Some 500 yards (460 m) further along, more militiamen took a position at another sharp curve, this time to the right. Again the British were caught in a crossfire from both sides of the road. While passing along these two sharp curves, the British lost thirty soldiers killed or wounded. Four colonial militiamen were also killed, including three officers. The British soldiers escaped by breaking into a trot, a pace that the colonials could not maintain through the woods and swampy terrain. Colonial forces on the road itself behind the British were too densely packed and disorganized to mount more than a harassing attack from behind.

As militia forces from other towns arrived, the colonial forces increased to about 2,000 men. Beyond the curves, the road straightened to the east, with cleared fields and orchards along the sides. Colonel Smith sent out flankers, who succeeded in trapping some militiamen from behind and inflicting casualties. British casualties also mounted from these engagements and from persistent long-range fire. The exhausted British now were running out of ammunition.

When the British neared the boundary between Lincoln and Lexington, Captain John Parker's Lexington militiamen, including some bandaged from their earlier encounter, ambushed them from a hill overlooking the road. Colonel Smith was wounded in the thigh and knocked from his horse. Major Pitcairn assumed effective command of the British column and sent light infantry companies up the hill to clear out the militia. The British light infantry cleared two more hills as the column continued east—"The Bluff" and "Fiske Hill"— while taking more casualties from ambushes set by fresh militia companies. Here, Major Pitcairn's horse bolted in fright from a militia musket volley, throwing Pitcairn to the ground and injuring his arm. Both principal British commanders were now injured or unhorsed. Their men were tired, thirsty and with little more ammunition. A few surrendered or were captured. Some now broke formation and ran forward toward Lexington. A British officer wrote that officers got to the front, presented bayonets and told men they would die if they advanced. At this, the men formed up under heavy fire.

Only one British officer remained uninjured among the three companies at the head of the British column as it approached Lexington. He understood the column's perilous situation, with few men having ammunition and the men so fatigued that flankers could not be kept out. He then heard cheering further ahead. A full British brigade, about 1,000 men with artillery, under the command of Earl Percy, had arrived. The time was about 2:30 p.m. The original British column had been on the march since 2:00 a.m.

In their later accounts, British officers and soldiers noted their frustration about colonial militiamen firing at them from behind trees and stone walls, rather than confronting them in large, linear formations as in European warfare. Despite this description being fostered in myth, from the beginning at the North Bridge and throughout the British retreat, the colonial militias repeatedly operated as coordinated companies, even when dispersed to take advantage of cover. Reflecting on the British experience that day, Earl Percy understood the significance of the American tactics when he wrote that the "Rebels" had attacked in a very scattered and irregular manner but with perseverance and resolution. He wrote that they should not look at them as an irregular mob because they knew what they were doing as they had been employed as Rangers against the Indians and Canadians. He noted that the country was covered with woods and hills and was very advantageous to their method of fighting.

==== Percy's rescue ====
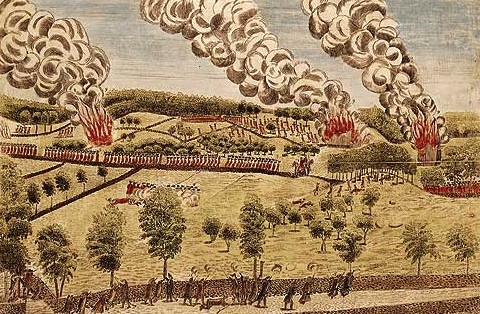
The fourth of four engravings by Amos Doolittle from 1775, showing Percy's rescue in Lexington

General Gage had anticipated that Colonel Smith's expedition might require reinforcement, so Gage drafted orders for reinforcing units to assemble in Boston at 4 a.m. But in his obsession for secrecy, Gage had sent only one copy of the orders to the adjutant of the 1st Brigade, whose servant left the envelope on a table. Also at about 4 a.m., Smith's column was within three miles of Lexington. Smith now realized that all element of surprise was lost as the alarm was spreading through the countryside. So he sent a rider back to Boston with a request for reinforcements. At about 5 a.m., the rider reached Boston. The 1st Brigade: the line infantry companies of the 4th, 23rd, and 47th Regiments, a battalion of Royal Marines, two 6-pounder guns from 4th Battalion, Royal Artillery and battalion companies from 7 regular companies, under the command of Brigadier General Hugh Percy was ordered to assemble. Once again only one copy of the orders was sent to each commander. The order for the Royal Marines was delivered to the desk of Major Pitcairn, who was already on the Lexington Common with Smith's column. After these delays, Percy's brigade, about 1,000 strong, left Boston at about 8:45 a.m.

Percy took the land route across Boston Neck and over the Great Bridge, which some quick-thinking colonists had stripped of its planking to delay the British. His men then came upon an absent-minded tutor at Harvard College and asked him which road would take them to Lexington. The Harvard man, apparently oblivious to the reality of what was happening around him, showed him the proper road without thinking. Percy's troops arrived in Lexington, about 2:00 p.m., they heard distant gunfire. They set up the cannons and deployed lines of Regulars on high ground with commanding views of the town. Smith's men approached like a fleeing mob with colonial militia in close formation in pursuit. Percy ordered his artillery to open fire at extreme range, dispersing the colonial militiamen. Smith's men collapsed with exhaustion when they reached Percy's lines.

Against the advice of his Master of Ordnance, Percy left Boston without spare ammunition for his men or for the two artillery pieces. Percy thought extra wagons would slow the march. Percy's men had only 36 rounds. Each artillery piece had only a few rounds carried in side-boxes. After Percy left the city, Gage directed two ammunition wagons guarded by one officer and thirteen men to follow. This convoy was intercepted by a small party of older, veteran militiamen still on the "alarm list", but who could not join their militia companies because they were more than 60 years old. These men ambushed the convoy and demanded the surrender of the wagons. The British ignored them and drove their horses on. The old men opened fire, shot the lead horses, killed two sergeants, and wounded the officer. The British survivors ran. Six of them threw their weapons into a pond before they surrendered.

==== Lexington to Menotomy ====
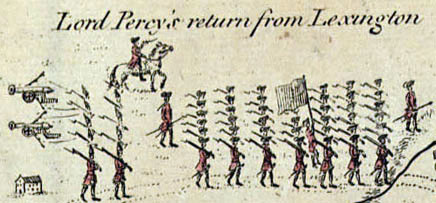
Percy's return to Charlestown (detail from 1775 map of the battle)

Percy assumed control of the combined forces of about 1,700 men and let them rest, eat, drink, and have their wounds tended at field headquarters (Munroe Tavern) before resuming the march. The British set out from Lexington at about 3:30 p.m., in a formation emphasizing defense along the sides and rear of the column. Wounded Regulars rode on the cannon and were forced to hop off when fired at by militiamen. Percy's men were often surrounded, but they had the tactical advantage of interior lines. Percy could shift his units more easily to where they were needed, while the colonial militiamen needed to move around the outside of his formation. Percy placed Smith's men in the middle of the column, while the 23rd Regiment's line companies made up the column's rearguard. Because of information provided by Smith and Pitcairn about the Americans' style of attack, Percy ordered the rear guard to be rotated every mile or so, to allow some of his troops to rest briefly. Flanking companies were sent to both sides of the road. A powerful force of Marines acted as the vanguard to clear the road ahead.

Earlier in the day, Massachusetts Brigadier General William Heath traveled to Watertown to discuss tactics with Joseph Warren, who had left Boston that morning, and other members of the Massachusetts Committee of Safety. Heath, along with Warren, arrived at Lexington and reacted to Percy's artillery and flankers by ordering the militiamen to avoid close formations that would attract cannon fire. Instead, they surrounded Percy's marching square with a moving ring of skirmishers at a distance to inflict maximum casualties at minimum risk. A few mounted militiamen would dismount on the road, fire muskets at the approaching Regulars, then remount and gallop ahead to repeat the tactic. Although the effective combat range of British and colonial muskets was about 50 yards (46 m), unmounted militiamen would often fire from long range, hoping to hit British soldiers on the road without taking fire. Colonial infantrymen also attacked the British column's flankers. When the column moved out of range, the infantrymen would move around and forward to re-engage the column later. Heath sent messengers to arriving militia units, directing them to places along the road to engage the Regulars. Heath and Warren themselves led skirmishers in small actions during the battle. Fischer noted that effective leadership overall probably made the greatest contribution to Patriot tactical success.

Fighting grew more intense as Percy's forces moved into Menotomy. Fresh militiamen poured gunfire into British ranks while individual homeowners fought from their own property. Marksmen concealed in some homes forced the British to clear their path house by house.

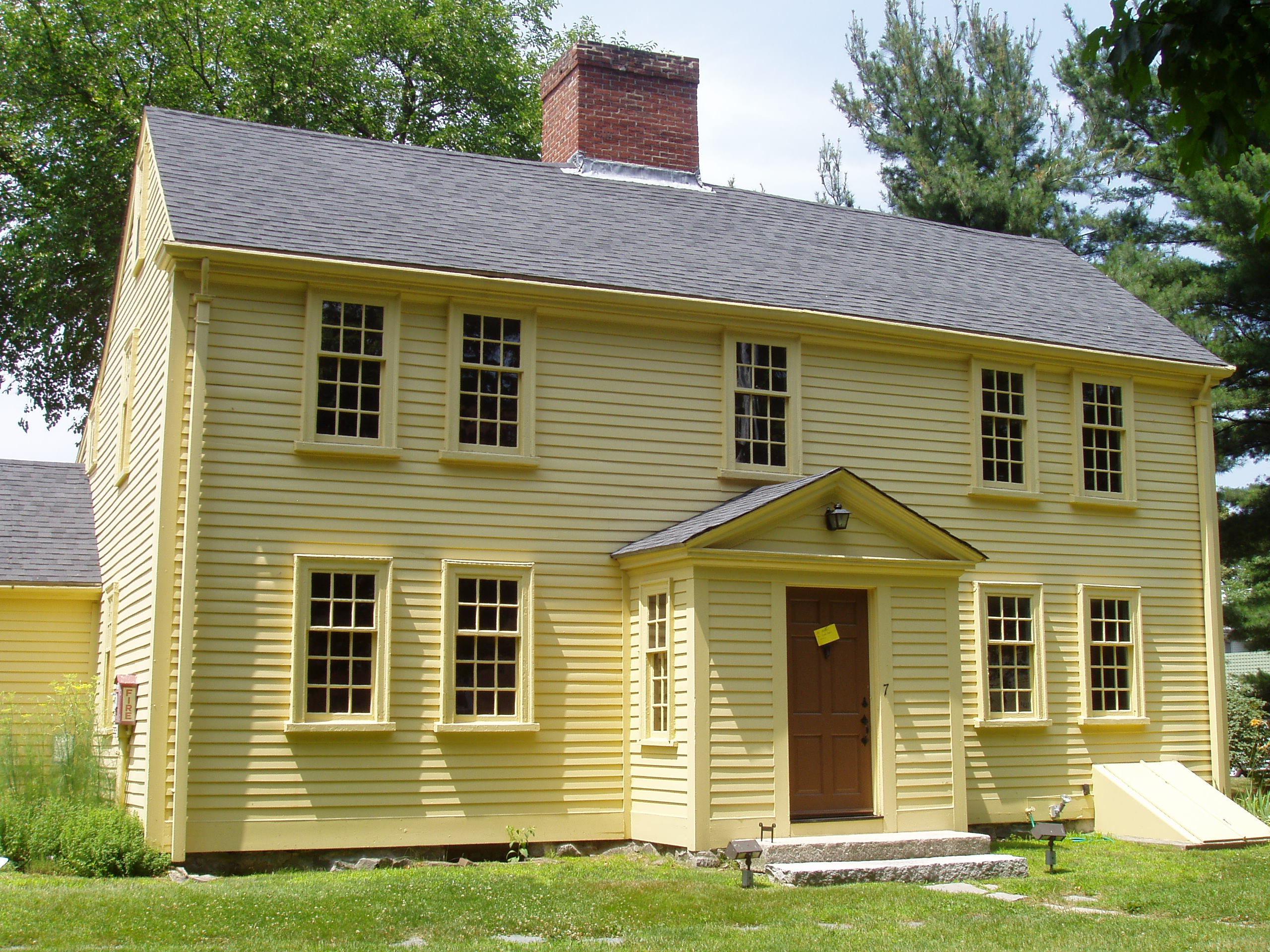
The Jason Russell House in Arlington

The largest engagement of the day took place on the farm of Jason Russell, located at the center of Menotomy. Here hundreds of militiamen from towns further out had assembled over the course of the afternoon to await the appearance of the returning British column. Twenty-one colonial combatants and an unknown number of British Regulars lost their lives in the ensuing battle. Eleven of those colonials, including Jason himself, along with two of the Regulars, were killed in or beside the Jason Russell House itself.

During this fighting, Percy and Smith lost control of their men. Many junior officers in flank parties had difficulty stopping their exhausted, enraged men from killing everyone they found inside buildings. A few Regulars committed atrocities such as killing two drunk men at Coopers Tavern to repay for the supposed scalping at the North Bridge and for their own casualties from an often unseen enemy. Although colonists later exaggerated many accounts of British ransacking and burning for propaganda value (and to get financial compensation from the colonial government), taverns along the road definitely were ransacked and liquor stolen by the troops. Houses also were plundered by British soldiers. Some soldiers who stayed too long were killed by concealed minutemen.

Percy learned from Pitcairn and other wounded officers that militiamen used stone walls, trees and buildings to hide behind and shoot at the British column in more thickly settled towns closer to Boston. He ordered flank companies to clear colonial militiamen out of such places. Far more blood was shed in Menotomy and Cambridge than elsewhere. The colonists lost 25 men killed and nine wounded at those places, and the British lost 40 killed and 80 wounded, with the 47th Foot and Royal Marines suffering the most casualties. About half the day's fatalities for each side were suffered at Menotomy and Cambridge.

==== Menotomy to Charlestown ====
The British troops crossed the Menotomy River (today known as Alewife Brook) into Cambridge, and the fight grew more intense. Fresh militia arrived in close array instead of in a scattered formation, and Percy used his two artillery pieces and flankers at a crossroads called Watson's Corner to inflict heavy damage on them.

Earlier in the day, Heath had ordered the Great Bridge to be dismantled. Percy's brigade was about to approach the broken-down bridge and a riverbank filled with militia when Percy directed his troops down a narrow track (now Beech Street, near present-day Porter Square) and onto the road to Charlestown. The militia (now numbering about 4,000) were unprepared for this movement, and the circle of fire was broken. An American force moved to occupy Prospect Hill (in modern-day Somerville), which dominated the road, but Percy moved his cannon to the front and dispersed them with his last rounds of ammunition.

A large militia force arrived from Salem and Marblehead, which might have cut off Percy's route to Charlestown. These men halted on nearby Winter Hill, allowing the British to escape. The commander of this force, Colonel Timothy Pickering, was accused of permitting the British to pass because he hoped to avoid war by preventing their total defeat. Pickering later claimed that he had stopped on Heath's orders, but Heath denied this. Near dark, Pitcairn's Marines defended a final attack on Percy's rear as they entered Charlestown. The Regulars took up strong positions on the hills of Charlestown. Some of them had been without sleep for two days and had marched 40 miles (64 km) in 21 hours, eight hours of which had been spent under fire. But now they held high ground protected by heavy guns from HMS Somerset. Gage quickly sent over line companies of two fresh regiments—the 10th and 64th—to occupy the high ground in Charlestown and build fortifications. The fortifications were never completed and would later be a starting point for the militia works built in June before the Battle of Bunker Hill. General Heath studied the British position and decided to withdraw the militia to Cambridge.

== Aftermath ==
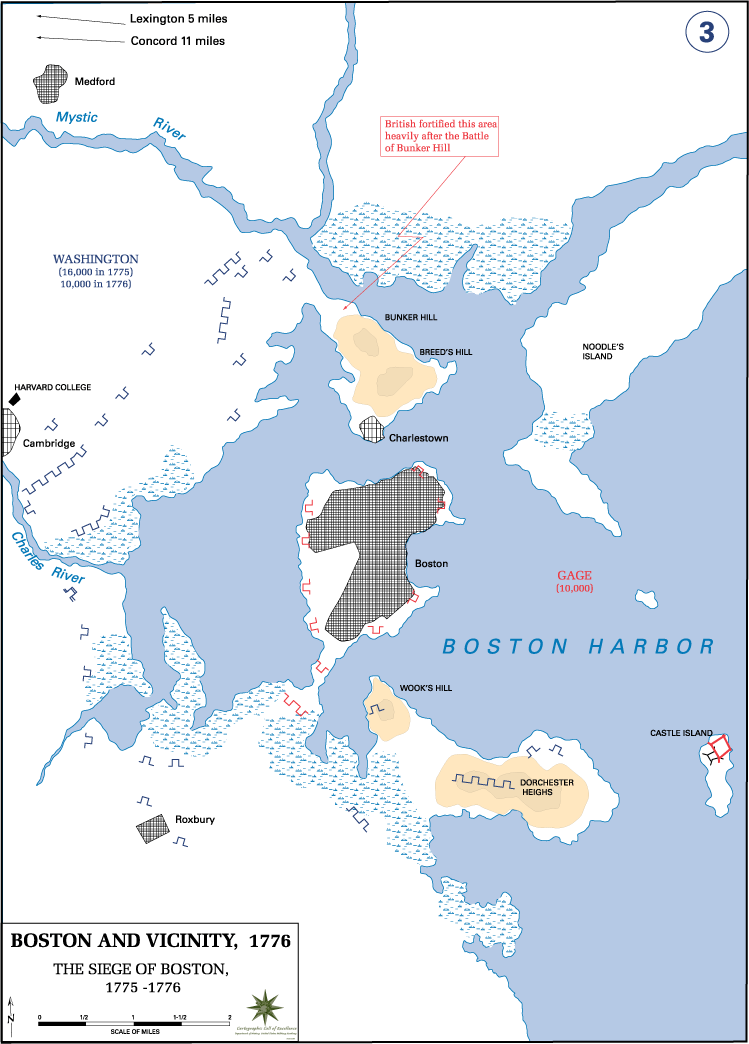
The siege of Boston 1775–1776

The British expedition was a failure as the resulting battles and aftermath caused the fighting they were intended to prevent, while few weapons were seized.

In the morning, Boston was surrounded by a large militia army, numbering over 15,000 men from throughout New England. General Artemas Ward arrived on June 20 and replaced William Heath in command. The militia then formed a siege line extending from Chelsea, around the peninsulas of Boston and Charlestown, to Roxbury, effectively surrounding Boston on three sides. During the following days, the colonial forces grew larger, as militias from New Hampshire, Rhode Island, and Connecticut arrived on the scene. The Second Continental Congress adopted these men into the beginnings of the Continental Army. Even after this open warfare had started, Gage refused to impose martial law in Boston. He persuaded the town's selectmen to surrender all private weapons in return for promising that any inhabitant could leave town.

A contest for British political opinion followed the battle. Within four days, the Massachusetts Provincial Congress had collected scores of sworn testimonies from militiamen and British prisoners. When word leaked out a week after the battle that Gage was sending his official description of events to London, the Provincial Congress sent a packet of these detailed depositions, signed by over 100 participants in the events, on a faster ship. The documents were presented to a sympathetic official and printed by the London newspapers two weeks before Gage's report arrived. Gage's official report was too vague to influence opinions. George Germain, no friend of the colonists, wrote, "the Bostonians are in the right to make the King's troops the aggressors and claim a victory". Politicians in London tended to blame Gage for the conflict instead of their own policies and instructions. The British troops in Boston variously blamed Gage and Smith for the failures at Lexington and Concord.

The day after the battle, John Adams left his home in Braintree to ride along the battlefields. He became convinced that "the Die was cast, the Rubicon crossed". Thomas Paine in Philadelphia had previously thought of the argument between the colonies and the Home Country as "a kind of law-suit", but after news of the battle reached him, he "rejected the hardened, sullen-tempered Pharaoh of England forever". George Washington received the news at Mount Vernon and wrote to a friend, "the once-happy and peaceful plains of America are either to be drenched in blood or inhabited by slaves. Sad alternative! But can a virtuous man hesitate in his choice?"

== Legacy ==
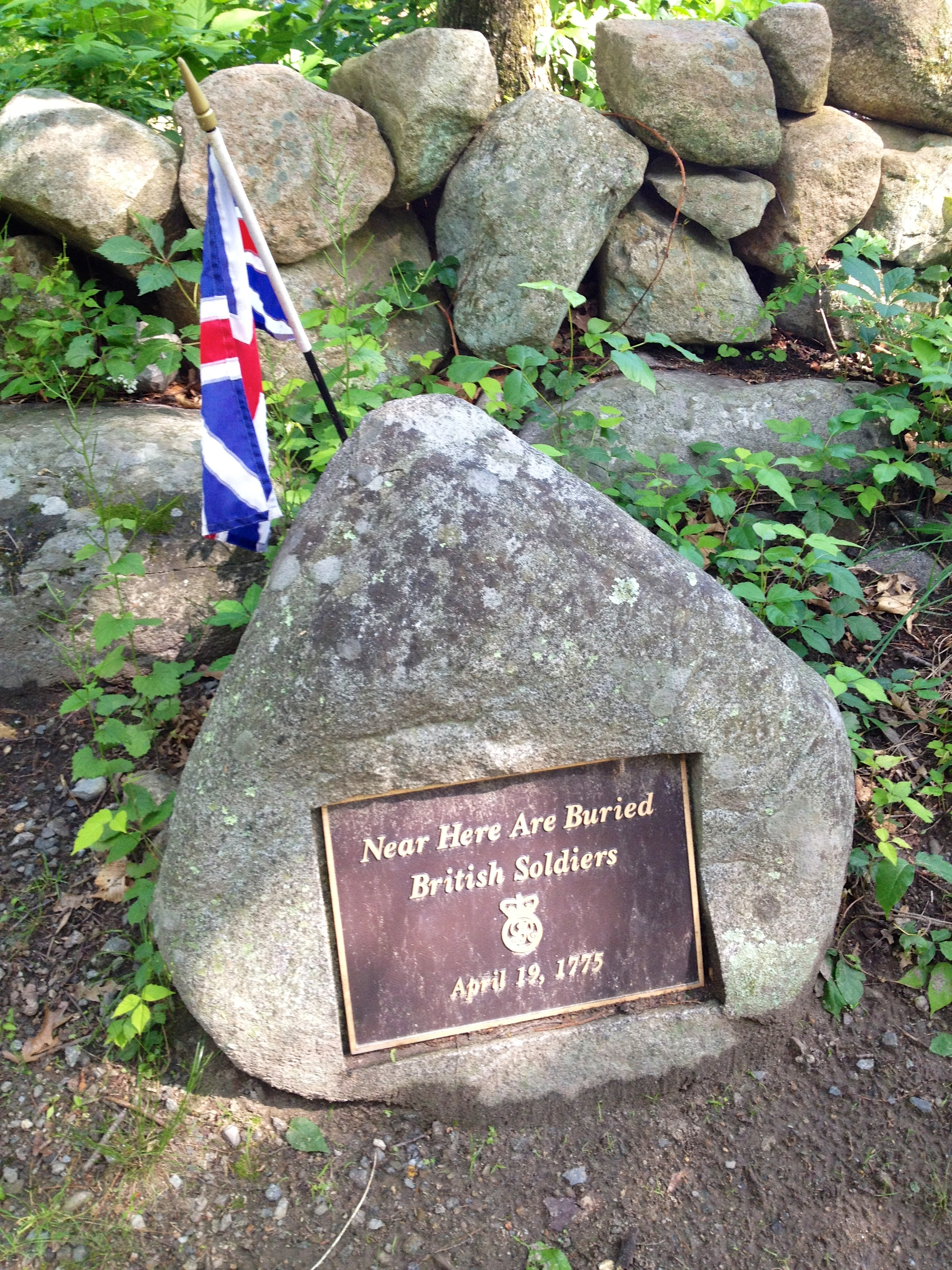
Gravemarkers along Battle Road in Lexington are maintained with Britain's 1775 version of the Union Flag.

It was important to the early American government that an image of British fault and American innocence for this first battle of the war be maintained. Reportedly unfavorable activities and depositions were not published and were returned to the participants (including Paul Revere). Paintings portrayed the Lexington fight as an unjustified slaughter.

The issue of which side was to blame for the first shot grew during the early nineteenth century. Older participants' testimony in later life all said the British fired first at Lexington whereas many said they were unsure who fired first at the time. The "Battle" took on an almost mythical quality in the American consciousness. A complete shift occurred, and the Patriots were portrayed as actively fighting for their cause, rather than as suffering innocents. Later paintings of the Lexington skirmish began to portray the militia standing and fighting back in defiance.

Ralph Waldo Emerson immortalized the events at the North Bridge in his 1837 "Concord Hymn". For much of the 19th century it was a means by which Americans learned about the Revolution, helping to forge the identity of the nation. After 1860, several generations of schoolchildren memorized Henry Wadsworth Longfellow's poem "Paul Revere's Ride". Historically it is inaccurate (for example, Paul Revere never made it to Concord), but it captures the idea that an individual can change the course of history. In the 20th century, popular and historical opinion varied about the events of the historic day, often reflecting the political mood of the time.

By the rude bridge that arched the flood
Their flag to April's breeze unfurled
Here once the embattled farmers stood
And fired the shot heard round the world.

— First verse of Emerson's "Concord Hymn"

The site of the Lexington battle is now known as the Lexington Battle Green. It is listed on the National Register of Historic Places and is a National Historic Landmark. Several memorials commemorating the battle have been placed there.

The lands surrounding the North Bridge in Concord, as well as approximately 5 miles (8.0 km) of the road along with surrounding lands and period buildings between Meriam's Corner and western Lexington are part of Minute Man National Historical Park. There are walking trails with interpretive displays along routes that the colonists might have used that skirted the road. The Park Service often has personnel (usually dressed in period dress) offering descriptions of the area and explanations of the events of the day. The American Battlefield Trust and its partners have saved one acre of the battlefield at the site of Parker's Revenge.

Timothy McVeigh carried out the Oklahoma City bombing on April 19, 1995; the attacks were timed to coincide with the 220th anniversary of the Battles of Lexington and Concord.

Four current units of the Massachusetts National Guard (181st Infantry, 182nd Infantry, 101st Engineer Battalion, and 125th Quartermaster Company) are derived from American units that participated in the Battles of Lexington and Concord. Several ships of the United States Navy, including two World War II aircraft carriers, were named in honor of the Battle of Lexington.

=== Last surviving veteran ===
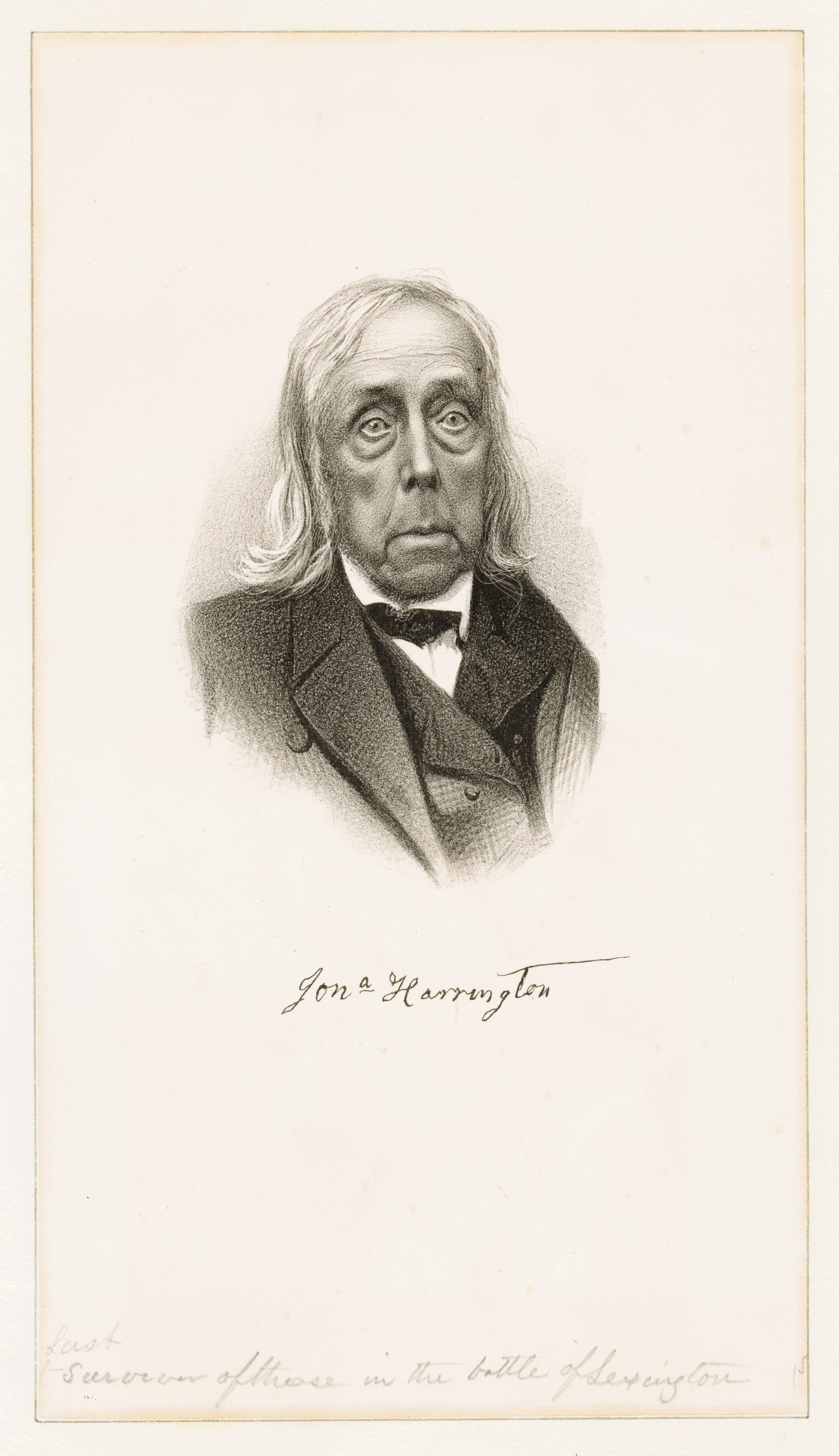
Sketch of Harrington in the 1840s or early 1850s

Jonathan Harrington Jr. (July 8, 1758 – March 26, 1854) was a chair-maker and a fifer in the Continental Army, best known as the last surviving veteran of the Battles of Lexington and Concord. Harrington was born to Jonathan Harrington Sr. (1723–1809) and Abigail Moore (1729–1776). Jonathan Sr. was a local politician and later fought with the Minutemen, like his son. Jonathan worked as a chair-maker in Lexington. On April 19, 1775, a 16-year-old Jonathan was awoken by his mother and he was a fifer in Captain John Parker's Company when the British arrived in Lexington. During the battle, his cousin (also named Johnathan Harrington) was mortally wounded and died following the battle. Little else is known about Harrington's military career, but in 1782, he was out of the army and married Sally Banks. The couple continued to live in Lexington and they had seven children together.

Sally died on July 28, 1847, and Jonathan continued to work as a chair-maker and a repairman and was even photographed in the 1850s. In 1850, a joint 75th anniversary celebration with Concord was held, Harrington was one of two veterans present for the festivities. Jonathan died on March 26, 1854, and was buried at Old Burying Ground in Lexington. According to a report in the Boston Liberator on April 7, 1854, Harrington’s funeral drew Governor Emory Washburn and other state dignitaries, and his casket was escorted by eighteen military companies—more soldiers than had been present at the battles of Lexington and Concord.

His former home, built in 1788, still stands at 955 Massachusetts Avenue in Lexington and is privately owned. It is listed on the Freedom’s Way National Heritage Area. A photograph of Harrington, along with his first‑person recollection of the events of April 19, 1775, is featured in the American Revolution Museum at Yorktown as part of its exhibit on the opening battles of the war.

== Commemorations ==
Patriots' Day, an observed legal holiday in Massachusetts, is celebrated annually on the third Monday in April to honor the battle. The holiday is also recognized by Connecticut, Maine, and by the Wisconsin public schools. Re-enactments of Paul Revere's ride are staged, as are the battle on the Lexington Green, and ceremonies and firings are held at the North Bridge.

On April 19, 1875, President Ulysses S. Grant and members of his cabinet joined 50,000 people to mark the 100th anniversary of the battles. The sculpture by Daniel Chester French, The Minute Man, located at the North Bridge, was unveiled on that day. A formal ball took place in the evening at the Agricultural Hall in Concord.

The Town of Concord invited 700 prominent U.S. citizens and leaders from the worlds of government, the military, the diplomatic corps, the arts, sciences, and humanities to commemorate the 200th anniversary of the battles. On April 19, 1975, as a crowd estimated at 110,000 gathered to view a parade and celebrate the Bicentennial in Concord, President Gerald Ford delivered a major speech near the North Bridge, which was televised to the nation. President Ford laid a wreath at the base of The Minute Man statue and then respectfully observed Sir Peter Ramsbotham, British Ambassador to the United States, laying a wreath at the grave of British soldiers killed in the battle.

== See also ==
- List of American Revolutionary War battles
- American Revolutionary War#Early engagements
- Westminster Massacre

== Bibliography ==
- Anderson, Fred (1984). A People's Army: Massachusetts Soldiers & Society in the Seven Years War. Chapel Hill, NC: University of North Carolina Press. ISBN 978-0-8078-4576-9.
- Beck, Derek W. (2015). Igniting the American Revolution: 1773-1775. Naperville, IL: Sourcebooks, Inc. ISBN 978-1-4926-1395-4.
- Borneman, Walter R. (2014). American Spring: Lexington, Concord, and the Road to Revolution. New York: Little Brown & Company. ISBN 978-0-316-22102-3.
- Bradford, Charles H (1996). The Battle Road: Expedition to Lexington and Concord. Eastern National. ISBN 1-888213-01-9.
- Chidsey, Donald Barr (1966). The Siege of Boston: An on-the-scene Account of the Beginning of the American Revolution. New York: Crown. OCLC 890813.
- Coburn, Frank Warren (1922). The Battle of April 19, 1775: In Lexington, Concord, Lincoln, Arlington, Cambridge, Somerville, and Charlestown, Massachusetts: Second Edition Revised and with Additions. The Lexington historical society. OCLC 2494350.
- Dana, Elizabeth Ellery (1924). The British in Boston: Being the Diary of Lieutenant John Barker of the King's Own Regiment from November 15, 1774 to May 31, 1776. Cambridge, Massachusetts: Harvard University Press. OCLC 3235993.
- Daughan, George C. (2018). Lexington and Concord: The Battle Heard Round the World. New York: W. W. Norton & Co. ISBN 978-0-393-24574-5.
- Emerson, Ralph Waldo (1837). "Emerson's Concord Hymn". National Park Service. Archived from the original on July 9, 2008.
- Emerson, Ralph Waldo; Curtis, George William. Proceedings at the Centennial Celebration of Concord Fight, April 19, 1875. Town of Concord. ISBN 9781425514518. OCLC 4363293.
- Evelyn, W. Glanville. Memoirs and Letters of Captain W. Glanville Evelyn. Oxford: James Parker and Co. ISBN 978-1-4290-1742-8.
- Fischer, David Hackett (1994). Paul Revere's Ride. Oxford University Press US. ISBN 0-19-508847-6. This book is extensively footnoted, and contains a voluminous list of primary resources concerning all aspects of these events.
- Ford, Gerald R. (April 19, 1975). "Remarks at the Old North Bridge, Concord, Massachusetts". The American Presidency Project. Archived from the original on September 28, 2008.
- French, Allen. The Day of Concord and Lexington. Boston: Little, Brown & Co. ISBN 9780598832825.
- French, Allen (1932). General Gage's Informers. Ann Arbor: University of Michigan Press.
- Frothingham, Richard Jr. (1903). History of the Siege of Boston and of the Battles of Lexington, Concord, and Bunker Hill. Little and Brown. OCLC 221368703.
- Galvin, Gen. John R. The Minute Men: The First Fight: Myths & Realities of the American Revolution, Pergamon-Brassey's, Washington, D.C., 1989. ISBN 0-08-036733-X. This book provides a military perspective on the battle and its leaders.
- Hafner, Donald L. (2006). "The First Blood Shed in the Revolution". Boston College.
- Hurd, Duane Hamilton (1890). History of Middlesex County, Massachusetts, Volume 1: With Biographical Sketches of Many of Its Pioneers and Prominent Men. J. W. Lewis & co. OCLC 2155461.
- Journals of the Continental Congress, Vol. II, May 10–September 20, 1775. Washington, DC: Government Printing Office. 1905.
- Journals of the House of Commons, Volume 35. 1775.
- Kifner, John (April 20, 1975). "160,000 Mark Two 1775 Battles; Concord Protesters Jeer Ford". The New York Times.
- Lister, Jeremy (1931). Concord fight, being so much of the narrative of Ensign Jeremy Lister of the 10th regiment of foot as pertains to his services on the 19th of April, 1775, and to his experiences in Boston during the early months of the siege. Cambridge, Massachusetts: Harvard University Press.
- Massachusetts Provincial Congress (1775). A Narrative of the Excursion and Ravages of the King's Troops. Worcester: Isaiah Thomas.
- Moore, Frank (1876). The Diary of the Revolution: A Centennial Volume. Hartford, CT: J.B. Burr Publishing.
- Morrissey, Brendan (1995). Boston 1775. Osprey Publishing. ISBN 1-85532-362-1.
- Moulton, Martha. "Martha Moulton's testimony and reward, February 4, 1776" (PDF). National Park Service. Archived from the original (PDF) on February 16, 2008.
- Napierkowski, Marie Rose; Ruby, Mary K (1998). Poetry for Students: Presenting Analysis, Context and Criticism on Commonly Studied Poetry. Gale Research. ISBN 978-0-7876-2724-9.
- Philbrick, Nathaniel (2013). Bunker Hill. New York: Viking. ISBN 978-0-670-02544-2.
- Quarles, Benjamin (1996). The Negro in the American Revolution. Chapel Hill, NC: University of North Carolina Press. ISBN 0-8078-4603-1.
- Raphael, Ray and Marie Raphael (2015). The Spirit of '74: How the American Revolution Began. New York: New Press.
- Revere, Paul (1798). Letter to Jeremy Belknap of January, 1798. Boston: Massachusetts Historical Society.
- Revere, Paul (1775). Deposition of April 1775. Boston: Massachusetts Historical Society.
- Shy, John (1990). A People Numerous & Armed. Ann Arbor: University of Michigan Press. ISBN 978-0-472-06431-1.
- Sawicki, James A. (1981). Infantry Regiments of the US Army. Dumfries, VA: Wyvern Publications. ISBN 978-0-9602404-3-2.
- Smith, Samuel Abbot (1874). West Cambridge 1775. Arlington, MA: Arlington Historical Society.
- Tourtellot, Arthur B. Lexington and Concord. New York City: Norton. ISBN 0-393-00194-6.
- Urban, Mark (2007). Fusiliers: Eight Years with the Red Coats in America. London: Faber and Faber. ISBN 978-0-571-22486-9. OCLC 153556036.
- Ward, Christopher (2011). The War of the Revolution. New York: Skyhorse Publishing. ISBN 978-1-61608-080-8.
- Wright, Jr., Robert K. (1983). The Continental Army, Army Lineage Series. Washington, D.C.: US Army Center of Military History, United States Army. ISBN 978-0-16-001931-9.
- "Maine Legal Holidays". Human Resources Policy and Practices Manual. Maine Bureau of Human Resources. Archived from the original on February 21, 2009.
- "Massachusetts Legal Holidays". Citizen Information Service. Secretary of the Commonwealth of Massachusetts.
- "Minute Man NHP Things To Do". National Park Service. Archived from the original on December 9, 2008.
- "NPS Museum Collections 'American Revolutionary War': Riflemen". Valley Forge National Historical Park. National Park Service Museum Collections. Archived from the original on May 24, 2007.
- "None". Time. April 28, 1975. Archived from the original on December 9, 2008.
- "Wisconsin Public School Observance Days". Wisconsin Department of Public Instruction. Archived from the original on February 8, 2009.
- Michel, Lou; Herbeck, Dan (2001). American Terrorist. New York: Regan Books. ISBN 978-0-06-039407-3. OCLC 1028037729. Originally published as: Michel, Lou; Dan Herbeck (2001). "American Terrorist". Scientific American. Vol. 284, no. 6. p. 28. Bibcode:2001SciAm.284f..28D. doi:10.1038/scientificamerican0601-28. PMID 11396336.
