= Col. James Barrett Farm =

- U.S. National Register of Historic Places
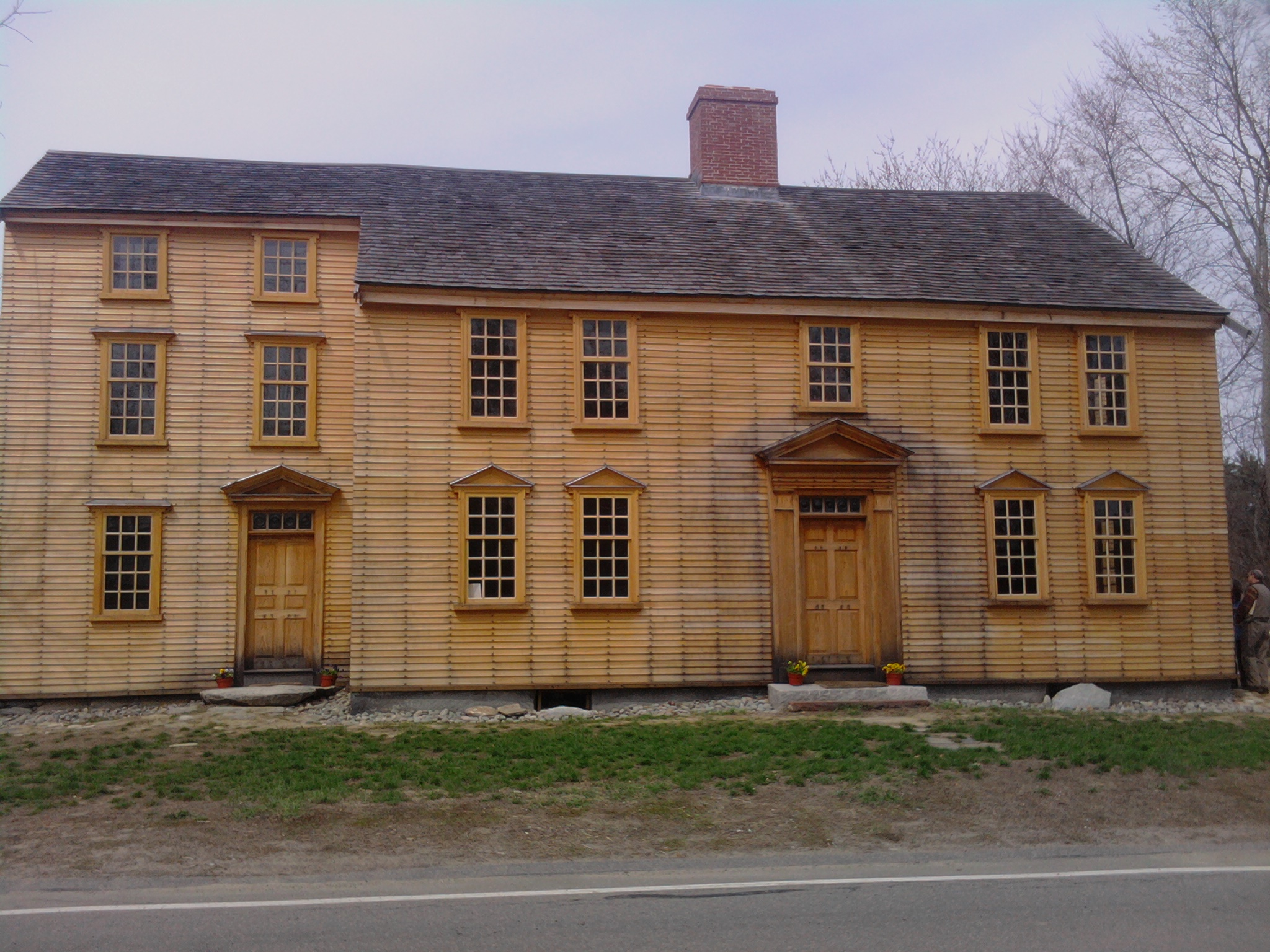
- The Barrett Farmhouse

- Location within Massachusetts Location within the United States
- Location: Concord, Massachusetts
- Coordinates: 42°28′22.53″N 71°22′50.86″W
- Built: 1705 (321 years ago)
- NRHP reference No.: 73000290
- Added to NRHP: November 15, 1973

The Col. James Barrett Farm (Barrett's Farm) is a historic American Revolutionary War site in Concord, Massachusetts, associated with the revolution's first battle, the 1775 battles of Lexington and Concord. His farm was the storage site of all the town of Concord's militia gunpowder, weapons and two pairs of prized bronze cannons.

== Background ==
James Barrett was Colonel of the Concord, Massachusetts, militia during the Battles of Lexington and Concord that began the American Revolutionary War. His farm was the storage site of all the town of Concord's militia gunpowder, weapons and two pairs of prized bronze cannons, according to secret British intelligence.

On the morning of April 19, 1775, the British Regulars were ordered by General Thomas Gage to march from Boston to the town of Concord, about 20 miles inland, and seize the cannon and raid the arsenal at the provincial farm. The British met resistance at both Lexington, Massachusetts and Concord. Before the British arrived and searched, the stores had been concealed in a field nearby, and the British never found them.

The farm was built in 1705 and added to the National Register of Historic Places in 1973. The farmhouse was in disrepair and was restored over eight years by Save Our Heritage. The restoration was funded by local and private funding as well as a Department of the Interior grant.

In March 2009, Congress passed legislation to add Barrett's Farm to Minute Man National Historical Park. In August 2012, the National Park Service obtained ownership of the Barrett House and surrounding 3.4 acres from Save Our Heritage. In October, 2012 Minute Man National Historical Park and Save Our Heritage hosted a celebration of completion of the restoration and transfer of ownership of the Col. James Barrett House to the Minute Man Park. Congresswoman Niki Tsongas helped make Barrett's Farm part of the national park system and spoke at the event.

== See also ==
- National Register of Historic Places listings in Concord, Massachusetts
