= Historical reenactment in Concord and Lexington, Massachusetts =

Coordinates: 42°26′56″N 71°13′48″W

The towns of Concord and Lexington, Massachusetts, are the site of Minute Man National Historical Park, a park governed by the National Park Service. The most highly attended event in the park is the annual reenactment of the first shots of the Battles of Lexington and Concord, performed by the Lexington Minute Men Company and His Majesty's Tenth Regiment of Foot.

== History ==
On April 19, 1775, the Revolutionary War's first battle was fought on the Lexington Battle Green. Later, as public interest grew due to the bicentennial celebration of the American Revolutionary War, volunteers began to reenact that battle every Patriots' Day. The Lexington Minutemen, the militia group that fought in the original battle, took the roles of the Minutemen. However, it was not until 1971 that the American Contingent of the Tenth Regiment of Foot was founded to play the roles of the British military forces.

== Reenactment of the first battle of the Revolutionary War ==
The reenactment of the "shot heard round the world" begins at 5:30 in the morning, slightly before sunrise. The Minute Men begin on the Battle Green, while the British regulars march in. When he sees them, the captain of the Minute Men gives the others some brief words of encouragement, telling them "Steady, men! Steady, men! Stand your ground! Do not fire unless fired upon!". At 6:00 AM, the battle itself begins, and the British regulars quickly win.

== Other reenactments ==
The Lexington Historical Society also maintains certain historical sites in their original condition. They give tours of the buildings, and for some have staff in authentic colonial garb to answer questions and explain the lifestyle of the time. One such building is Munroe Tavern, where the British set up a makeshift hospital for injured soldiers.
