= Amos Doolittle =

American artist (1754–1832)

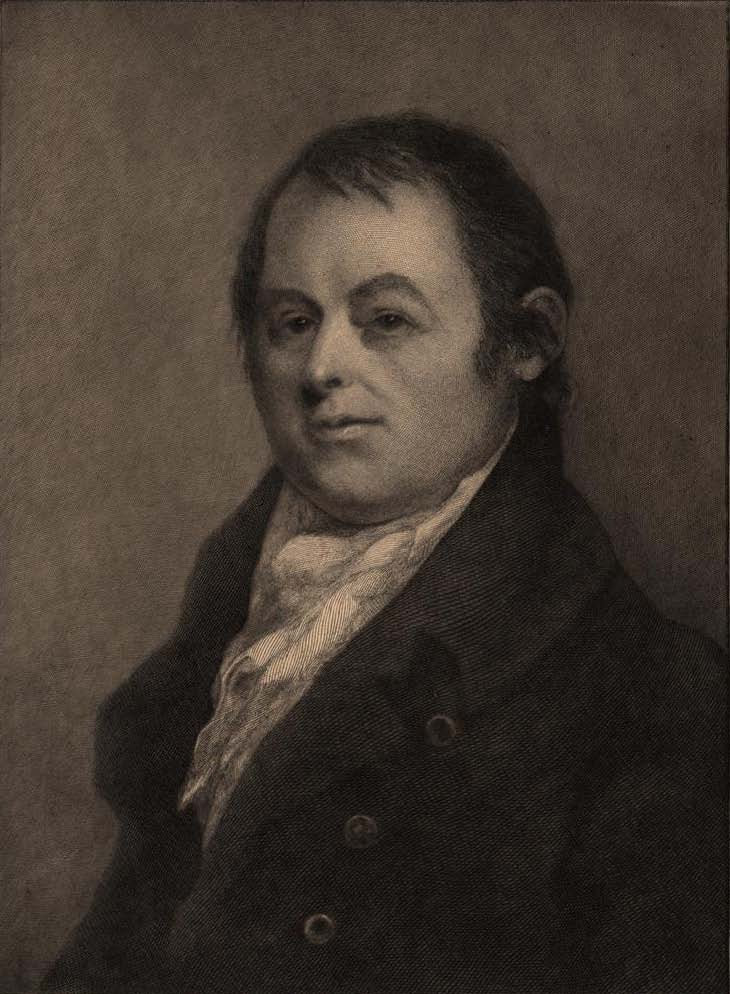
- Lithograph of Doolittle, following Ralph Earl's portrait
- Born: May 18, 1754; Cheshire, Connecticut Colony, Kingdom of Great Britain
- Died: January 30, 1832 (aged 77); Cheshire, Connecticut, U.S.
- Resting place: Grove Street Cemetery (New Haven, Connecticut, U.S.); 41.31374°N 72.92556°W
- Education: Self-taught
- Known for: Engraving
- Spouse(s): Sally (unknown–1797) and Phebe Tuttle (1797–1825)

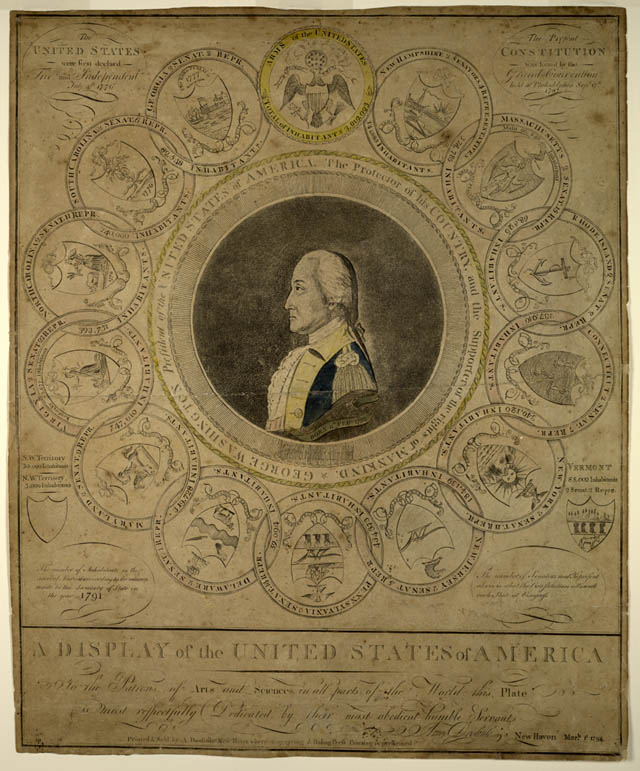

Amos Doolittle (May 18, 1754 – January 30, 1832) was an American engraver and silversmith, known as "The Revere of Connecticut." His engravings included portraits and maps, made in his New Haven, Connecticut studio. He became famous for his four engravings depicting the Battles of Lexington and Concord, which were based on his first-hand reconnaissance of the battlefield.

== Life and work ==
Born in Cheshire, Connecticut on May 18, 1754, Doolittle developed his skills in copper engraving through self-study and apprenticeship. His first published work in the medium emerged during his enlistment in the New Haven company of the Governor's Guards in 1775. Under the leadership of Captain Benedict Arnold, the company arrived in Cambridge, Massachusetts ten days after the Battles of Lexington and Concord, marking the outset of the Revolutionary War. Upon arrival, Doolittle obtained leave to inspect the battle site, accompanied by Ralph Earl. Doolittle conducted interviews with colonial militants and local residents to establish the scene while Earl surveyed the site and made drawings. From these drawings, Doolittle made at least four engraved copper prints of the battle, which were advertised for sale in the December 1775 Connecticut Journal.

== Gallery ==
Engravings of Battles of Lexington and Concord

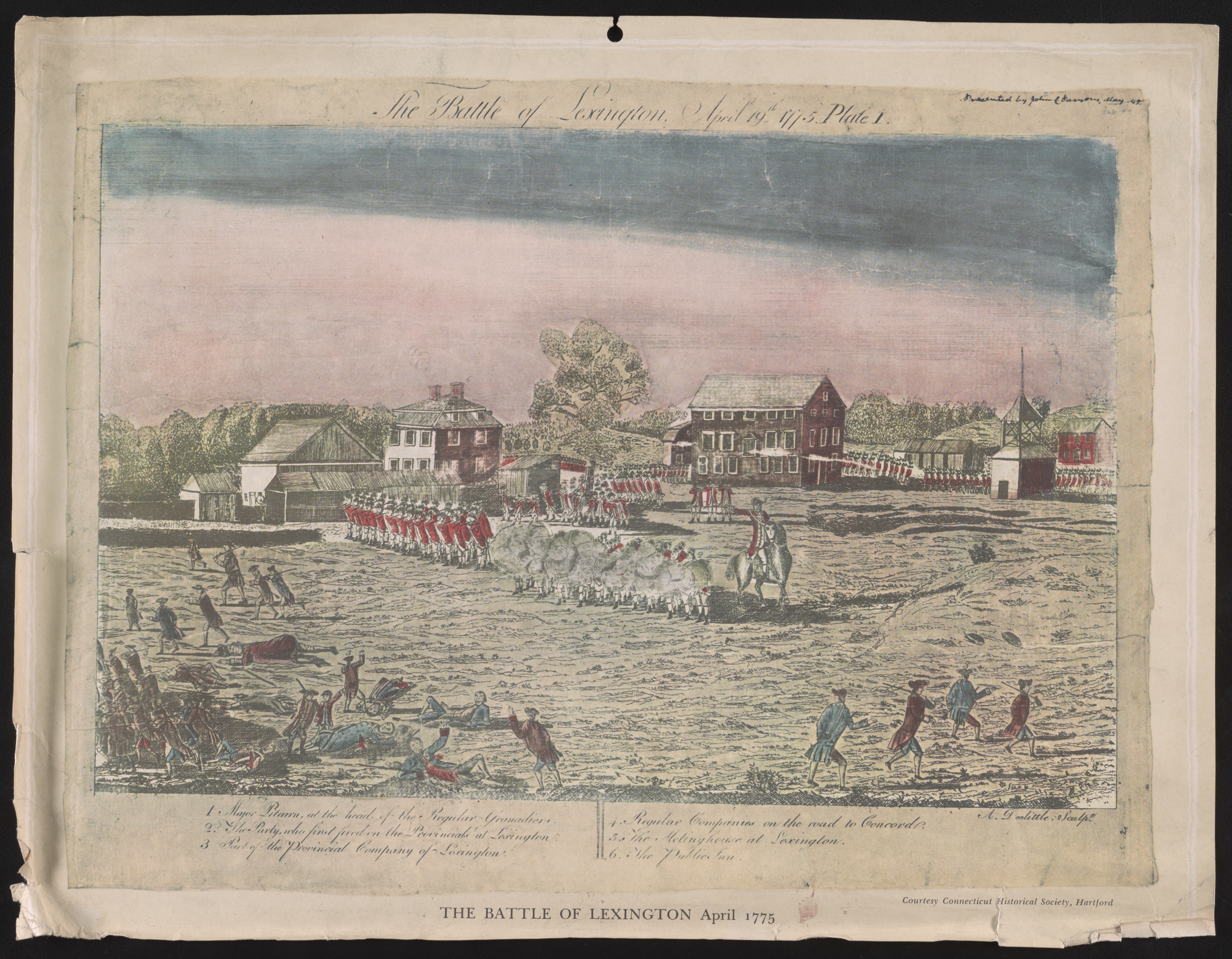
The Battle of Lexington

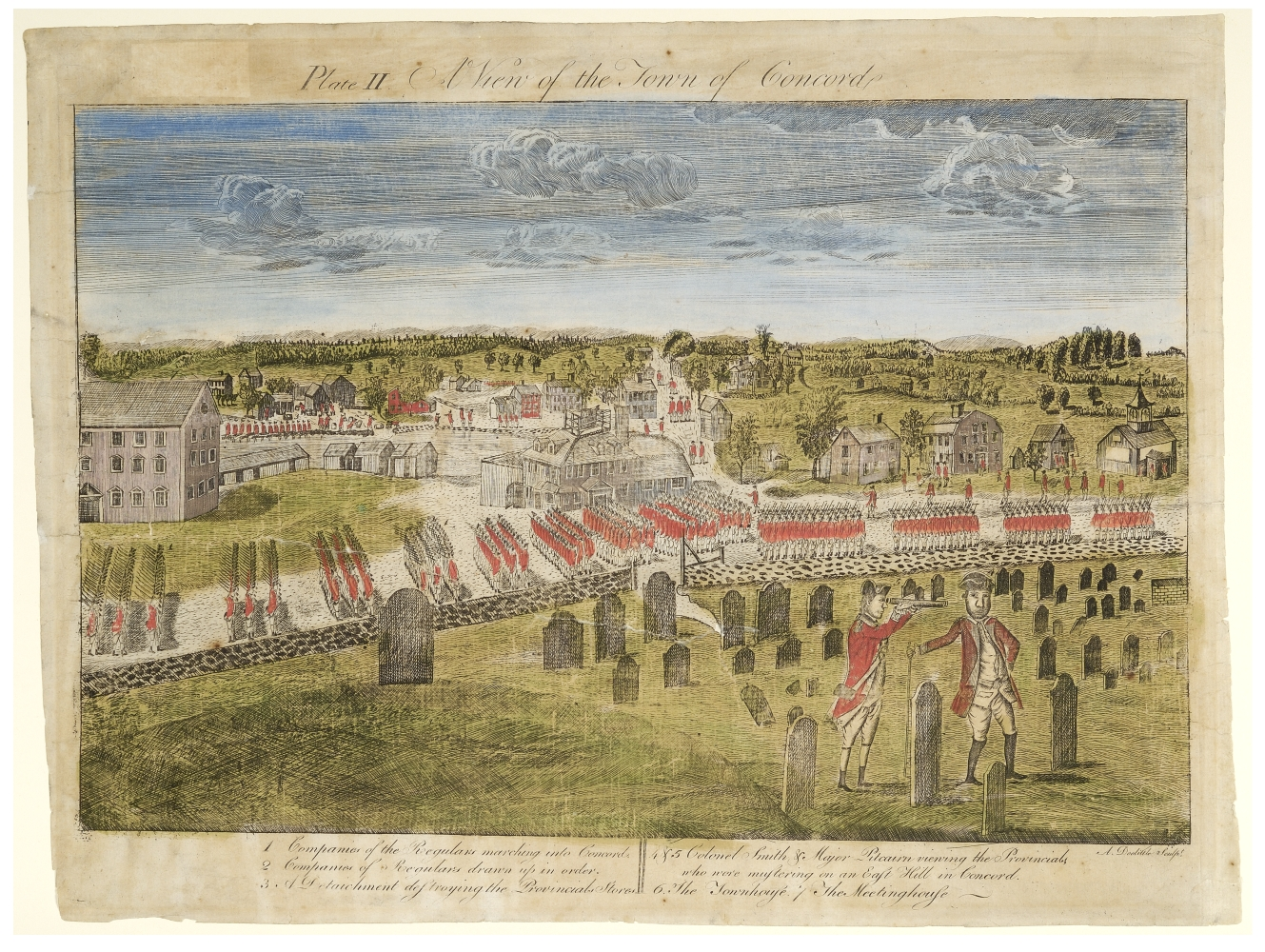
The British entering Concord

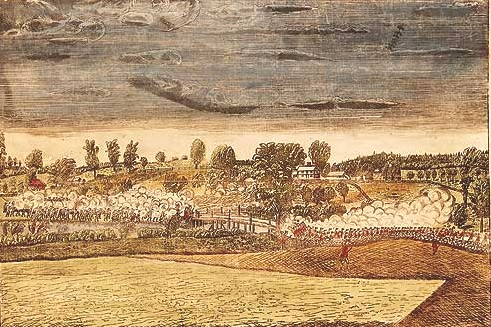
The engagement at the North Bridge

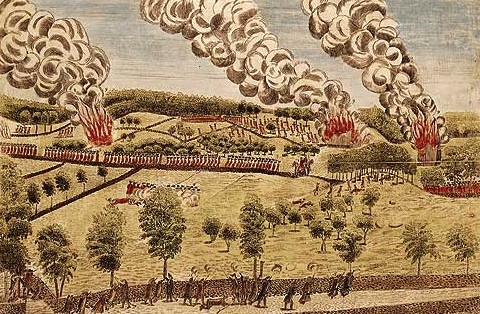
The British retreating from Lexington

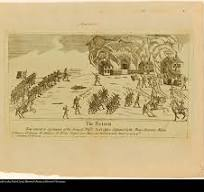
Political Cartoon on the British Retreat from Concord 1775 (possibly by Amos Doolittle)
