= James Barrett (colonel) =

American soldier

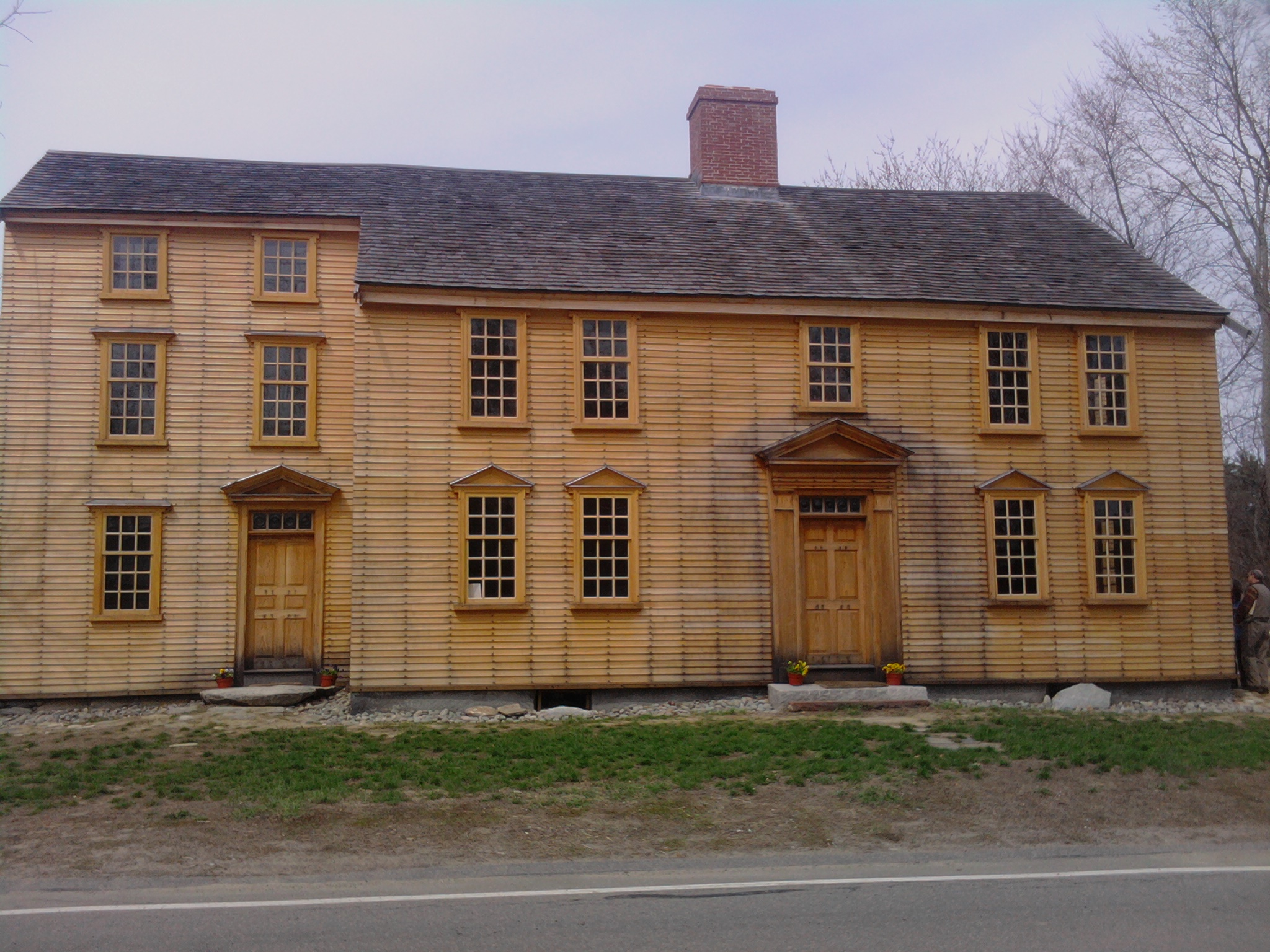
- Col. James Barrett Farm in Concord, Massachusetts.
- Born: July 31, 1710; Concord, Massachusetts Bay
- Died: April 11, 1779 (aged 68); Concord, Massachusetts Bay
- Military career
- Rank: Colonel
- Conflicts: French and Indian War; American Revolutionary War; Battles of Lexington and Concord

Coat of Arms of James Barrett

James Barrett (July 31, 1710 – April 11, 1779) was an American colonel in the Concord, Massachusetts militia during the Battles of Lexington and Concord that began the American Revolutionary War. His farm was the storage site of all the town of Concord's militia gunpowder, weapons and two pairs of prized bronze cannons, according to secret British intelligence.

On the morning of April 19, 1775, the British Regulars were ordered by General Thomas Gage to march from Boston to the town of Concord, about 20 miles inland, and seize the cannon and raid the arsenal at the provincial farm. The British met resistance at both Lexington, Massachusetts and Concord. Before the British arrived and searched, the stores had been concealed in a field nearby, and the British never found them. He is survived by the numerous members of the Barrett family found worldwide. He is buried in Old Hill Burying Ground, Concord, Massachusetts.

Col. James Barrett's farm has appeared in works such as: "Sons of Liberty", Season 1, Episode 2, "The Uprising" and Assassin's Creed III.
