= William Smith (patriot) =

American soldier

- Born: December 1, 1746; Charlestown, Province of Massachusetts Bay
- Died: September 3, 1787 (aged 40) Philadelphia, Pennsylvania, U.S.
- Allegiance: Kingdom of Great Britain; Massachusetts Bay
- Branch: Massachusetts Militia
- Rank: Captain
- Conflicts: American Revolutionary War; Battles of Lexington and Concord

William Smith (December 1, 1746 – September 3, 1787) was a captain of the minute men of Lincoln, Province of Massachusetts Bay, on April 19, 1775, during the battles that began the American Revolutionary War.

Smith's home, today known as the Captain William Smith House, still stands on North County Road, beside Battle Road, in Minute Man National Historical Park. It was there, in the early hours of April 19, 1775, that he was alerted to the impending passage of British troops en route to nearby Concord.

== Early life ==
Smith was born in 1746 in Weymouth, Province of Massachusetts Bay, to Revd. William Smith (1707–1783) and Elizabeth (née Quincy) Smith. He was the only brother of Abigail Adams, wife of future second president of the United States John Adams. On his mother's side, he was descended from the Quincy family, a well-known political family in the Massachusetts colony. Also through his mother, he was a cousin of Dorothy Quincy, who was married to John Hancock. Smith was also the great-grandson of John Norton, founding pastor of Old Ship Church in Hingham, Massachusetts, the only remaining 17th-century Puritan meetinghouse in Massachusetts.

== Opening Battles of the American Revolution ==
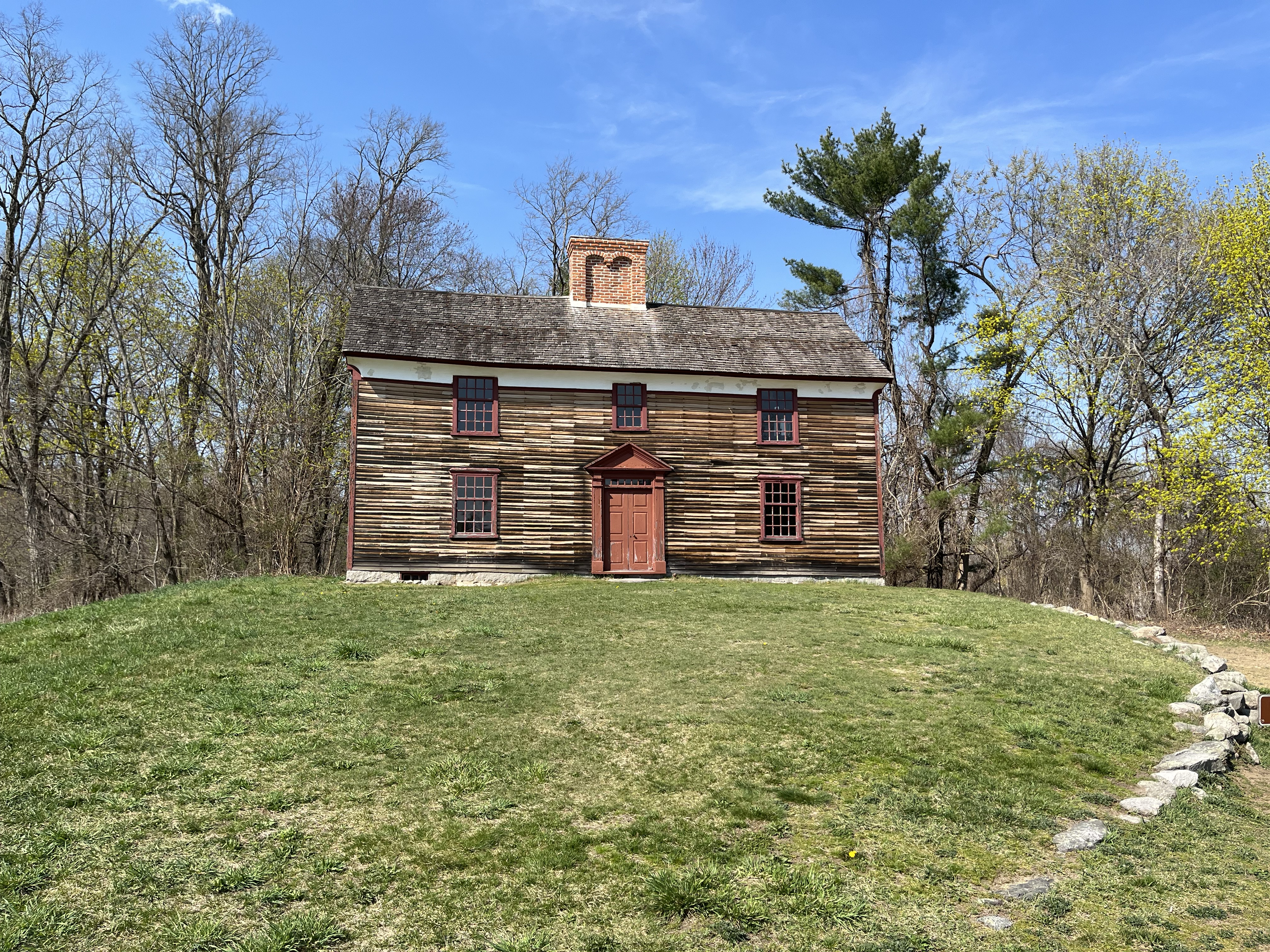
Captain William Smith House (2023)

The opening battles of the Revolution took form before dawn on April 19, 1775. British soldiers passed by Smith's house on their way to Concord, and again on their way back to Boston.

Paul Revere and William Dawes were detained by a British Army patrol nearby during the "Midnight Ride" to Concord. Samuel Prescott, who was also riding with them, escaped by jumping his horse over a wall and into the woods. Prescott emerged near the Hartwell Tavern, awakened the Hartwell household and told of the pending arrival of the British soldiers. Ephraim Hartwell sent his black slave, Violet Thayer, down the road to alert his son, Samuel, who was a sergeant in the minute men. Members of Samuel's household then relayed the message to William Smith. Smith then rode to the center of Lincoln, and after assuring that his minute men were assembling to march, he then rode on the Concord. The Lincoln minute men and militia were among the first of neighboring towns to arrive at Concord, well before the British soldiers. Prescott had made it to Concord, and Concord's own soldiers were already assembling.

Some time after the clash at the Old North Bridge in Concord, the British soldiers began their return to Boston. About a mile from Concord center, another brief clash occurred at Meriam's Corner and then a much more deadly and sustained engagement began at Elm Brook Hill in Lincoln:

"The running battle back to Boston passed by Smith's house around 1:30 p.m., and a British regular who was wounded nearby was left in the care of Catharine Louisa, Captain Smith's wife. Despite her best efforts and those of Lexington physician Joseph Fiske, the soldier died of his wounds two or three days later, and he was buried near the farmhouse." – National Park Service

== Personal life ==
In 1771, Smith married Catharine Louisa Salmon, daughter of William and Elizabeth Dodge. At the time, William's merchantile business in Boston was failing and would soon be bankrupt. Fortunately, prior to Catharine's marriage, her parents had gifted a house, today's Captain William Smith House, and 120 acres of land in Lincoln to her. So William and Catharine moved there in 1774 with their three children: Elizabeth, Louisa Catharine and William Jr. To shield the house and farm from William's creditors, he agreed to transfer ownership to his father, Rev. William Smith.

Also in William and Catharine's household was their African slave, Cato. Cato was probably not engaged in the battles on April 19th, but on April 24, 1775, he enlisted as a soldier in Smith's newly formed company in the 6th Massachusetts Regiment commanded by Colonel John Nixon. Cato soon after enlisted in the Continental Army. His regiment participated in the Battle of Trenton and the Battle of Princeton in December 1776. Cato died in January 1777, possibly of wounds suffered at Princeton.

In 1776, William Smith sought a commission as an officer in the Continental Army at a higher rank than captain, and when that proved unsuccessful, he left the army. In 1777, he signed on as a captain of marines aboard a privateer ship. The ship's raids on British vessels in the North Atlantic proved very successful, and William was put in charge of one of the captured ships, to sail it back to Boston with much of the captured goods. The ship was intercepted by the British Navy, however, and Smith was briefly imprisoned in Halifax, Nova Scotia, before being released in a prisoner exchange. He returned to his home and family in Lincoln, but then proved unsuccessful at farming. By then, his alcoholism had probably taken over his life. In late 1780, he abandoned his family and apparently re-enlisted in the army. At the end of the war, he briefly sought to return to his family in Lincoln, but was not welcomed and sent away.

== Death ==
William Smith's location when he died in September 1787 is unknown, although it was probably near New York. He was 40 years old, and he died of black jaundice (leptospirosis).

William Smith's father had died in 1783, but in his will, he had arranged for Catharine and the children to remain on the farm in Lincoln, with the land rented out for income. Catharine remained in Lincoln until 1795, then moved to a house in Quincy, Massachusetts, owned by John and Abigail Adams. She died in 1824 at the age of 75 and lies in the Adams family vault in Quincy, Massachusetts.
