= Captain William Smith House =

Colonial building in Massachusetts

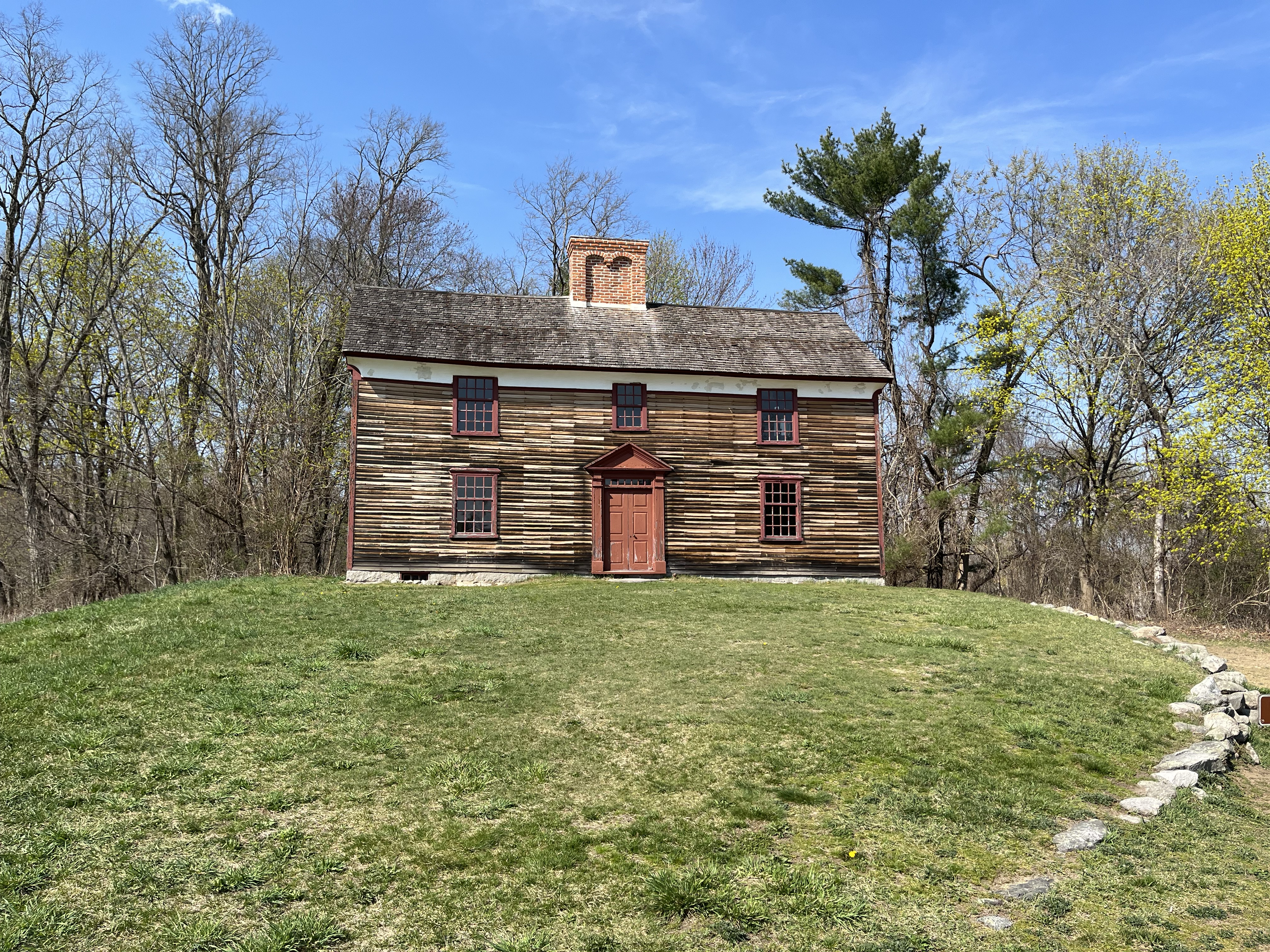
- The house in 2023
- Interactive map of the Captain William Smith House area

General information
- Architectural style: Colonial
- Location: Lincoln, Massachusetts, U.S. (Concord until 1754), North County Road
- Coordinates: 42.45086°N 71.28857°W
- Completed: 1692 (334 years ago)

Technical details
- Floor count: 4 (including the cellar)

Design and construction
- Main contractor: Benjamin Whittmore

The Captain William Smith House is a historic American Revolutionary War site in Lincoln, Massachusetts, United States. Part of today's Minute Man National Historic Park, it is associated with the revolution's first battle, the 1775 battles of Lexington and Concord. Believed to have been built in 1692 (or possibly a decade or so earlier), in what was then Concord, it is believed to be the oldest house in Lincoln.

It is located on North County Road, just off Battle Road (formerly the Bay Road), a few hundred yards east of the Hartwell Tavern and the contemporary Samuel Hartwell House. Its first known occupant was yeoman Benjamin Whittemore (d. 1734). It was latterly the home of Captain William Smith (1746–1787), commanding officer of the Lincoln minutemen and the only brother of Abigail Adams, wife of the prominent patriot John Adams. The house has been restored by National Park Service to look as it would have in 1775.

William and Elizabeth Dodge purchased the home as a rental property in 1758. When they moved to New Hampshire, they gave the house to their only daughter, Catharine Louisa Salmon. Catharine married William Smith in 1771. The couple lived in the house with their three children: Elizabeth, Louisa Catharine and William Jr. Their African slave, Cato, is not believed to have fought in the battles of Lexington and Concord, but on April 24, 1775, he enlisted as a soldier in Smith's newly formed company in the 6th Massachusetts Regiment commanded by Colonel John Nixon. He died in New Castle, New York, in January 1777.

Smith died in Philadelphia on September 3, 1787, aged 40, after abandoning his wife and (now six) children and becoming an alcoholic. Smith's father, Revd. William Smith, had assumed ownership of the family house in 1780. Catharine, who left Lincoln in 1795, survived her husband by 37 years; she died in 1824.

The house had a series of owners before it was added to the Minute Man National Historic Park in 1975. (Manuel Silva purchased the property in 1924. A hog farmer, Silva had about four hundred swine at the time of his 1945 death. It is believed his wife divided the interior into four apartments around 1956.)

== Architecture ==
The cove cornice visible below the roofline of the front façade is one of only four surviving examples remaining in Massachusetts (the others are the nearby Whittemore-Smith House, and also in Danvers and Marblehead).

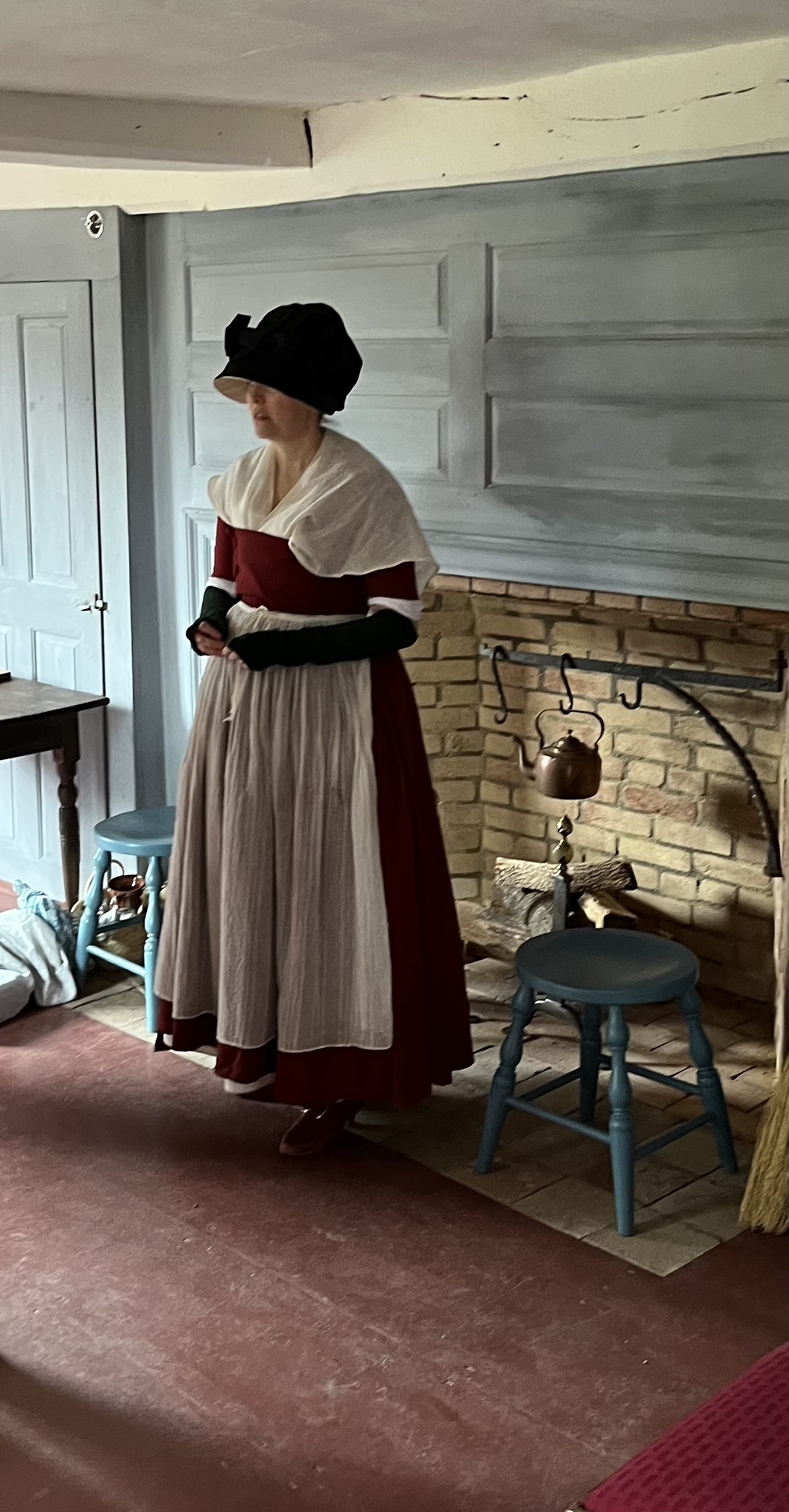
A period reenactor in the house's west parlor

=== Battles of Lexington and Concord ===
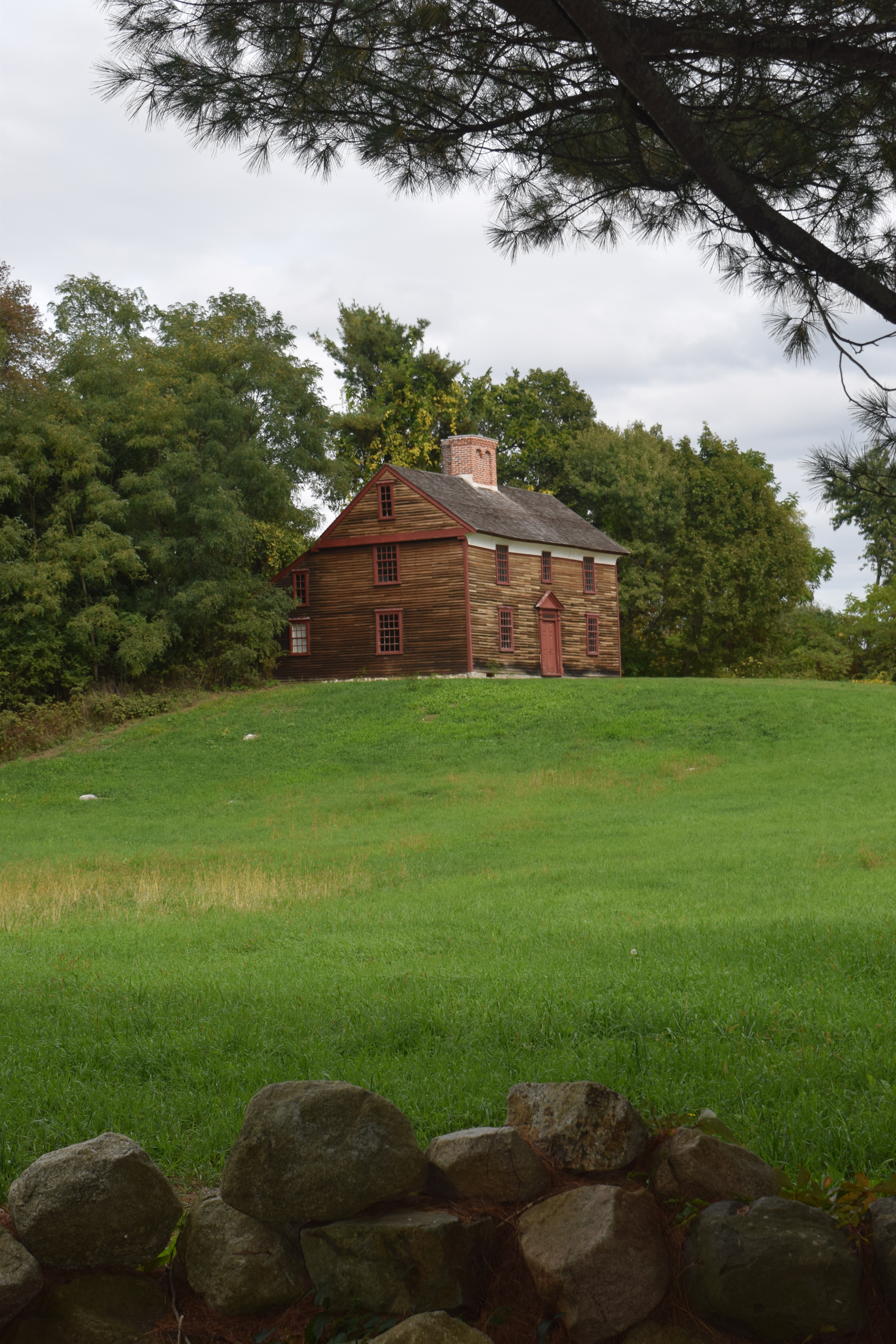
This view, looking northeast from Swamp Meadow, showing the house on a knoll

The battles of Lexington and Concord took form before dawn on April 19, 1775. Soldiers passed by the house on their way to Concord, and again on their way back to Boston. Three of Ephraim and Elizabeth Hartwell's children — Samuel, John and Isaac — were in the Lincoln minutemen that fought at Old North Bridge and on the battle road. All three later served in the Revolutionary War.

Paul Revere and William Dawes were detained by a British Army patrol nearby during the "Midnight Ride" to Concord of April 18. Samuel Prescott, who was also riding with them, escaped by jumping his horse over a wall and into the woods. Prescott emerged at the Hartwell Tavern, awakened Ephraim and informed him of the pending arrival of the British soldiers. Ephraim sent his black slave, Violet, down the road to alert his son, Samuel, and his family. Mary Hartwell, Samuel's wife, then relayed the message to Captain William Smith. The minutemen received the notice in time, and arrived at Old North Bridge before their enemy. Prescott made it to Concord.

"The running battle back to Boston passed by Smith's house around 1:30 p.m., and a British regular who was wounded nearby was left in the care of Catharine Louisa, Captain Smith's wife. Despite her best efforts and those of Lexington physician Joseph Fiske, the soldier died of his wounds two or three days later, and he was buried near the farmhouse." – National Park Service
