= Samuel Hartwell House =

Remains of a colonial building in Massachusetts

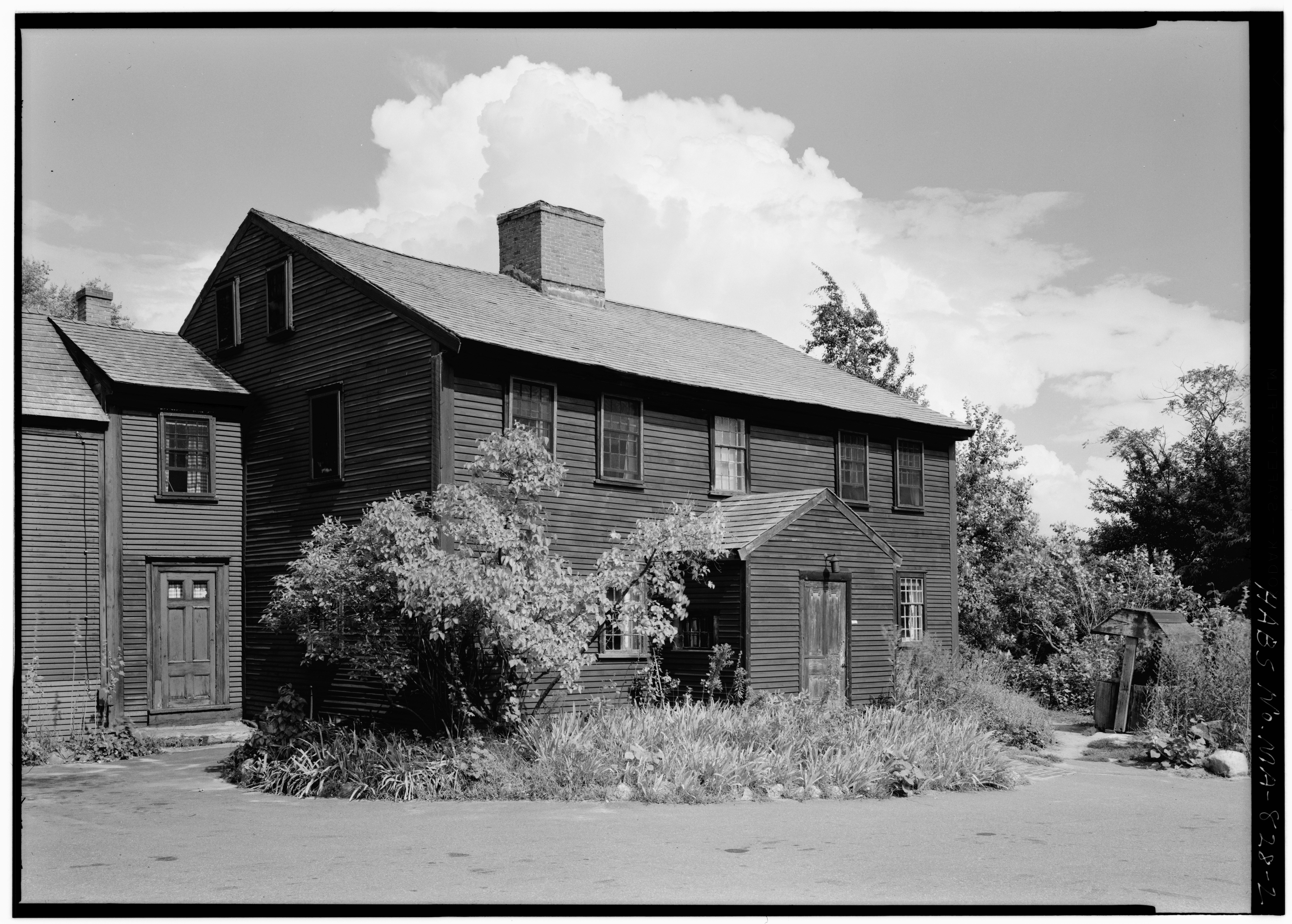
- The house in the 1960s, around ten years before its destruction
- Interactive map of the Samuel Hartwell House area

General information
- Location: Lincoln, Massachusetts, US (Concord until 1754), North County Road
- Coordinates: 42.4527°N 71.2910°W
- Completed: 1733 (293 years ago)
- Destroyed: February 1968 (58 years ago) (fire)

Technical details
- Floor count: 3 (including the cellar)

The Samuel Hartwell House is a historic American Revolutionary War site associated with the revolution's first battle, the 1775 battles of Lexington and Concord. Built in 1733, in what was then Concord, it was located on North County Road, just off Battle Road (formerly the Bay Road) in today's Lincoln, Massachusetts, and about 700 feet east of Hartwell Tavern, which Hartwell built for his son, Ephraim, and his newlywed wife, Elizabeth, in 1733. The site is part of today's Minute Man National Historic Park.

The 240-year-old Samuel Hartwell House was destroyed by fire in February 1968, and all that remains is the central chimney stack.

== History ==
The building, whose main façade faces south, was originally constructed as a home for Samuel Hartwell and his first wife, Abigail Stearns. Built on land purchased in 1694 from Richard Rice, only the central chimney of the Samuel Hartwell House still stands, amongst a basic reconstruction of the building.

When Samuel died in 1744, aged 78, Ephraim inherited his portion of the family farm. By 1749, the farm was one of the most productive in Concord and consisted of 141 acres.

The property was part of Concord until 1754, when the town of Lincoln was incorporated.

After Samuel's grandson, also named Samuel, married Mary Flint in 1769, his father, Ephraim, gave him the house. The Hartwells lived there until 1785.

Thomas John Dee purchased the farm around the turn of the 20th century. After his death, it passed to his son, who sold the property and a few acres of its land in 1925 to Marion Abbie Fitch, a Boston schoolteacher, and Jane Hamilton Poor, an architect. They converted it into a restaurant called Hartwell Farm.

=== Remains ===
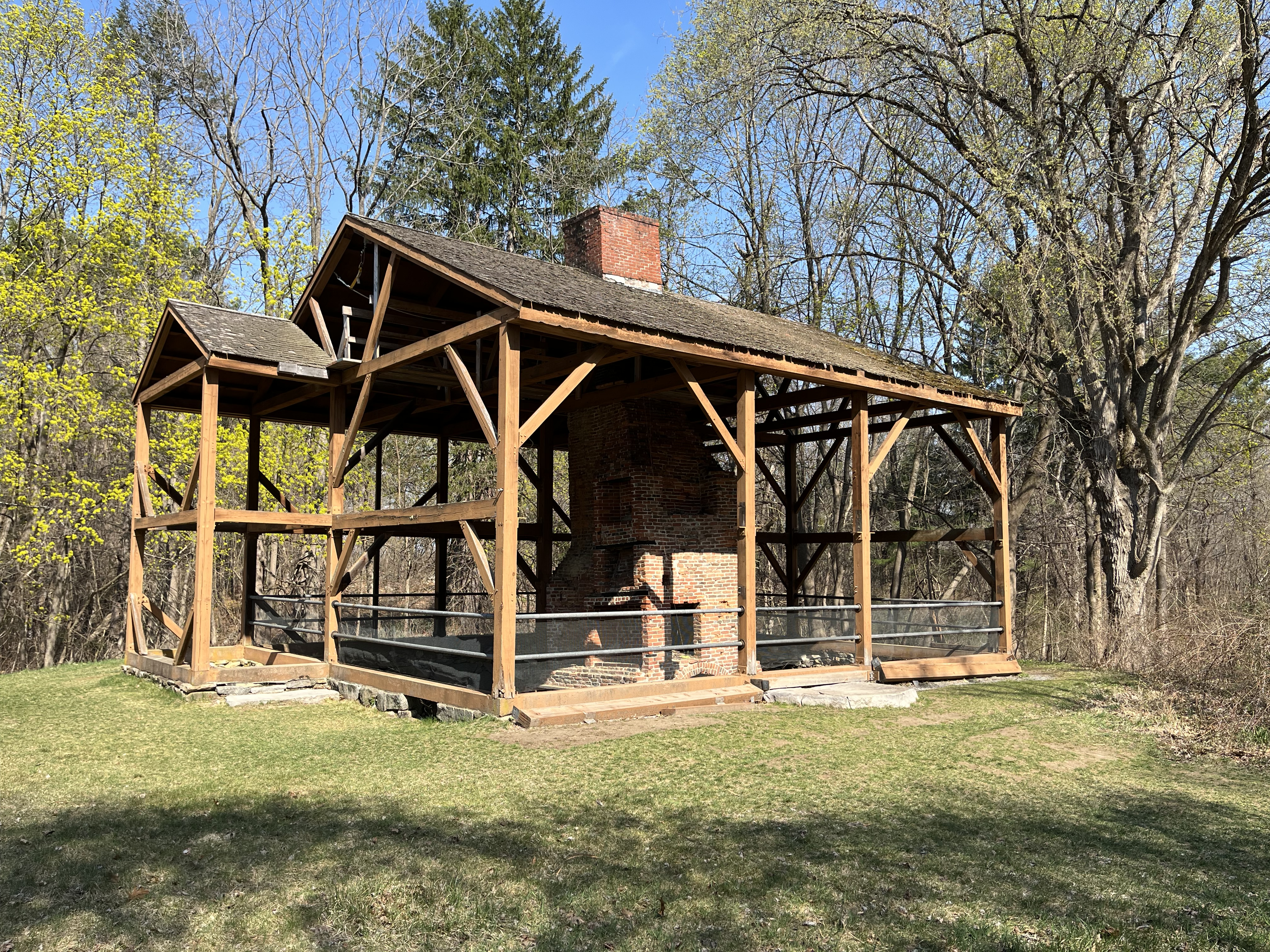
The remnants of the Samuel Hartwell House

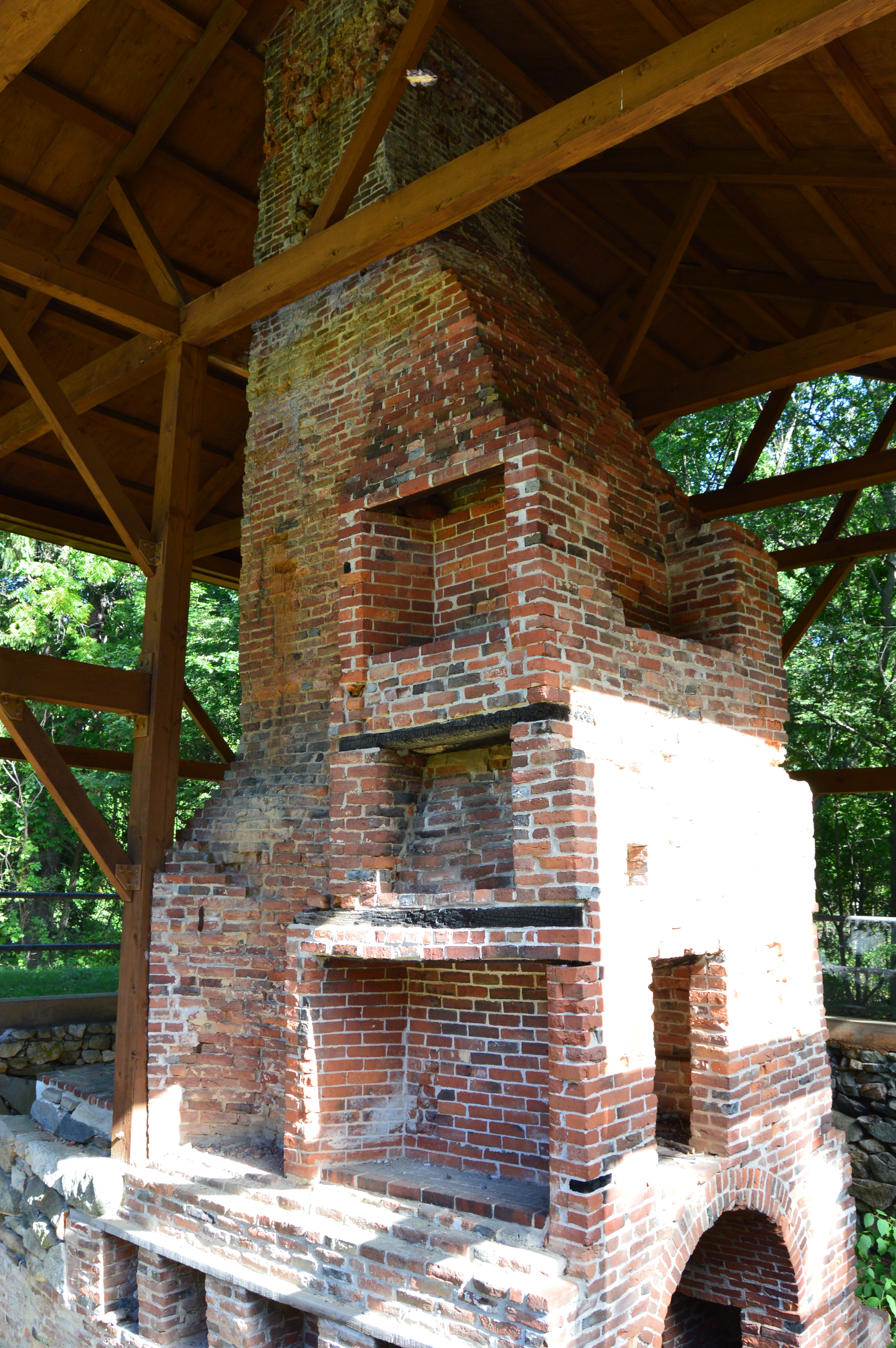
Chimney and hearth

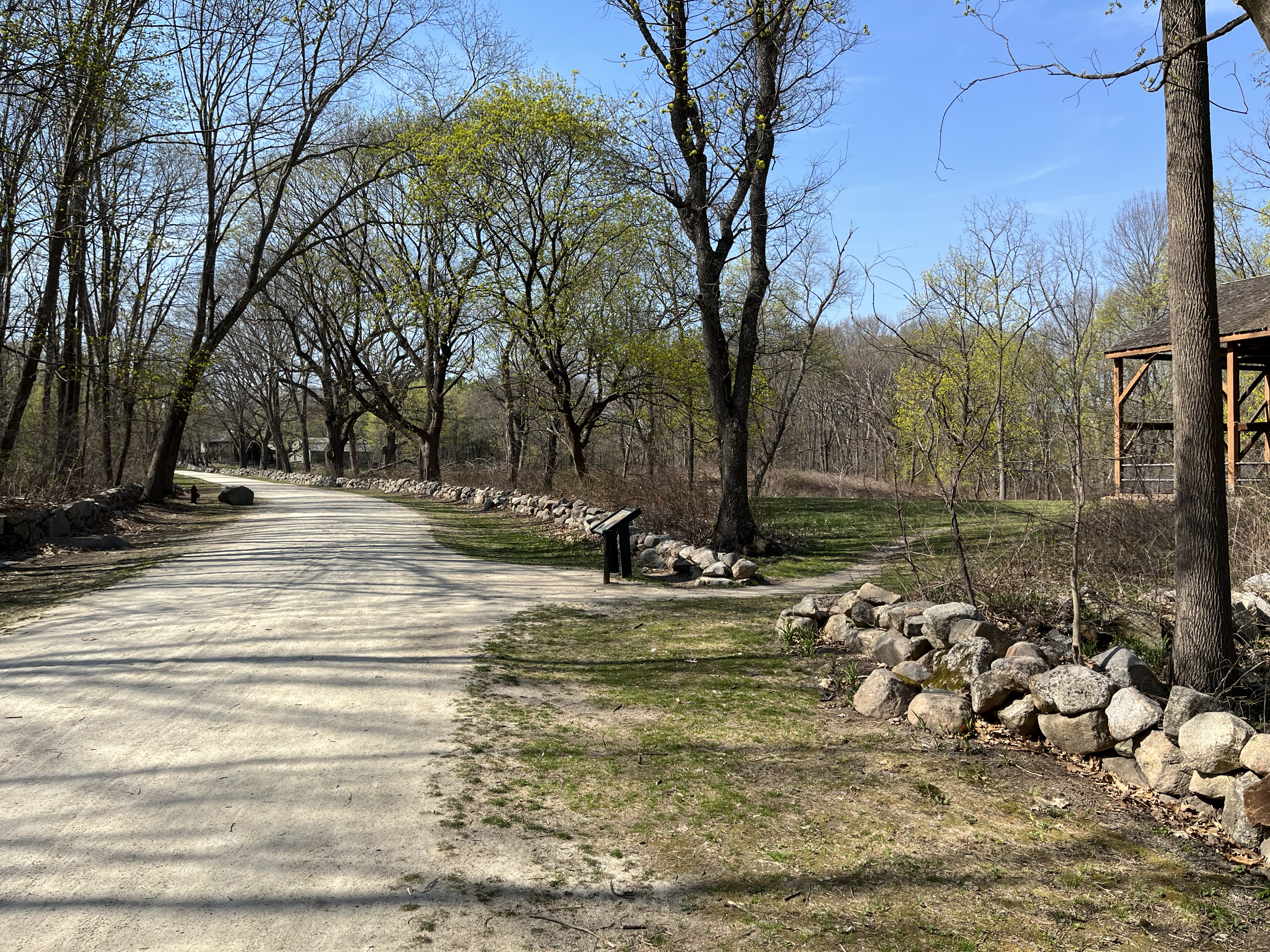
Looking west along Battle Road from the Samuel Hartwell House to Hartwell Tavern

=== Battles of Lexington and Concord ===
The battles of Lexington and Concord took form before dawn on April 19, 1775. Soldiers passed by the house on their way to Concord, and again on their way back to Boston. Three of Ephraim and Elizabeth Hartwell's children — Samuel, John and Isaac — were in the Lincoln minutemen that fought at Old North Bridge and on the battle road. All three later served in the Revolutionary War.

Paul Revere and William Dawes were detained by a British Army patrol nearby during the "Midnight Ride" to Concord of April 18. Samuel Prescott, who was also riding with them, escaped by jumping his horse over a wall and into the woods. Prescott emerged at the Hartwell Tavern, awakened Ephraim and informed him of the pending arrival of the British soldiers. Ephraim sent his black slave, Violet, down the road to alert his son and his family. Mary then relayed the message to Captain William Smith, commanding officer of the Lincoln minutemen, who lived a little to the west and whose home still stands along Battle Road. The minutemen received the notice in time, and arrived at Old North Bridge before their enemy. Prescott made it to Concord.
