= Hartwell Tavern =

Colonial building in Massachusetts

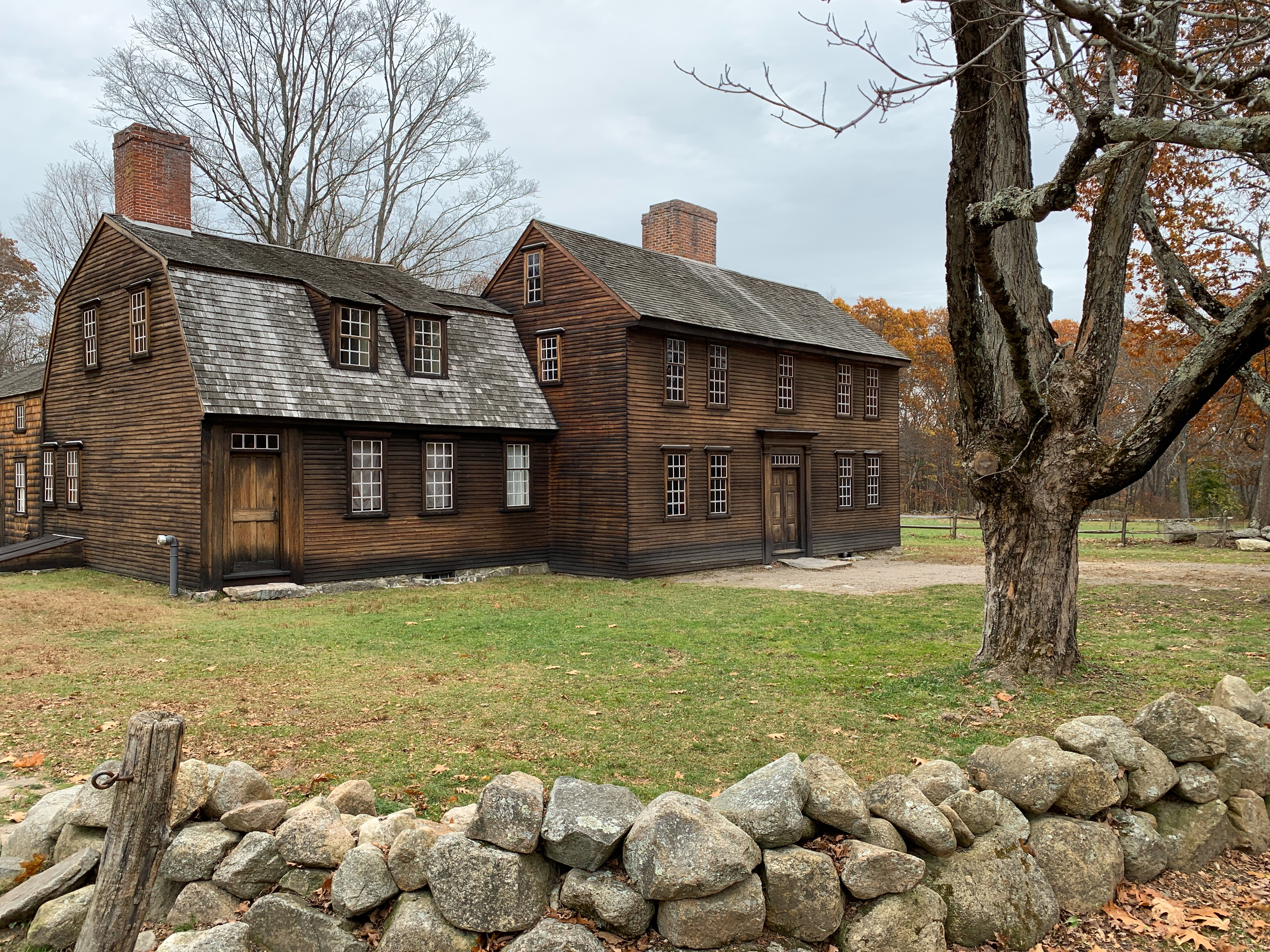
- Hartwell Tavern, pictured in 2019
- Interactive map of the Hartwell Tavern area
- Alternative names: Ephraim Hartwell House

General information
- Architectural style: Saltbox
- Location: Lincoln, Massachusetts (Concord until 1754), North County Road
- Coordinates: 42.4538°N 71.2932°W
- Construction started: 1732
- Completed: 1733 (293 years ago)

Technical details
- Floor count: 3 (including the cellar)

Hartwell Tavern (also known as the Ephraim Hartwell House) is a historic American Revolutionary War site associated with the revolution's first battle, the 1775 battles of Lexington and Concord. It is located on North County Road, just off Battle Road (formerly the Bay Road) in Lincoln, Massachusetts, and is operated as a historic house museum by the National Park Service as part of Minute Man National Historical Park. Built in 1733, in what was then Concord, it is staffed from Memorial Day weekend to October by park rangers dressed in colonial attire who offer programs daily.

The building is in the saltbox style.

== History ==
The building, whose main façade faces south, was originally constructed as a home for Ephraim Hartwell (1707–1793) and his newlywed wife, Elizabeth (1714–1808), in 1733. It was given to them by Ephraim's father, Samuel (1666–1744), who lived with his fourth wife, Experience, at what became known as the Samuel Hartwell House, located about 700 feet east along North County Road and which pre-dates the Hartwell Tavern by about forty years.

The Hartwells raised a family and, in 1756, when they had nine children living in the house, Ephraim applied for a license to run the home as an inn. It was run as such until the 1780s.

When Samuel died in 1744, Ephraim inherited his portion of the family farm. By 1749 the farm was one of the most productive in Concord and consisted of 141 acres.

The property was part of Concord until 1754, when the town of Lincoln was incorporated.

After Ephraim's son, Samuel, married Mary Flint in 1769, Ephraim gave him the house formerly owned by Samuel's namesake grandfather.

Ephraim died in 1793. Elizabeth survived her husband by fifteen years; she died in 1808. The tavern's ownership passed to the Hartwells' son, John.

The tavern continued to be a residence up until its purchase by the National Park Service in 1967. Over the years that followed, the building was modernized and changed.

In the 1980s, the Park Service restored it to its 1775 appearance, yet kept its 1783 and 1830 additions. The main structure, the foundation, most of the walls and some of the flooring are 1733 originals. It is estimated that about 65% of the original structure remains within the restored building.

The tavern's original sign is on display at Buckman Tavern in Lexington.

=== Battles of Lexington and Concord ===
The battles of Lexington and Concord took form before dawn on April 19, 1775. Soldiers passed by the tavern on their way to Concord, and again on their way back to Boston. Three of the Hartwells' children — Samuel, John and Isaac — were in the Lincoln minutemen that fought at Old North Bridge and on the battle road. All three later served in the Revolutionary War.

Paul Revere and William Dawes were detained by a British Army patrol nearby during the "Midnight Ride" to Concord of April 18. Samuel Prescott, who was also riding with them, escaped by jumping his horse over a wall and into the woods. Prescott emerged at the Hartwell Tavern, awakened Ephraim and informed him of the pending arrival of the British soldiers. Ephraim sent his black slave, Violet, down the road to alert his son and his family. Mary then relayed the message to Captain William Smith, commanding officer of the Lincoln minutemen, who lived a little to the west and whose home still stands along Battle Road. The minutemen received the notice in time, and arrived at Old North Bridge before their enemy. Prescott made it to Concord.

== Gallery ==
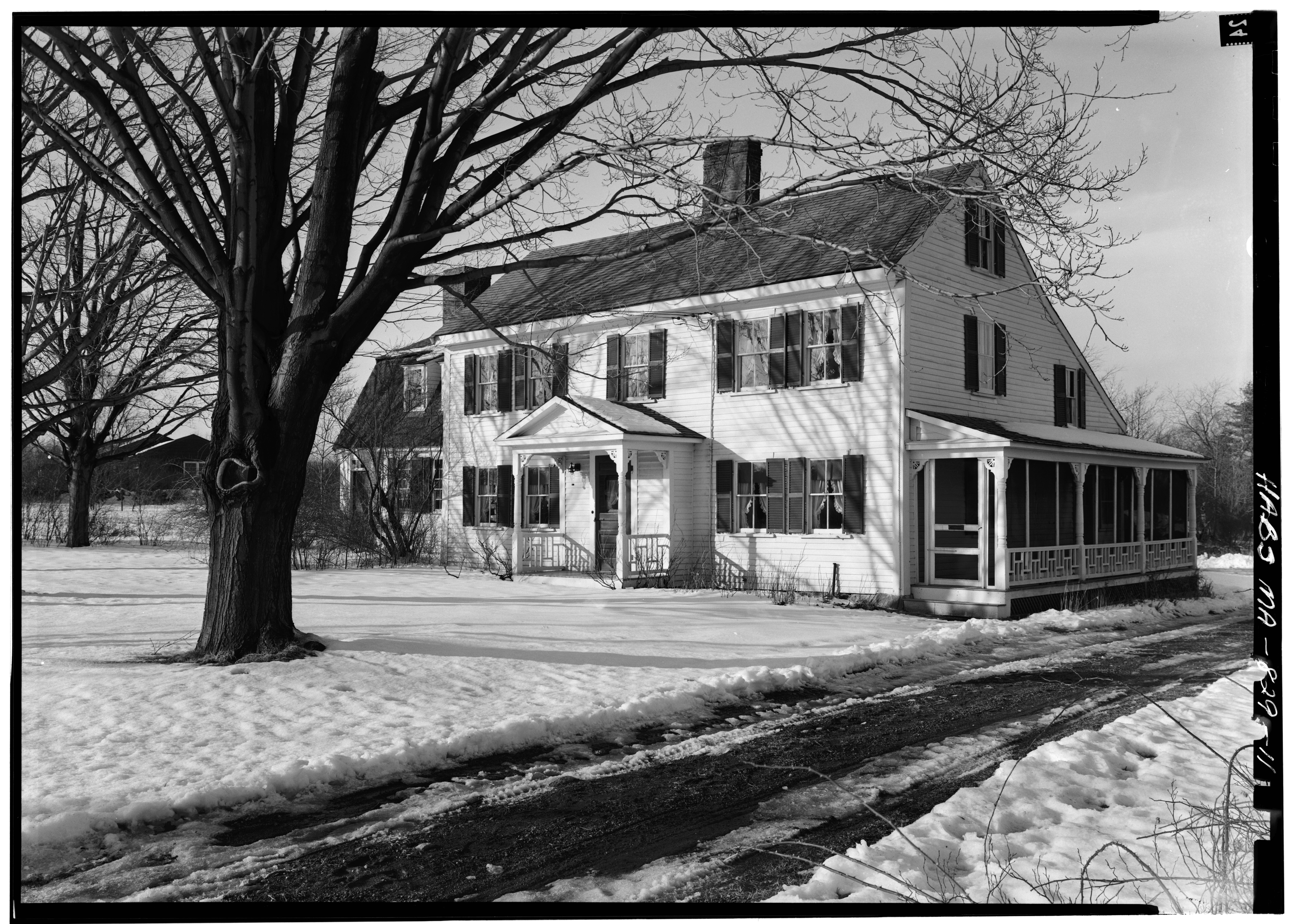
The Hartwell Tavern in the 1960s

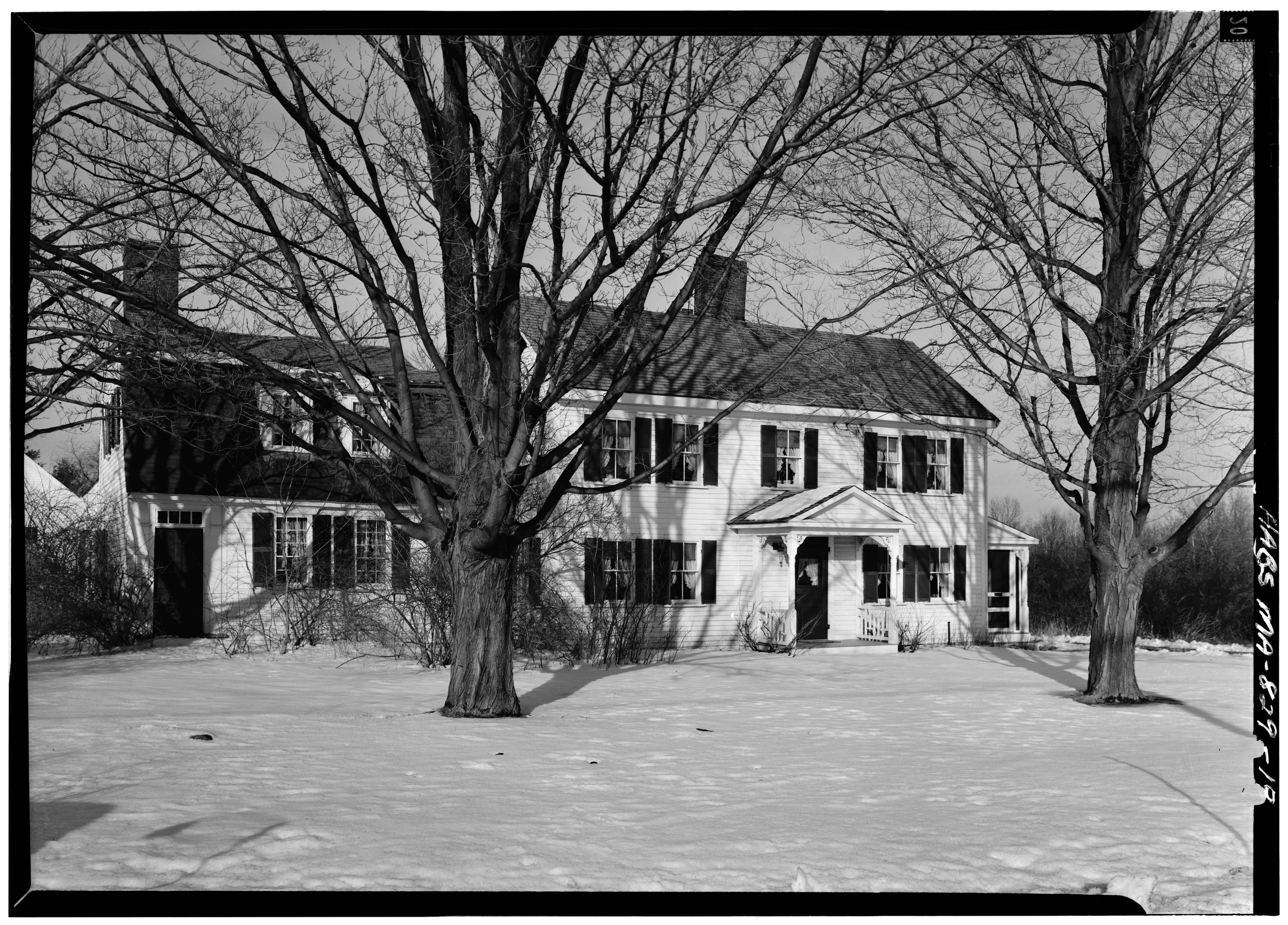
Another view of the south-facing façade

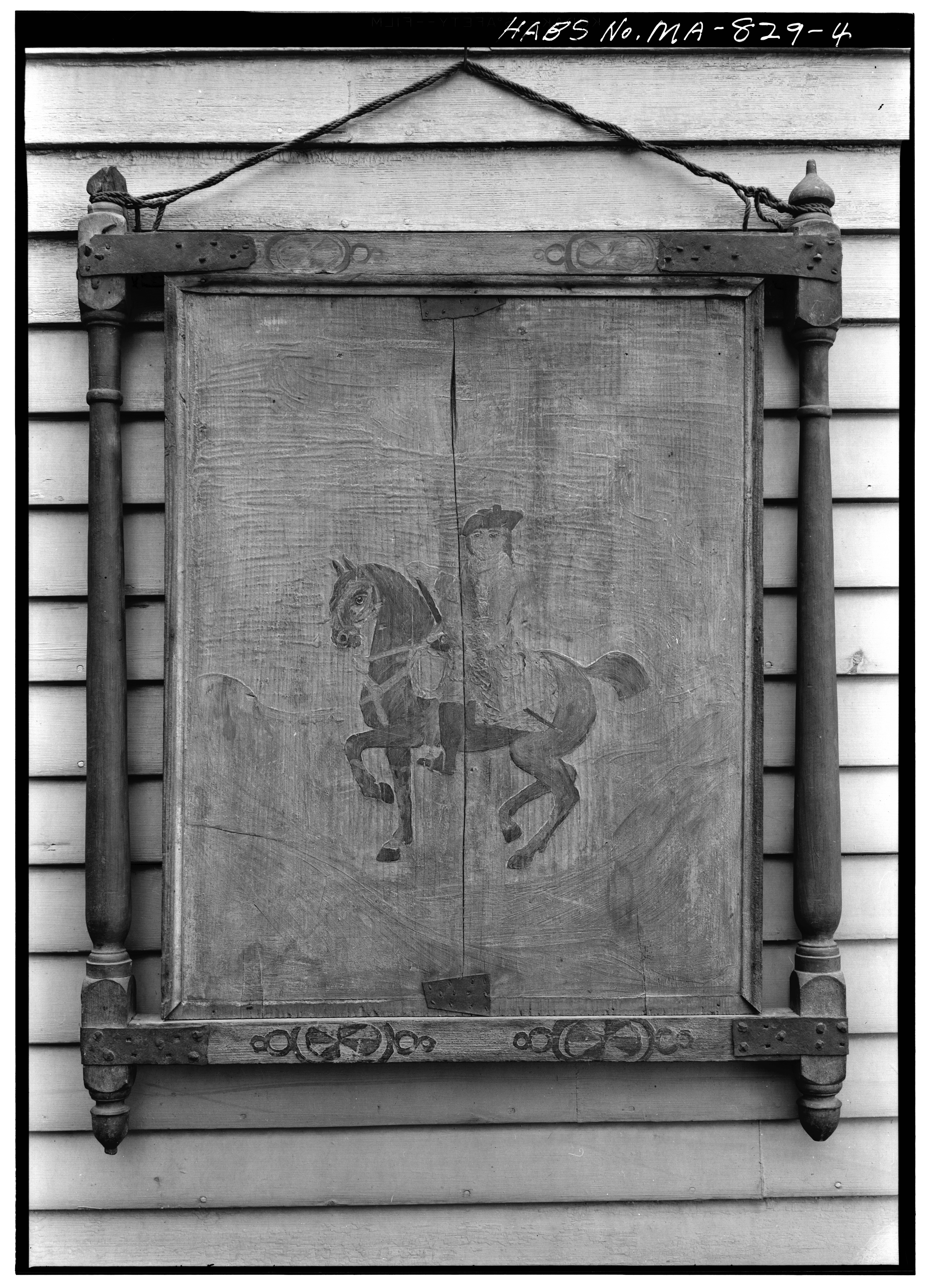
The tavern's sign

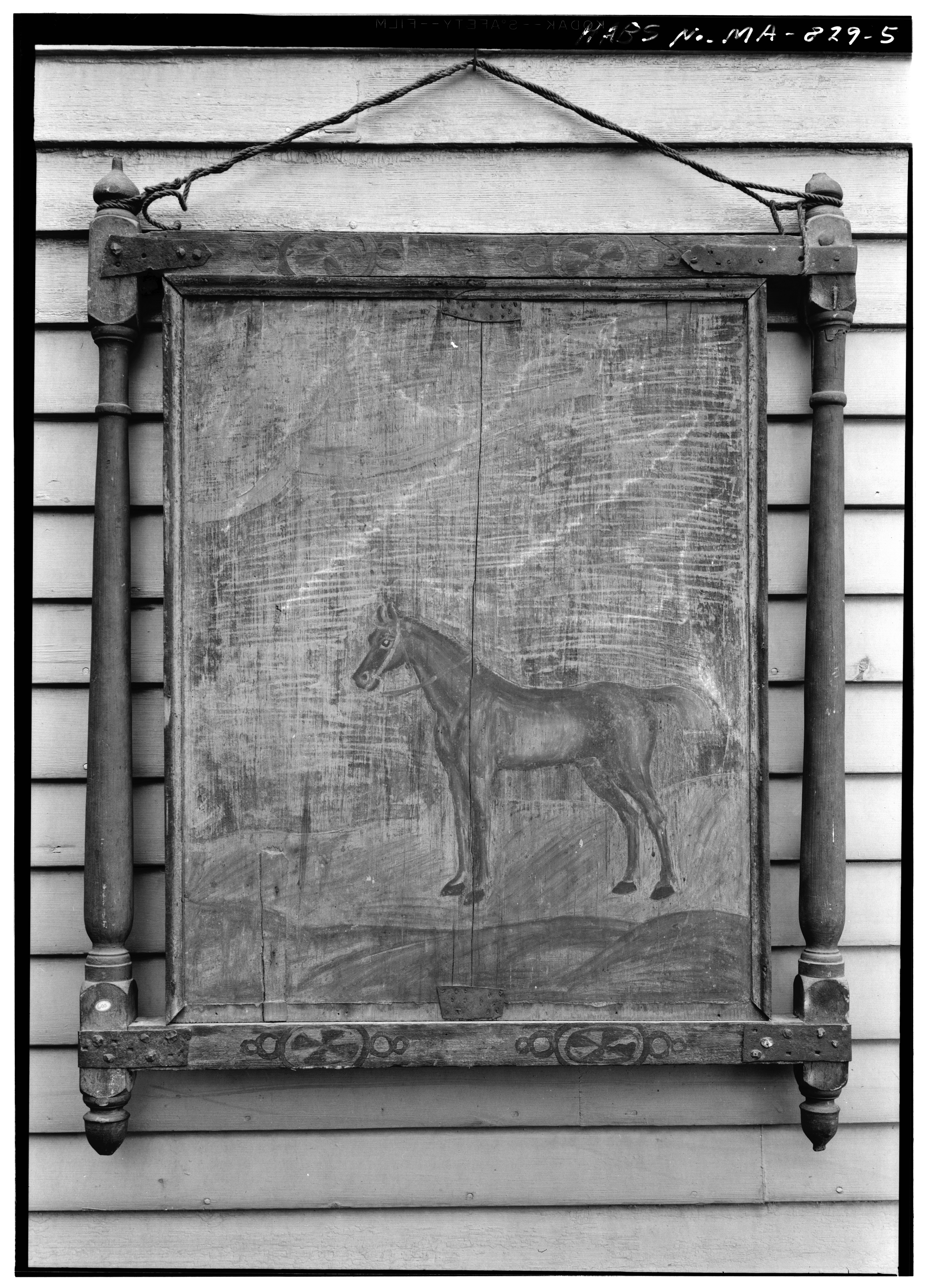
The reverse of the sign

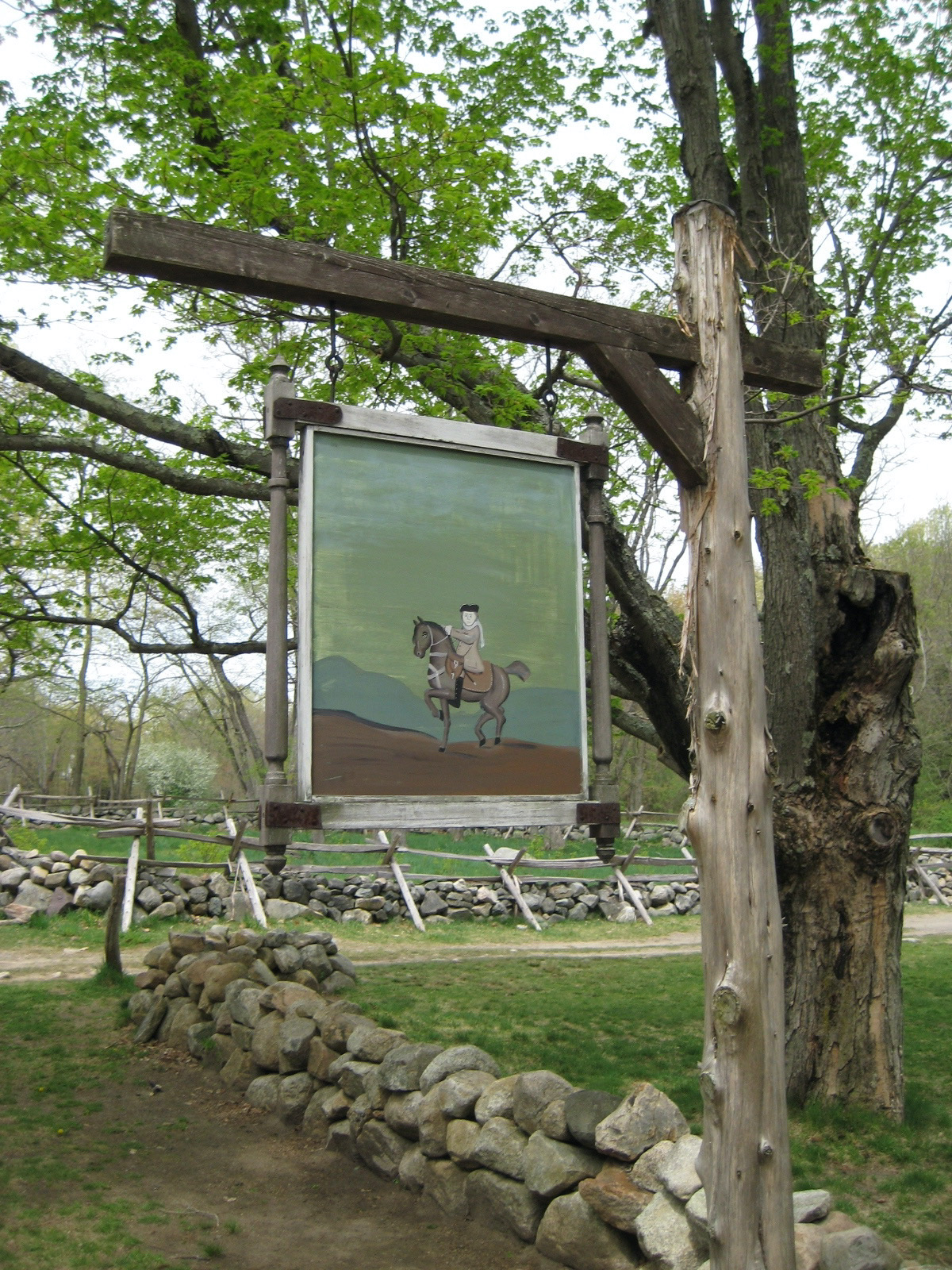
A replica of the original sign is used on the trail in front of the tavern
