= Virginia Road =

Historic road in Lincoln, Massachusetts

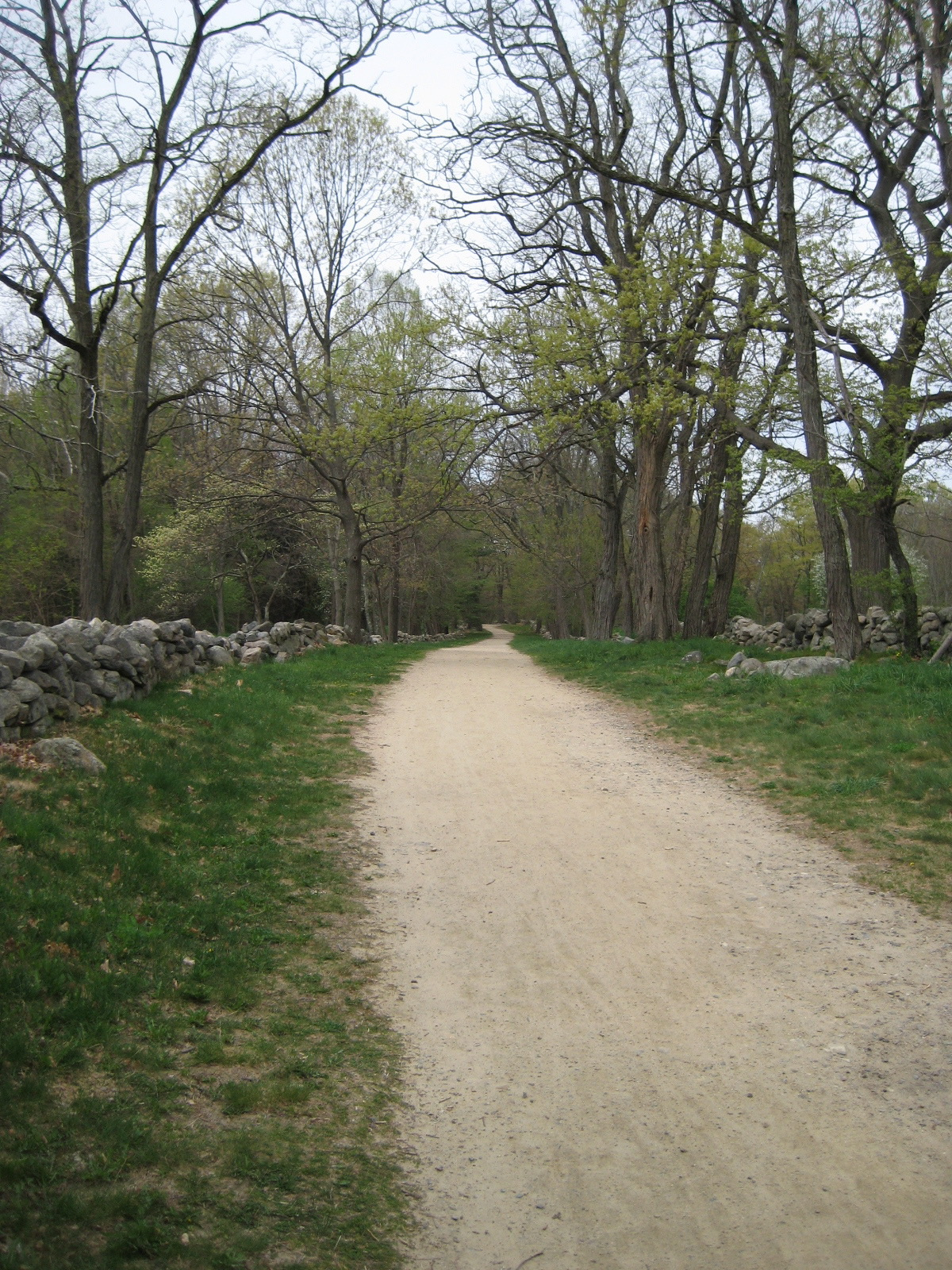
- The road in 2009, looking northwest from near Hartwell Tavern
- Interactive map of Virginia Road
- Location: Lincoln, Massachusetts, U.S.
- East end: Massachusetts Route 2A (North Great Road)
- West end: Old Bedford Road

Virginia Road, also known as North County Road, North Country Road and Bay Road, is a historic road in Lincoln, Massachusetts, United States. It was part of Concord until 1754. It is now in the care of the Minute Man National Historical Park.

The road runs from today's Massachusetts Route 2A (North Great Road) in the east to Old Bedford Road in the west, and is located on the northern side of Battle Road, of which, in colonial Massachusetts, it was a part. It was formerly the main road connecting Lexington and Concord, two of the main towns involved in the American Revolutionary War.

It is possible that the road originally began in Lincoln, to the south. Historian Coxey Toogood noted that the road between Lincoln and Bedford "passed close by the Hartwell house and tavern" and that it "passed through Hartwell's property, and close to his tavern." A Hartwell Road runs to the north of Hanscom Field, but its relevance to the developments of the late 18th century is not known.

Another historian, Joyce Malcolm, countered the theory put forth by Toogood, after consulting the deed of Hartwell Tavern:

There has been a suggestion that this road may have continued north between the farms of Samuel Hartwell and his father Ephraim to the old Bedford Road. There is no solid evidence for such a continuation and a survey of the Hartwell farms executed in 1779 shows no such road. While it might have been a useful addition to the Lincoln network of highways, there is no proof that it existed.

The route taken by "Virginia Road" on today's maps continues northwest for around 0.18 miles (0.29 km) from Hartwell Tavern to around 350 feet (110 m) southeast of the Bloody Angle, where British regulars were ambushed by the local militia on their retreat from Concord to Boston on April 19, 1775. At this point, the road turns due north, shortly before a short stretch of an "Old Bedford Road" joins from the east. (This is not the Old Bedford Road at which Virginia Road terminates in the west.)

The terrain in the area features gentle hills, with variations in elevation from 150 feet (46 m) to 230 feet (70 m) above mean sea level.

== Notable buildings and structures ==
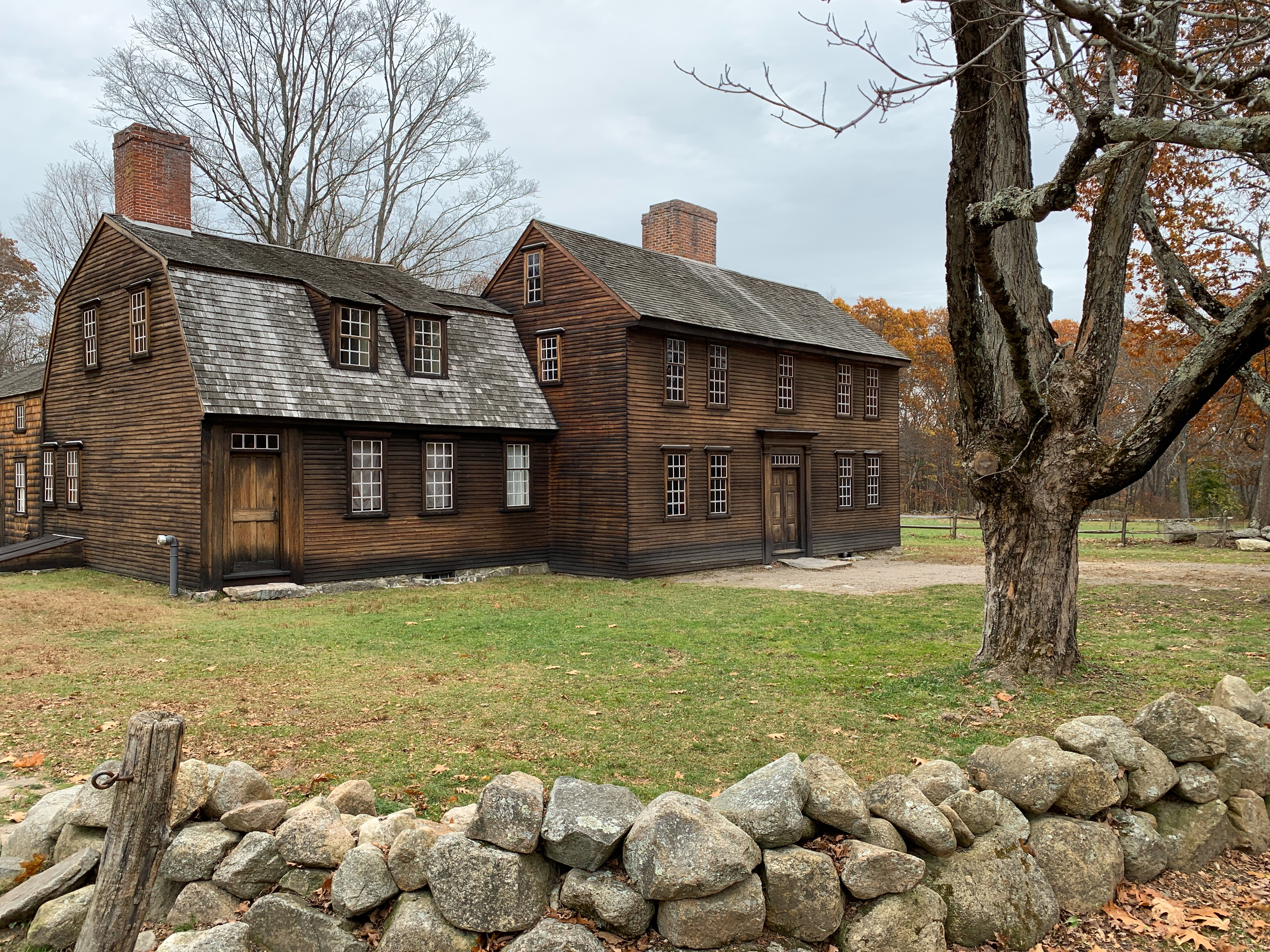
Hartwell Tavern, 2019

The below buildings stand beside the road (from east to west):

- Captain William Smith House (1692)
- Hartwell Tavern (1733)
- Samuel Hartwell House (1694; later Hartwell Farm restaurant; destroyed in 1973, only its central chimney and hearth remains)
