= Jim Hollister =

American historian

James Hollister is an American historian, National Park Service ranger and lead interpreter for the National Park Service (NPS). He has been a ranger at Minute Man National Historical Park since 2002. In 2022, he was awarded the Robert Gross Award by Concord Museum in recognition of his twenty years of service to the town's history and to the NPS.

In 2007, while he was an educational coordinator at Minute Man, he contributed to Honored Places, the National Park Service teacher's guide to the American Revolution.

== Personal life ==
In 2009, Hollister, who is from Littleton, Massachusetts, was in a relationship with fellow park ranger Emily Murphy.
