= Minute Man National Historical Park =

Historic park in Massachusetts, US

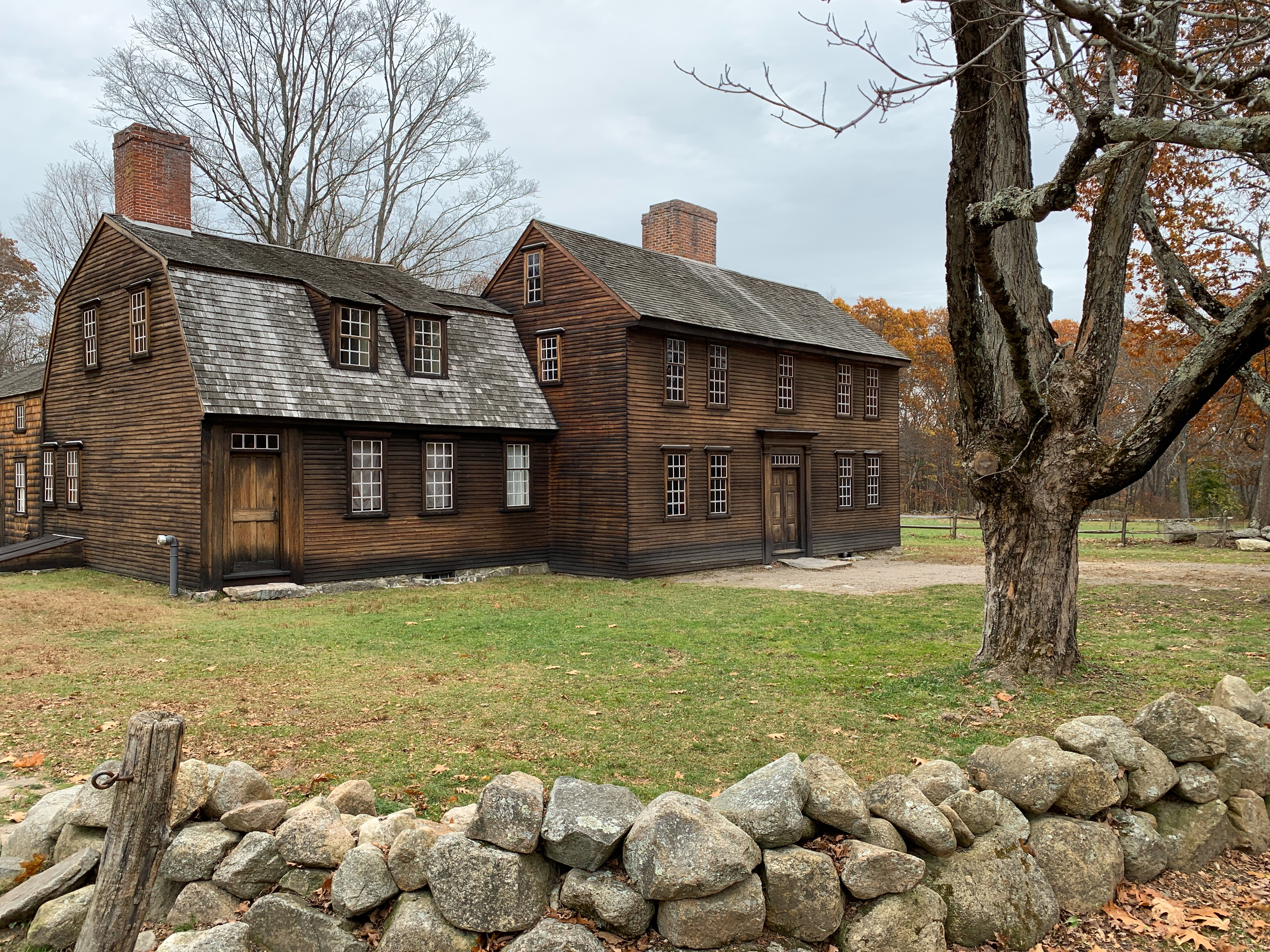
- Hartwell Tavern, Lincoln, Massachusetts (2019)

- Location within Massachusetts Location within the United States
- Location: Middlesex County, Massachusetts, US
- Nearest city: Lexington
- Coordinates: 42°27′11″N 71°17′55″W
- Area: 967 acres (391 ha)
- Established: September 21, 1959
- Visitors: 993,124 (in 2025)
- Governing body: National Park Service
- Website: Minute Man National Historical Park

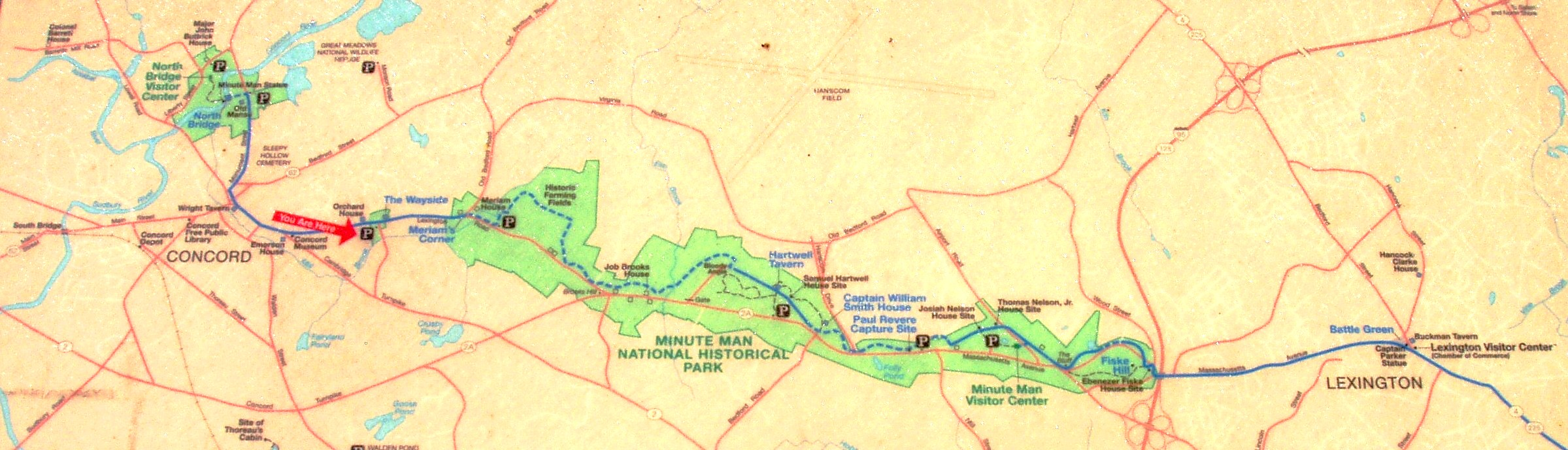
Map of the Minute Man National Historical Park.

Minute Man National Historical Park is a National Historical Park commemorating the opening battle in the American Revolutionary War, located in and around the Massachusetts towns of Lexington, Lincoln, and Concord. It includes the Old North Bridge, where the Battle of Concord began on April 19, 1775, and the Wayside, home in turn to three noted American authors. Operated under the jurisdiction of the National Park Service, the park protects 970 acres (392.5 ha).

Between 2022 and 2025, the park received approximately $27 million in funding from the Great American Outdoors Act to assist with its maintenance.

== Sites ==
- Concord's Old North Bridge, where the Battle of Concord began on April 19, 1775. This was the second battle of the day, after the brief fight at dawn on Lexington Common. Ralph Waldo Emerson immortalized the North Bridge Fight as "the shot heard round the world" in his 1837 poem "Concord Hymn".

At this site also stands Daniel Chester French's well-known The Minute Man statue of 1874. The Obelisk Monument stands across the North Bridge, opposite The Minute Man statue. Close by is the grave of the two regular army soldiers killed at the bridge and the Old Manse.

- The five-mile (8 km) "Battle Road Trail" between Lexington and Concord includes a restored colonial landscape approximating the path of the running skirmishes between British regulars and American militia. It includes a monument at the site where Paul Revere was captured during his midnight ride, the Captain William Smith House, and the Hartwell Tavern, a restored 18th-century inn and house on the Battle Road where living history programs are presented from May through October. The Battle Road Trail winds through fields and forests and is accessible from several different parking areas.
- The Wayside, a National Historic Landmark, was home to Concord muster-master Samuel Whitney on April 19, 1775. In later years it became home to authors Amos Bronson Alcott and his daughter Louisa May Alcott, Nathaniel Hawthorne, and Margaret Sidney. The Alcotts called the home "Hillside"; Hawthorne renamed it "Wayside". The house is also part of the National Underground Railroad Network to Freedom.
- Barrett's Farm was the home of Colonel James Barrett, about 1.5 miles west of North Bridge on Barrett's Farm Road; it is the newest addition to Minute Man National Historical Park. It was the destination of British regulars who crossed North Bridge intent on searching the farm for artillery and ammunition that they thought was hidden there. The house and 3.4 acres of land were purchased and restored by Save Our Heritage, a Concord non-profit organization which transferred ownership to the National Park Service in 2012.
- Lexington Battle Green, formerly known as Lexington Common, is the site of the first action on April 19, 1775. The Town of Lexington owns and maintains it. The Green is also where the Captain Parker Statue by Henry Hudson Kitson is located.

Park visitor centers are located at the hill overlooking the North Bridge and along Battle Road. The main visitor center on Route 2A/Battle Road features the 25-minute multi-media show "Road to Revolution", which gives a good introduction to the Lexington-Concord events. An eight-minute film at the North Bridge Visitor Center provides a comprehensive account of events leading to the encounter at North Bridge. The park's lead interpreter is Jim Hollister, who joined its ranks in 2002.

== Gallery ==
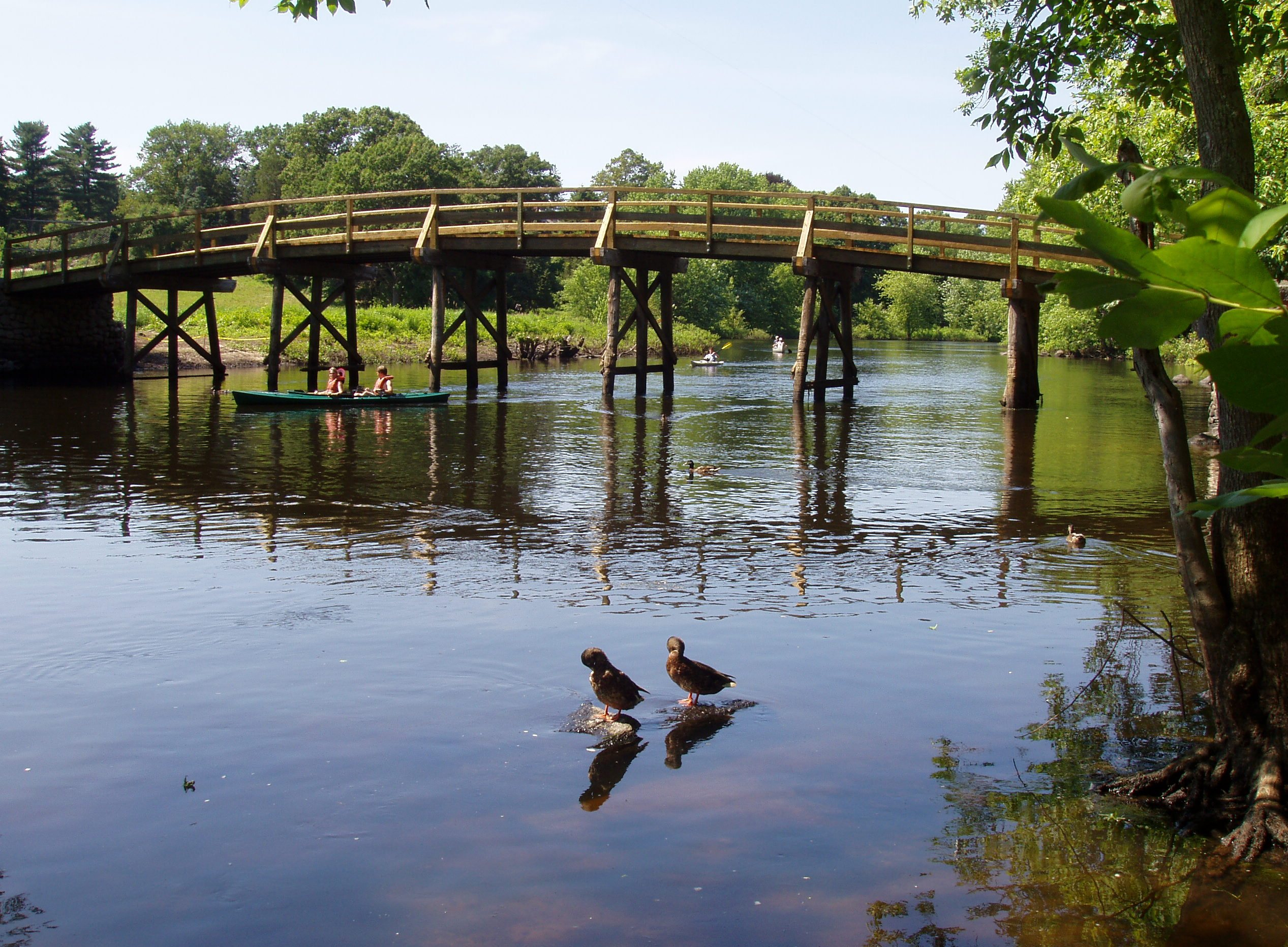
Old North Bridge, Concord

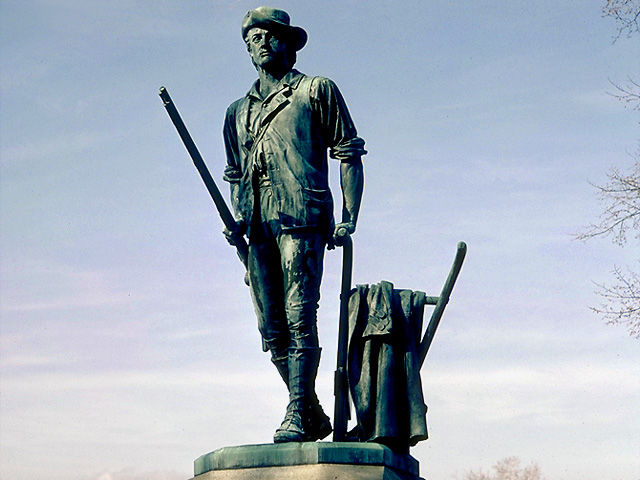
The Minute Man statue adjacent to the North Bridge, by Daniel Chester French, 1874

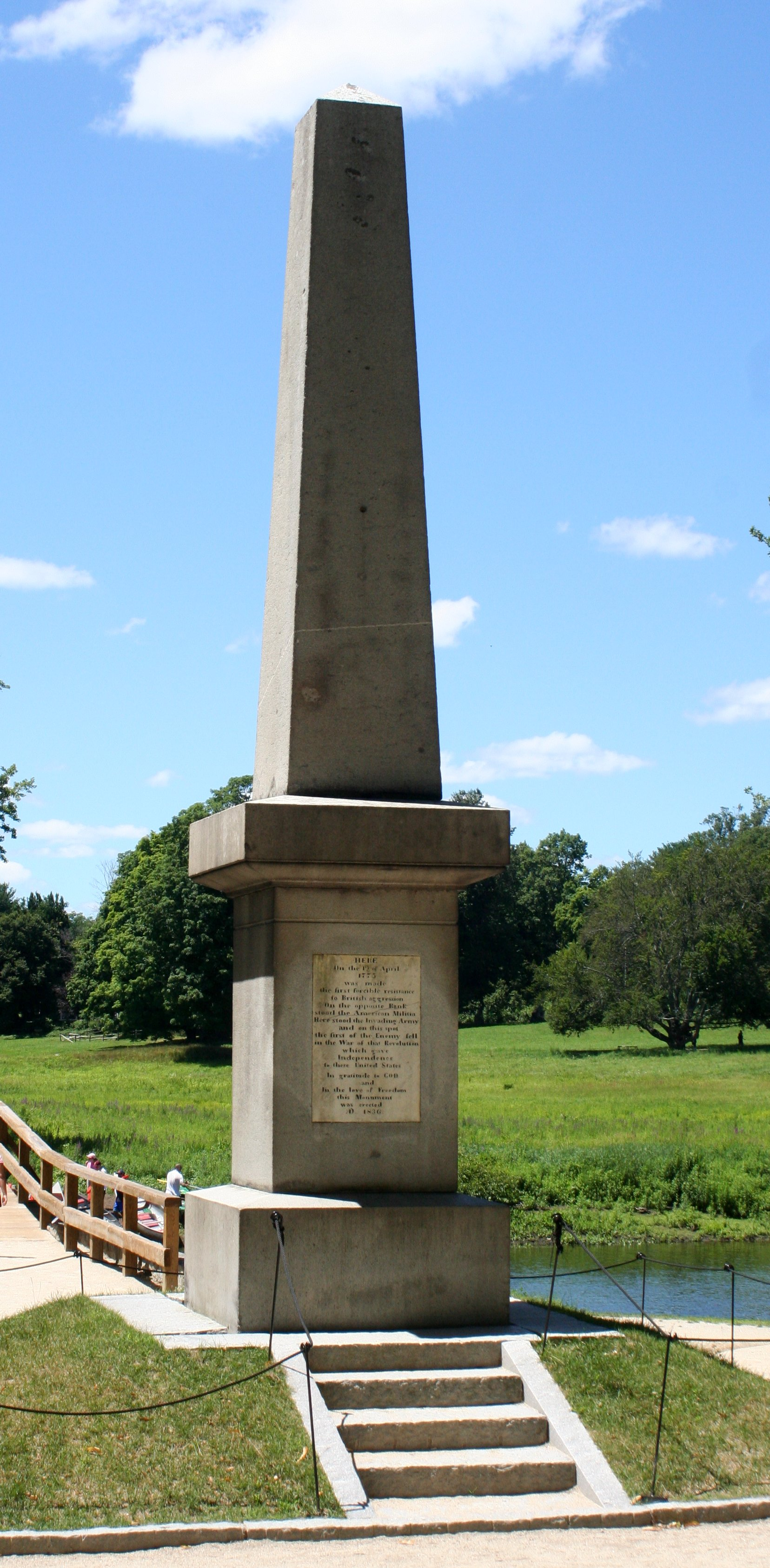
Memorial obelisk adjacent to the North Bridge

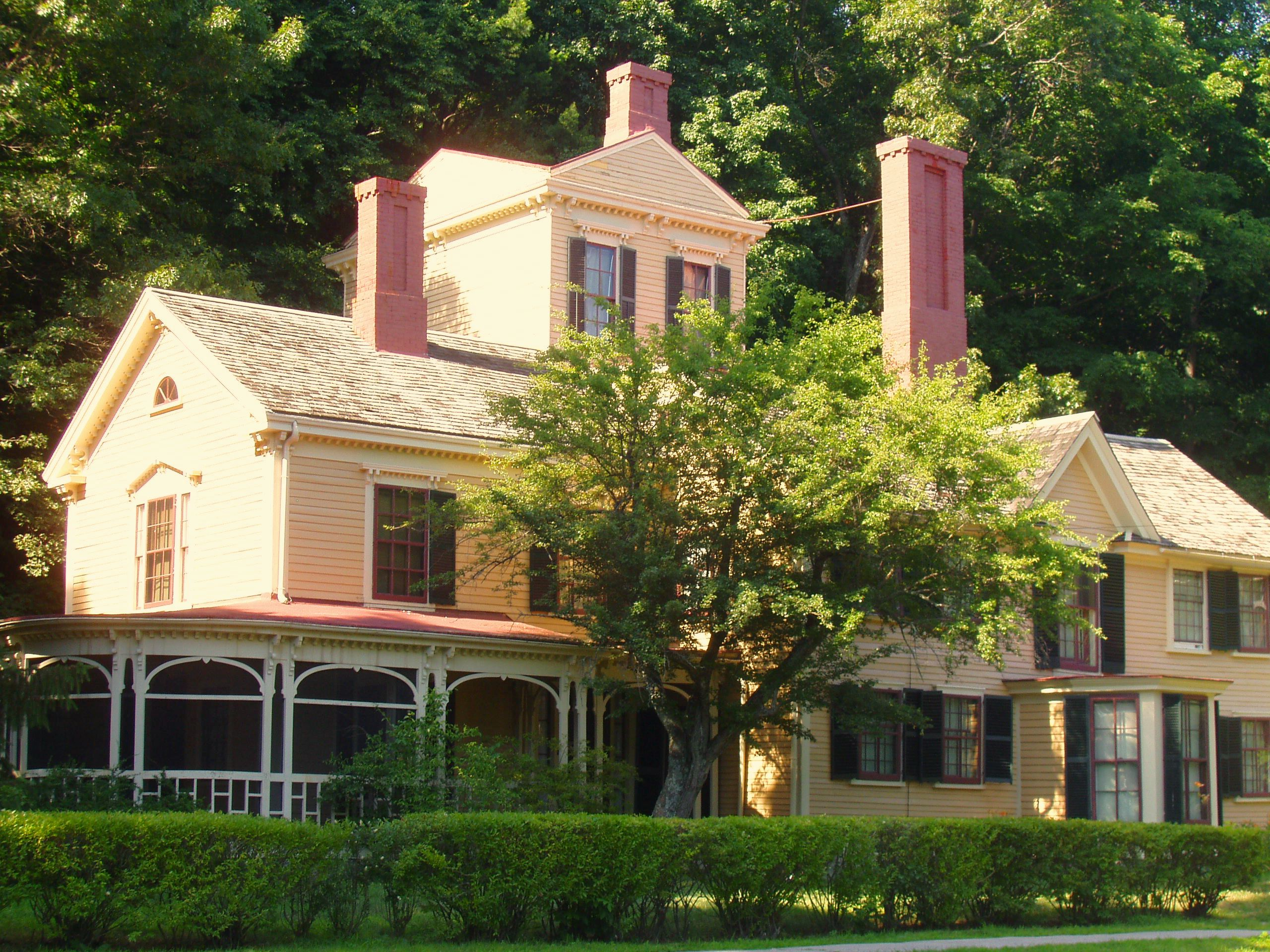
The Wayside, home in turn to authors Louisa May Alcott, Nathaniel Hawthorne and Margaret Sidney

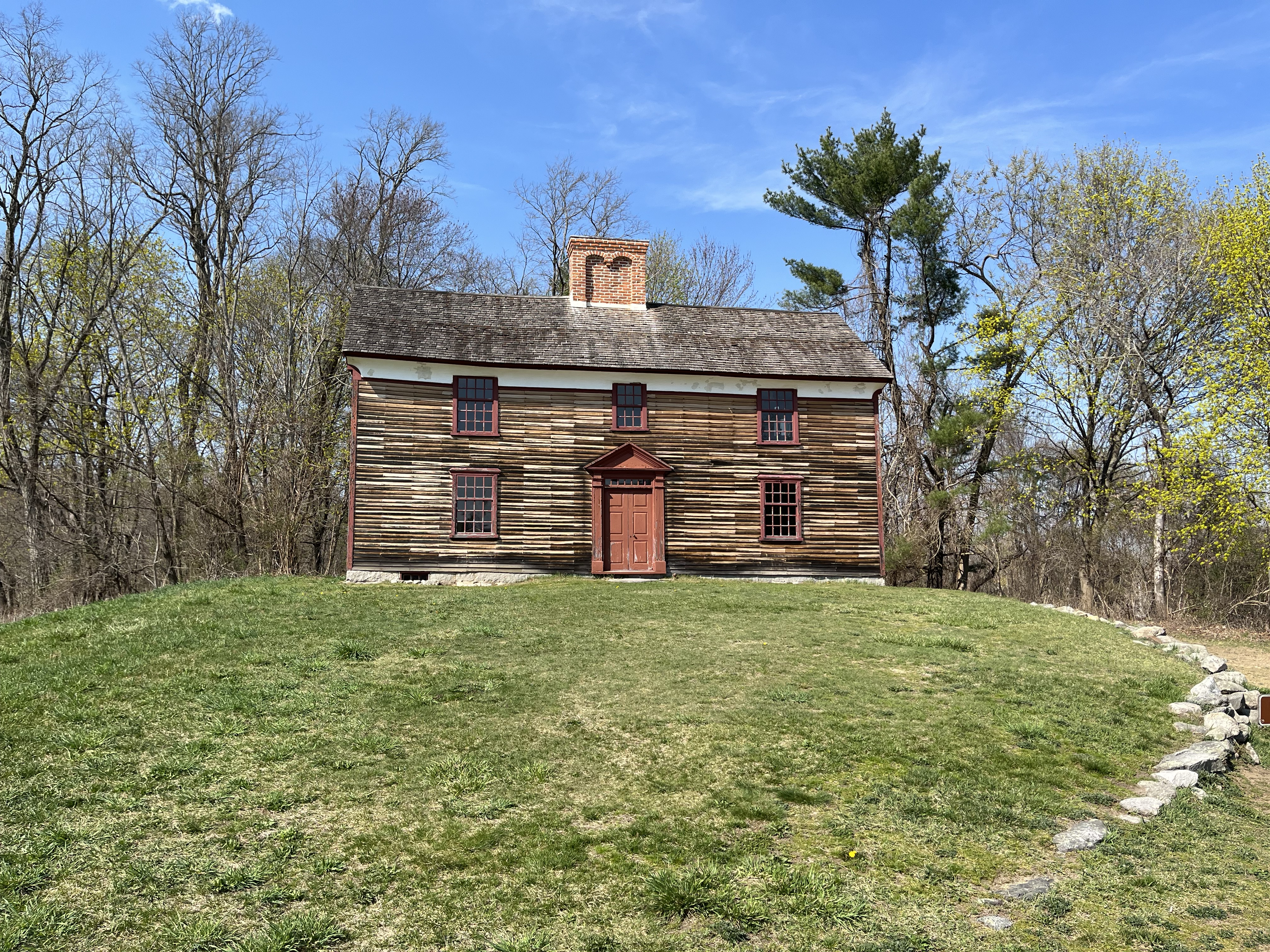
Captain William Smith House, Lincoln

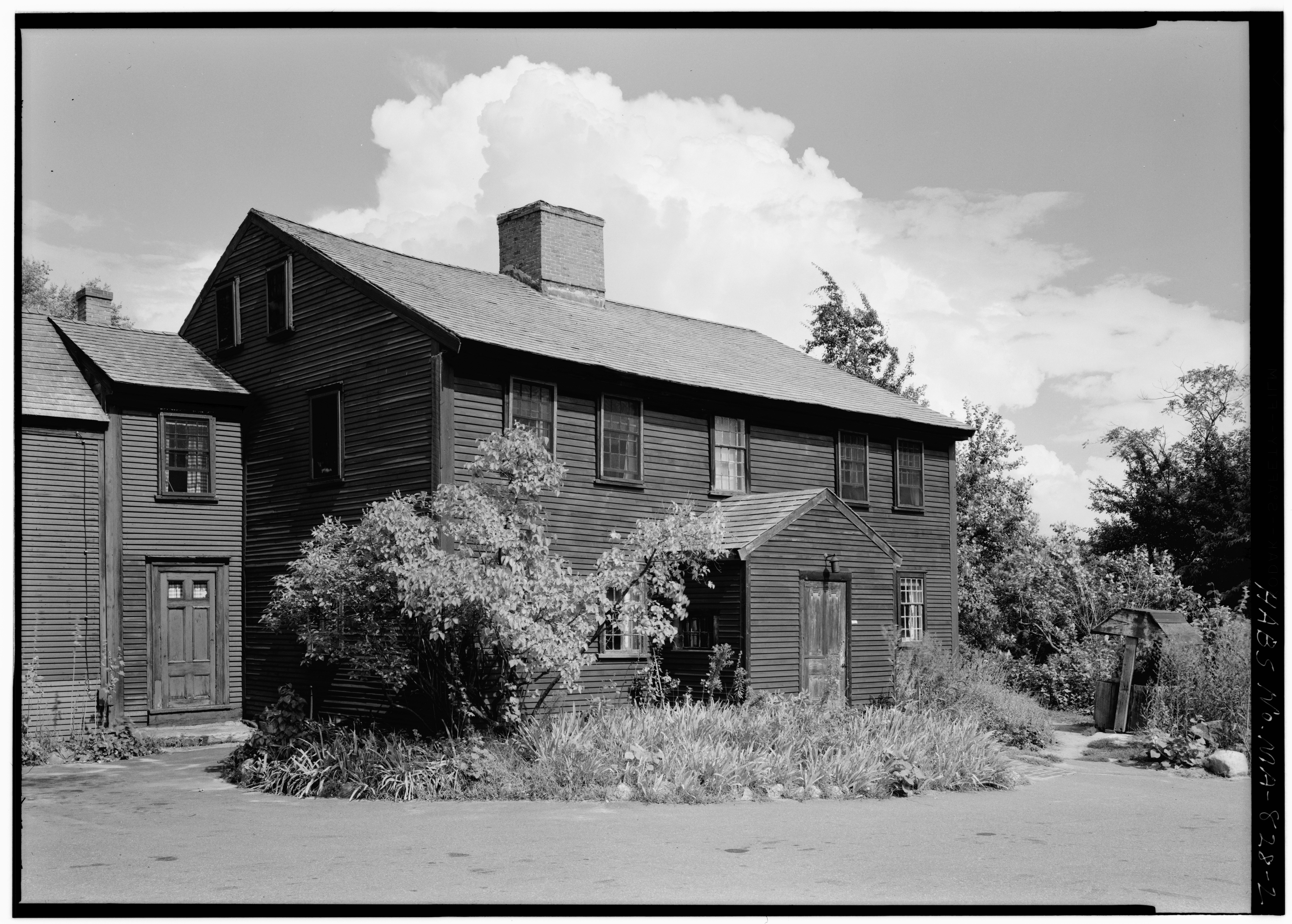
Samuel Hartwell House, Lincoln, prior to its destruction by fire in the 1970s

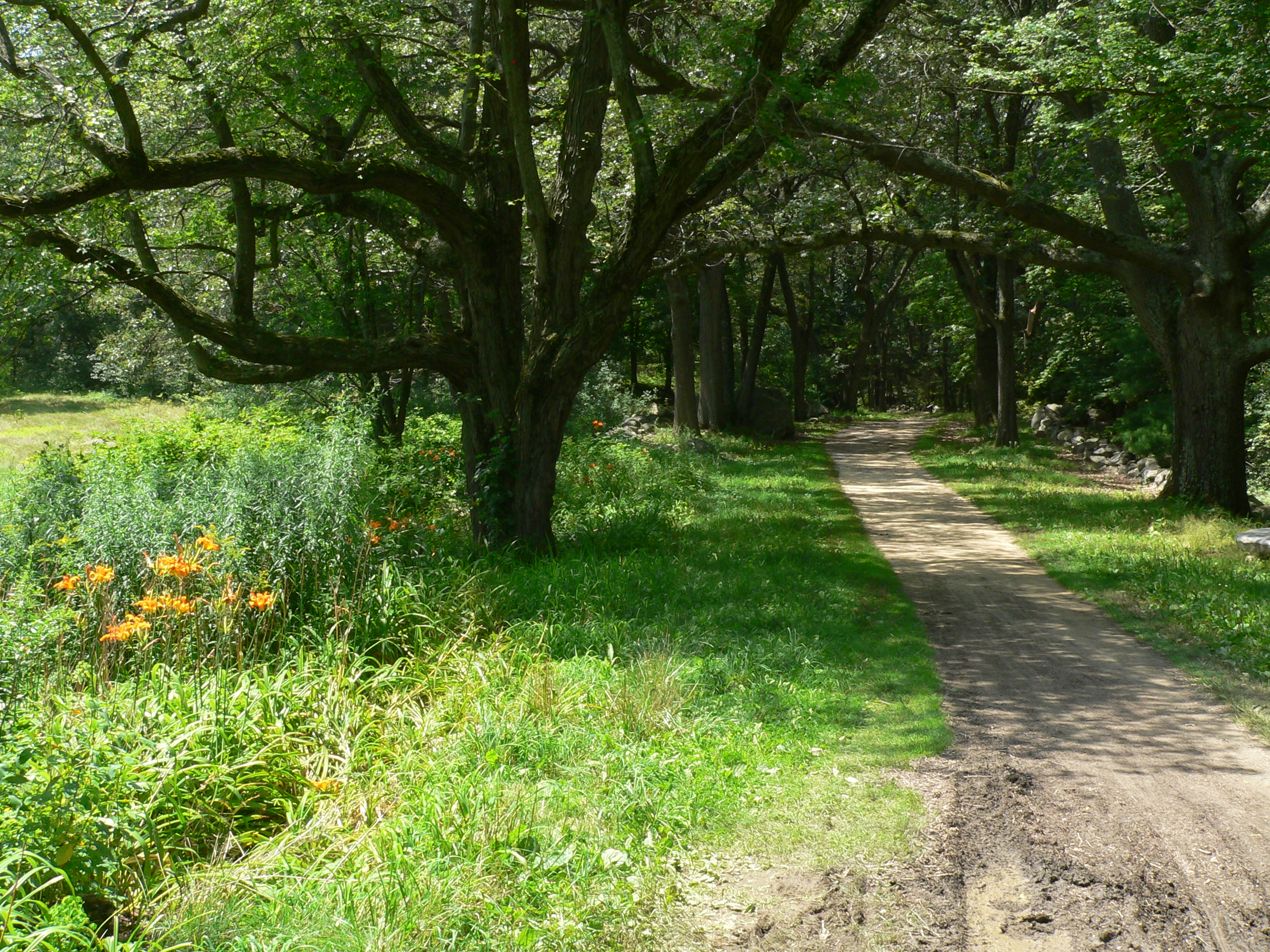
Battle Road

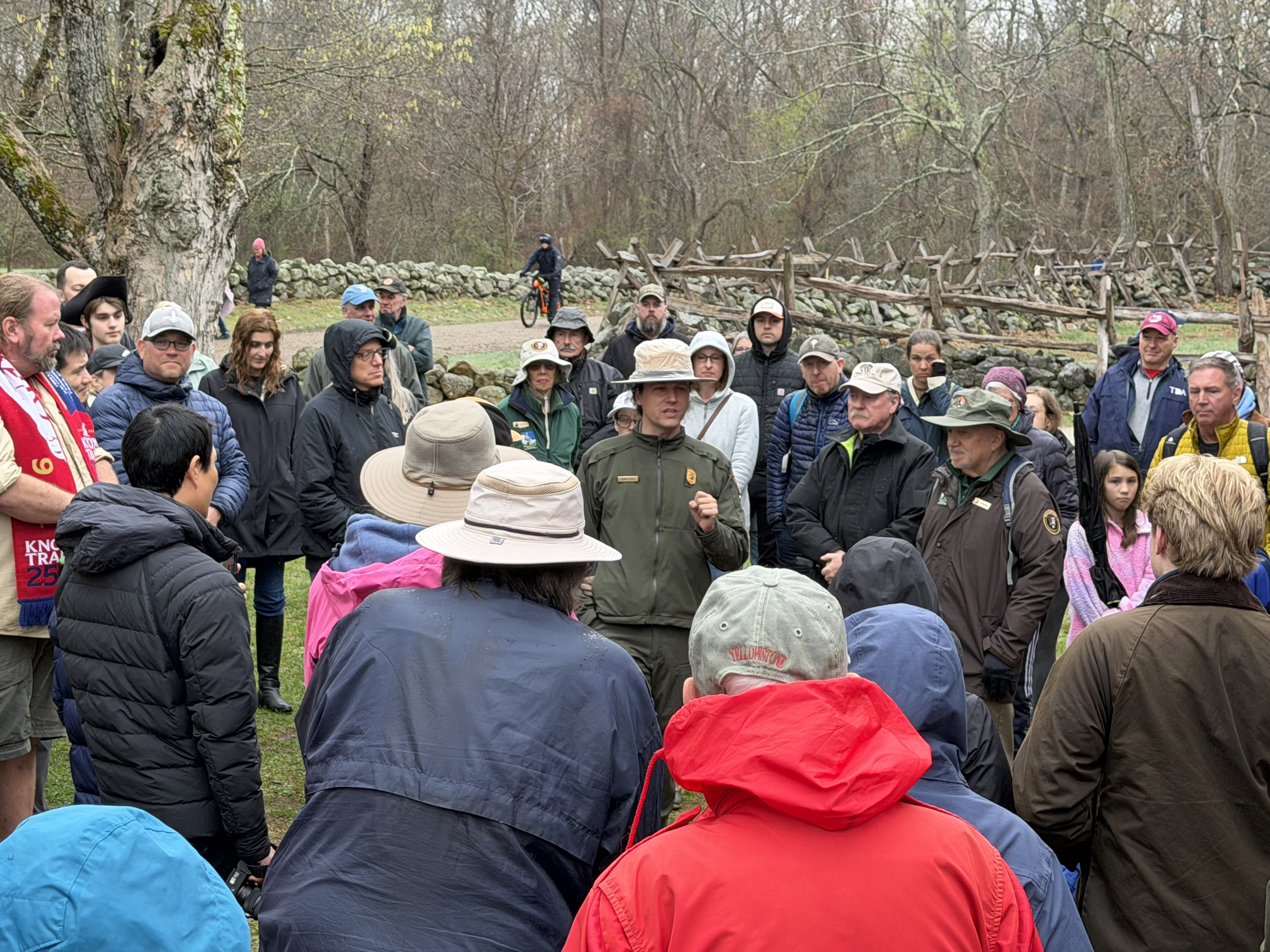
A National Park Service ranger giving a talk outside the Hartwell Tavern

== See also ==
- National Register of Historic Places listings in Concord, Massachusetts
- National Register of Historic Places listings in Middlesex County, Massachusetts
