= Old North Bridge =

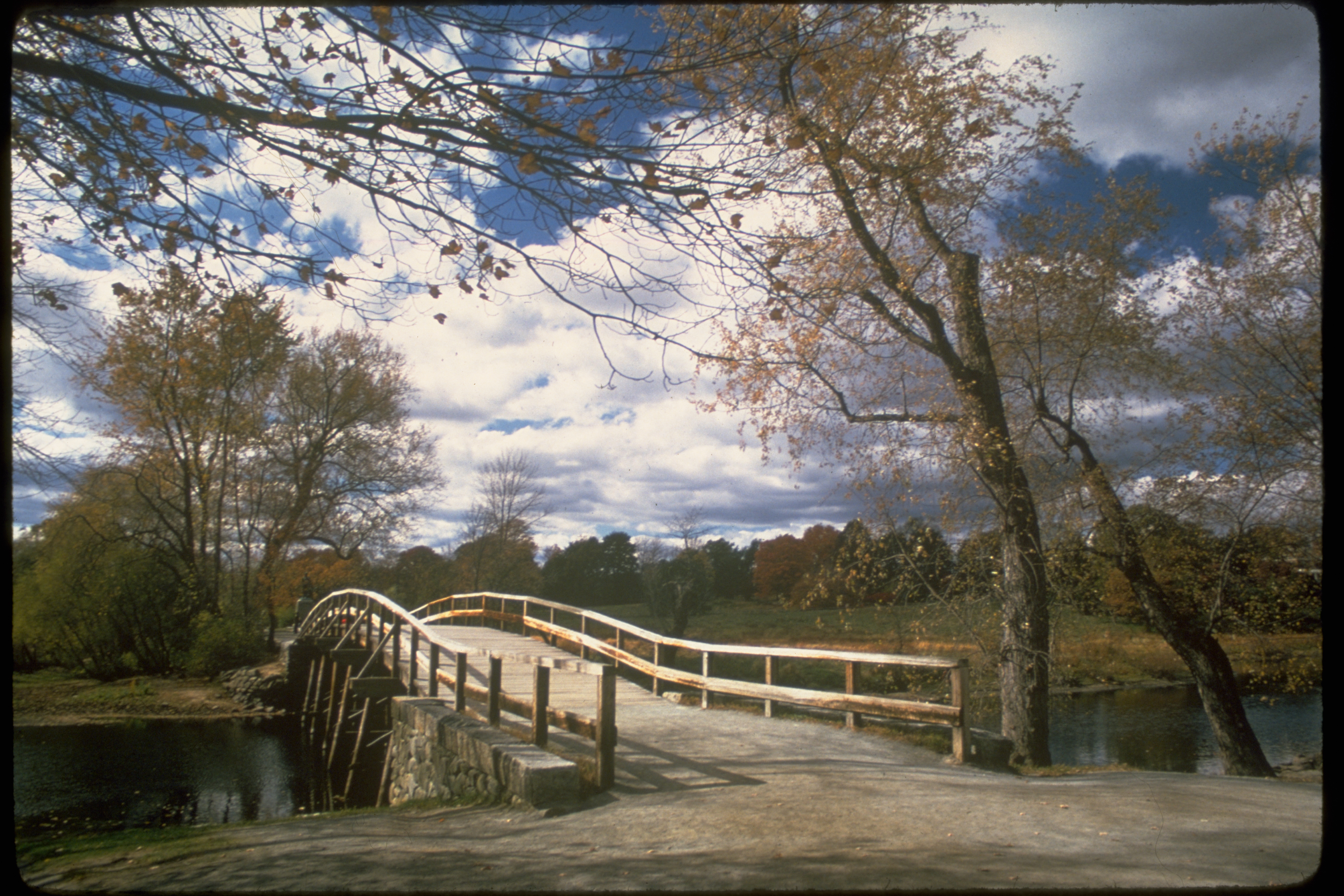
- The extant 1956 bridge, an approximate replica of the 1760 bridge present during the Battles of Lexington and Concord
- Coordinates: 42°28′08″N 71°21′04″W
- Crosses: Concord River
- Locale: Concord, Massachusetts, U.S.

Characteristics
- Material: Wood

History
- Rebuilt: Existing version 2005
- Closed: 1793

Location
- Interactive map of Old North Bridge

The North Bridge, often colloquially called the Old North Bridge, is a historic site in Concord, Massachusetts, spanning the Concord River. On April 19, 1775, the first day of the American Revolutionary War, provincial minutemen and militia companies numbering approximately 400 engaged roughly 90 British Army troops at this location. The battle was the first instance in which American forces advanced in formation on the British regulars, inflicted casualties, and routed their opponents. It was a pivotal moment in the Battles of Lexington and Concord and in American history. The significance of the historic events at the North Bridge inspired Ralph Waldo Emerson to refer to the moment as the "shot heard round the world".

There were at least eight iterations of the North Bridge constructed over four centuries. The current wooden pedestrian bridge, an approximate replica of the bridge that stood at the time of the battle, was built in 1956 and extensively restored in 2005. The bridge and the surrounding 114 acres of land make up what is known as the North Bridge unit of Minute Man National Historical Park, which is managed by the National Park Service. It is a popular tourist destination.

== Origin and earliest iterations ==
The Town of Concord was settled in 1635. Over the next two decades, colonial settlers established farms in the north quarter of the town. Many of these farms lay on the opposite side of the Concord River from the town center. To facilitate travel from their farms to the town, north quarter land owners built a bridge over the Concord River at or near this location by the early 1650s. The first mention of a bridge at this location appears in town records in 1654. The farm road crossing the bridge was later improved and came to be known as the Groton Road.

Spring flooding of the river and deterioration required the replacement of the bridge approximately every 20 to 30 years. Colonial records suggest that the bridge was likely replaced in 1660, again around 1683, again around 1710, and again in 1731. In 1760, the town constructed a new bridge at this site. This version was the one that was present during the Concord Fight on April 19, 1775.

== "Concord Fight" ==
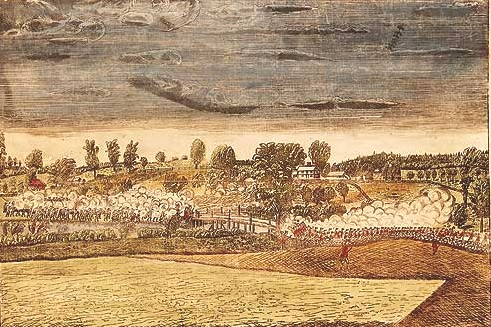
A 1775 drawing by Amos Doolittle of the engagement at the North Bridge based on witness accounts and his own inspection of the bridge

The engagement which took place at the North Bridge is known as the "Concord Fight" and was a part of the larger Battles of Lexington and Concord. On April 18, 1775, General Thomas Gage, the military Governor of Massachusetts, dispatched a force of roughly 700 British soldiers from Boston to confiscate or destroy military supplies being stockpiled in Concord by the Massachusetts Provincial Congress. On their way to Concord, this force encountered a small group of militia on Lexington Green, where they opened fire on the Americans. The British soldiers then marched on to Concord, where Lieutenant Colonel Francis Smith sent six companies across the North Bridge to search provincial Colonel James Barrett's farm for munitions. Three of these companies went on to Barrett's farm, while three held the North Bridge. These were the British light infantry companies from the 4th, 10th, and 43rd Regiments of Foot under Captain Walter Laurie. These companies initially held positions on the western side of the bridge, but they crossed the bridge when the Americans advanced and took up a position on the eastern bank.

At about 9:30, the Americans noticed smoke rising in the direction of the village of Concord on the other side of the bridge. British regulars burned some wooden gun carriages that they discovered there, but the American militia beyond the bridge believed that the regulars had set fire to the town. The Americans advanced in military order to take the bridge and moved on with the intention of stopping the British from burning the town. As they advanced, the British fired a few warning shots followed by a full volley. Several Americans were killed or wounded in this first round of firing, and Major John Buttrick of Concord commanded, "Fire, fellow soldiers, for God's sake fire!" The Americans returned fire, causing the British to immediately retreat back to Concord. Three British soldiers were killed and nine wounded. On the American side, two were killed and four wounded.

This first instance of Americans fighting in military order and firing to deadly effect on British troops was a key turning point in the Battles of Lexington and Concord. It precipitated the British retreat back to Boston and is regarded as one of the most significant events in American history.

== Later iterations of the bridge ==
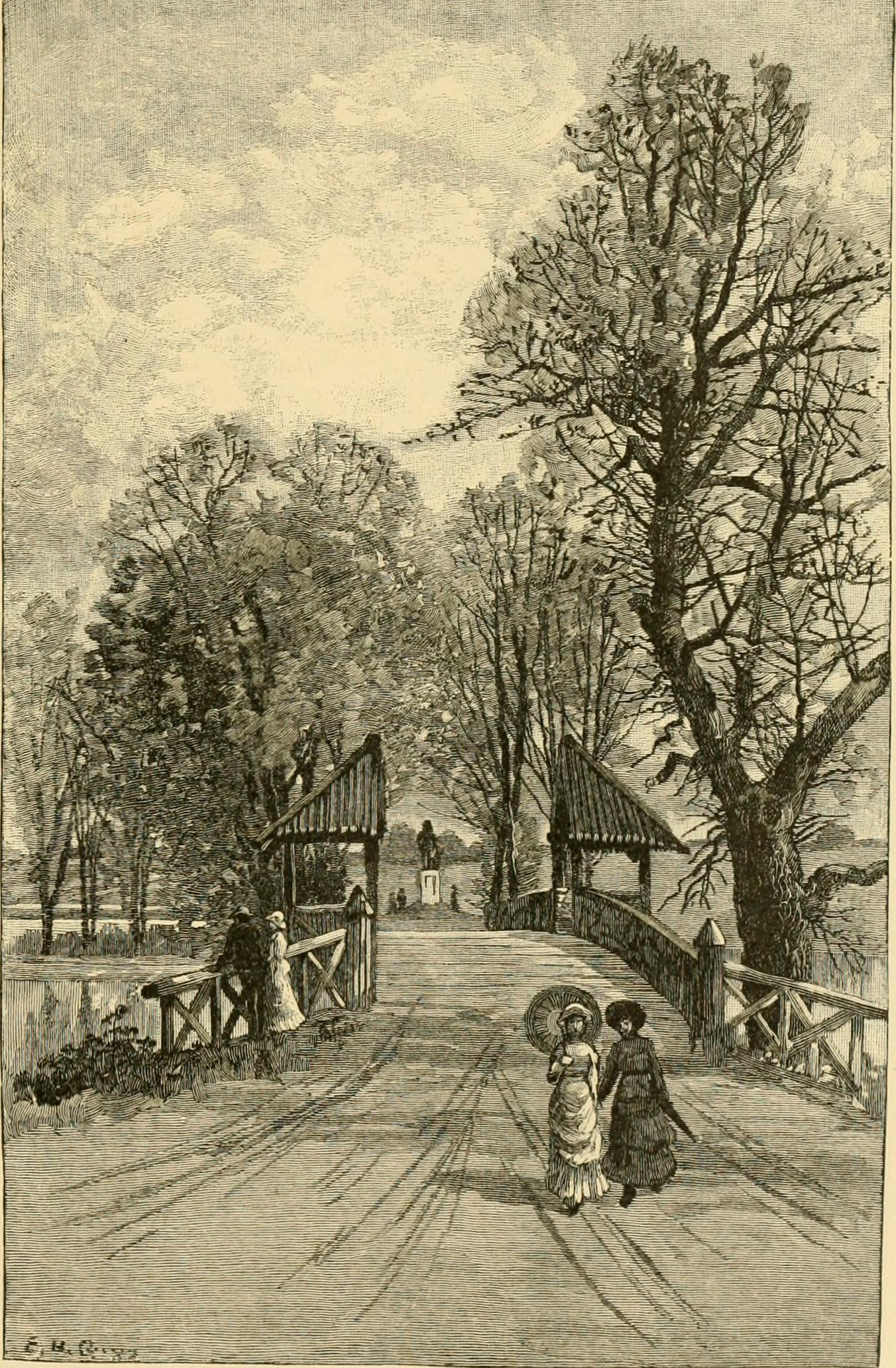
An 1882 drawing of the Centennial Bridge with covered pavilions

In 1788, a new bridge was constructed to replace the 1760 structure which had been in place during the battle. As with prior iterations, those with farms adjacent to the bridge paid for the replacement. In 1788 these included Captain David Brown, Lieutenant Elisha Jones, and Colonel John Buttrick, all of whom had fought at the North Bridge in 1775. In 1793, Concord constructed a new bridge several hundred yards downriver of the North Bridge, making the latter obsolete. The road was diverted to the new bridge and the old road over the North Bridge was abandoned by the town. That same year, the town authorized Elisha Jones to tear down the North Bridge. For the next 82 years, no bridge stood at the site.

In 1874, as plans developed for the celebration of the centennial of the battle, the Town of Concord appointed a committee to oversee the placement of a monument on the west side of the river where the first minutemen died in combat. They were also charged with rebuilding the North Bridge. The new structure would be open to foot traffic only and would serve as part of the larger memorial, providing access to the new statue and demonstrating to visitors what the area looked like on the first day of the Revolution. The centennial version of the North Bridge, constructed in 1874, has been described as "whimsical" and overly rustic, representing a Victorian era interpretation of what a colonial bridge looked like. The architect was William Ralph Emerson, cousin to Ralph Waldo Emerson, Concord's famed writer and transcendentalist. The most unusual features of the Centennial Bridge were its two pavilions or covered arbors protruding from either side of the center of the bridge covered with interwoven twigs, reminiscent of a Polynesian style.

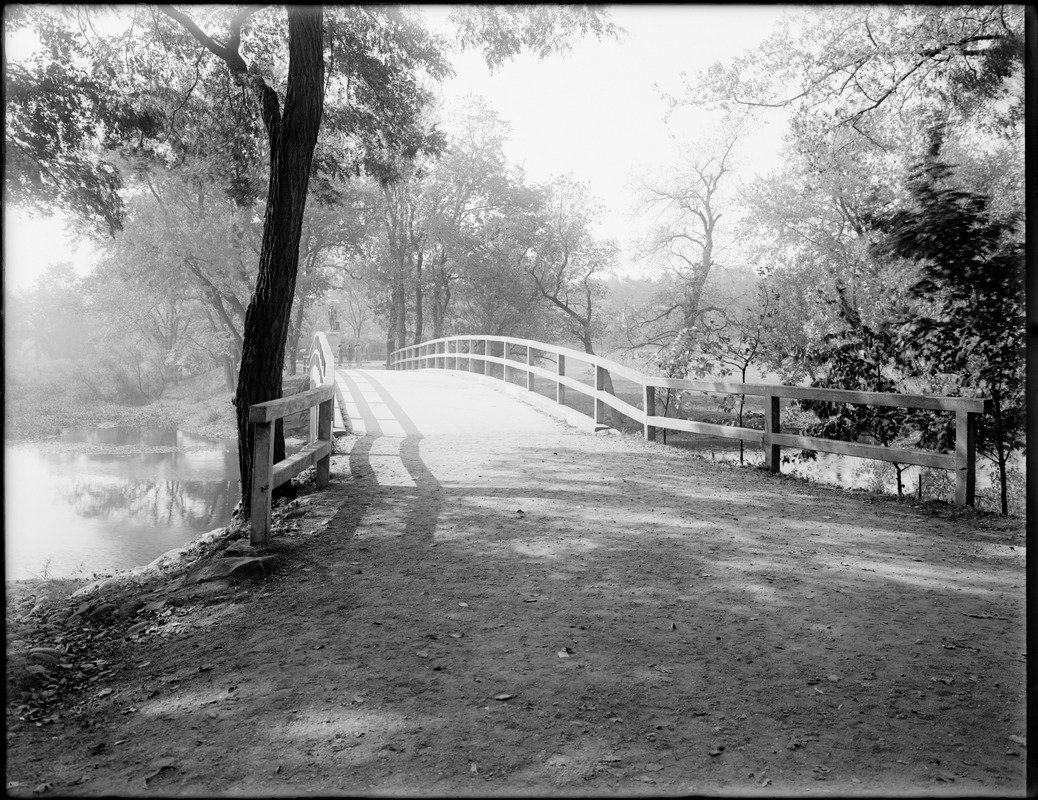
Old North Bridge, Concord, Mass., October 13, 1930; from the Leon Abdalian Collection of the Boston Public Library

The Centennial Bridge was washed away during the spring freshet of 1888. It was replaced by a more austere bridge that same year. William R. Emerson also designed this bridge but left out the unusual decorative flourishes of his Centennial Bridge. Despite attempts to make the 1888 bridge stronger with large oak pilings and cross beams, it too was washed out by spring floods in 1909. The bridge was replaced by the Commonwealth of Massachusetts in 1909. The architect was Joseph R. Worcester. The bridge had the appearance of historical accuracy in that it closely resembled the bridge as depicted by Doolittle, however many disliked it due to the fact that it was made of concrete.

== Existing bridge ==
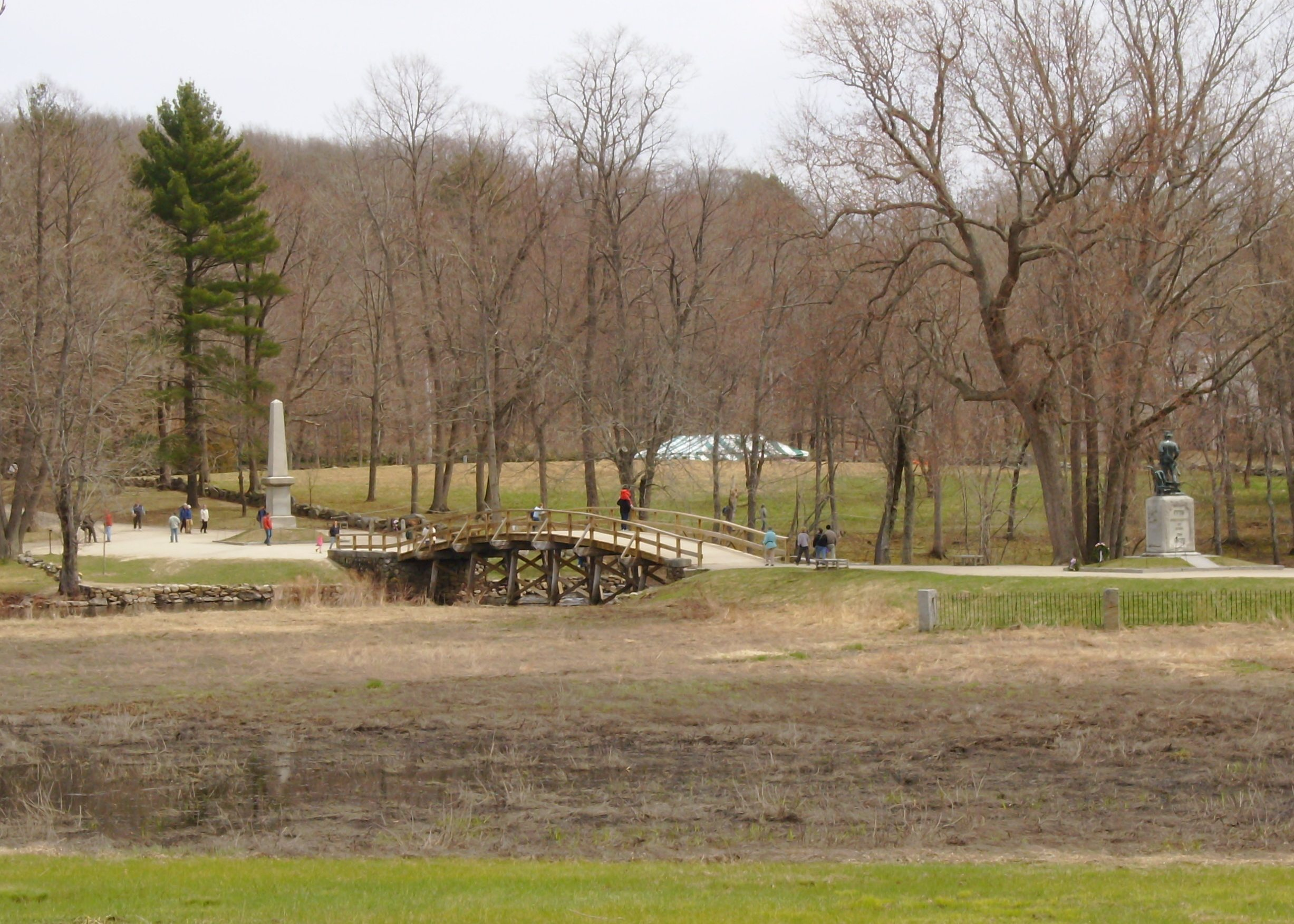
From left to right: the 1836 Battle Monument, the 1956 Old North Bridge (restored in 2005), and "The Minute Man" statue by Daniel Chester French

In 1955, the 1909 concrete bridge was damaged beyond repair by flooding due to Hurricane Diane. This took place as the town was considering numerous landscape architectural plans to better preserve the monuments at the site and the surrounding grounds. Concord residents mounted protests, urging that the new commemorative bridge should be made of wood and not concrete. Massachusetts politicians including Massachusetts Commissioner of Public Works and future Governor John Volpe and the current Governor Christian Herter pressed for funding from Congress but this failed to pass. In 1956 the Commonwealth of Massachusetts undertook construction of a new bridge.

The state engaged the architectural firm of Whitman and Howard to design the new bridge. Working for that firm, architect Howard Perkins was responsible for drafting the plans. Perkins closely examined the Doolittle drawing and came up with an interpretation based on the 1760 bridge. His design featured, according to architectural conservator Judith Q. Sullivan, "an arched pile bent bridge consisting of six bents of three piles each." Perkins omitted some features evident in the Doolittle design and incorporated others not present for the sake of stability. The most prominent of these added features are the pile header beams which extend on either side of the bridge platform and the cross braces connected to them. These provide strength but also allow flexibility during floods The 1956 bridge used pressure treated wood but incorporated hand hewn timbers for an authentic appearance. The bridge is 109 feet and 8 inches long between abutments. Construction was completed in September 1956 and dedicated on September 29, 1956 by Governor Herter.

In 1959, the bridge and surrounding land became part of the Minute Man National Historical Park. When the park was added to the National Register of Historic Places in 1966, the bridge was listed as "a contributing structure which illustrates the continuing commemorative importance of the place." In 2002, an engineering conditions assessment of the bridge was conducted and found significant deterioration. After further preservation studies, Minute Man National Historical Park embarked on an extensive restoration of the bridge in 2005.

== Monuments placed at the site ==
=== 1836 Battle Monument ===
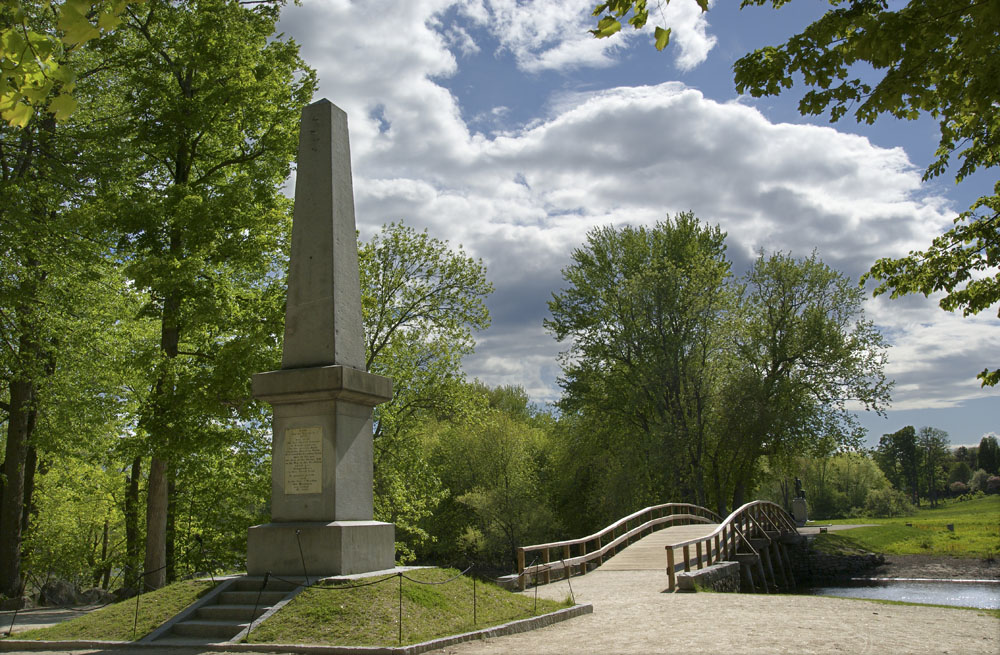
The 1836 Battle Monument and Old North Bridge

In 1835, when there was no bridge at the site, Rev. Ezra Ripley, who resided nearby at the Old Manse, donated a narrow parcel of land to the town. This parcel would allow public access from Monument Street to the proposed site of a monument on the east bank where the Old North Bridge had stood. The parcel included a section of the old Groton Road which once led to the bridge as well as the grave sites of two British soldiers who were killed in the fight and buried nearby the bridge. The town of Concord erected the 1836 Battle Monument (as it is now known) with funds donated by the Bunker Hill Monument Association. The obelisk was designed by Solomon Willard and placed on the land donated by Ripley, near where the east abutment of the bridge had been. The inscription on the monument reads, "HERE On the 19 of April, 1775, was made the first forcible resistance to British aggression / On the opposite Bank stood the American Militia / Here stood the Invading Army and on this spot the first of the Enemy fell in the War of that Revolution which gave Independence to these United States / In gratitude to GOD and In the love of Freedom this Monument was erected AD. 1836."

Concord dedicated the monument on Independence Day, July 4, 1837. Congressman Samuel Hoar gave the dedication address. For the occasion, Ralph Waldo Emerson wrote his "Concord Hymn" which was sung by a chorus at the dedication. The first, and best known, of the four stanzas of this poem is:

By the rude bridge that arched the flood,
Their flag to April's breeze unfurled,
Here once the embattled farmers stood
And fired the shot heard round the world.

This stanza was later etched into the pedestal of the 1875 "Minute Man" statue.

=== "The Minute Man" statue ===
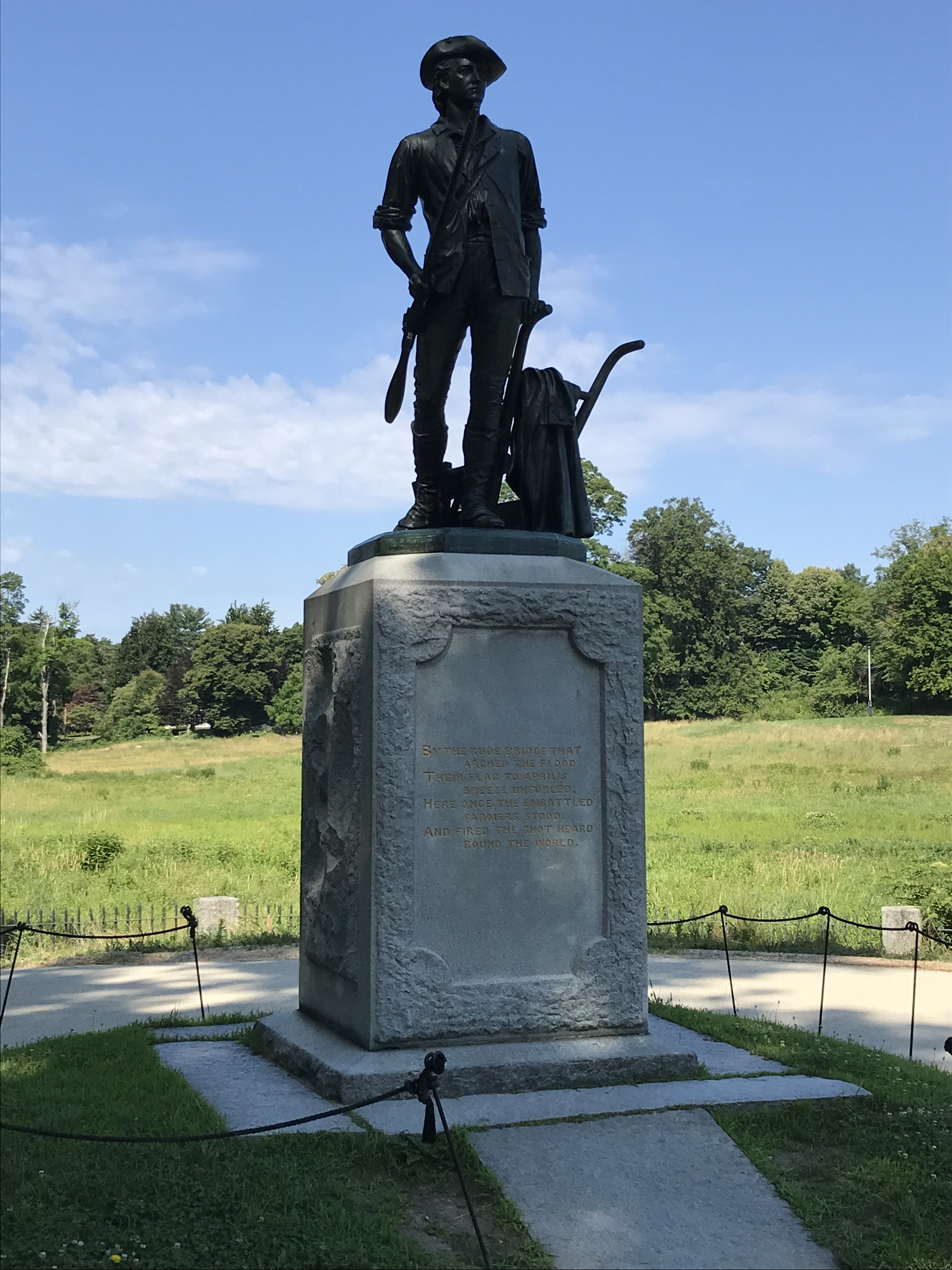
"The Minute Man" statue, erected in 1875

The location of the 1836 Battle Monument did not sit well with some in Concord. Because there was no longer a bridge, the obelisk had been placed on the eastern bank where the British had stood during the Concord Fight. A Concord farmer named Ebenezer Hubbard was particularly annoyed that the spot where the first Americans had lost their lives during the Concord Fight remained unmarked. Upon his death in 1870, he left the Town of Concord $1,000 to place a monument on the west side of the Concord River and to reconstruct the Old North Bridge to provide access to it. The residents of Concord pressed to finish both the new bridge and monument in time for the centennial celebration in 1875.

Daniel Chester French, then 21 years old, was engaged by the Monument Committee to sculpt a statue representing a minuteman. Although commissioned to sculpt a generic provincial soldier, French was inspired by the story of Capt. Isaac Davis of Acton, Massachusetts. Davis commanded the company which led the advance on the Old North Bridge. He was among the first killed and the first American officer killed in action during the Revolution. French attempted to model the facial features of his statue after photographs of Isaac Davis's descendants.

"The Minute Man" was unveiled and dedicated during the celebrations for the centennial of the Concord Fight on April 19, 1875. President Ulysses S. Grant attended the ceremony along with the Vice President, Secretary of War, and Secretary of State. The statue was cast from melted down Civil War cannons at the Ames Foundry. "The Minute Man" has been used as the symbol of the United States National Guard and on coins such as the Massachusetts state quarter.

On April 19, 1975, the 200th anniversary of the Concord Fight, President Gerald Ford gave a speech at the bridge and placed a wreath at the base of "The Minute Man" as part of the United States Bicentennial celebrations. A crowd of over 15,000 people attended the exercises.

=== Graves of British soldiers ===
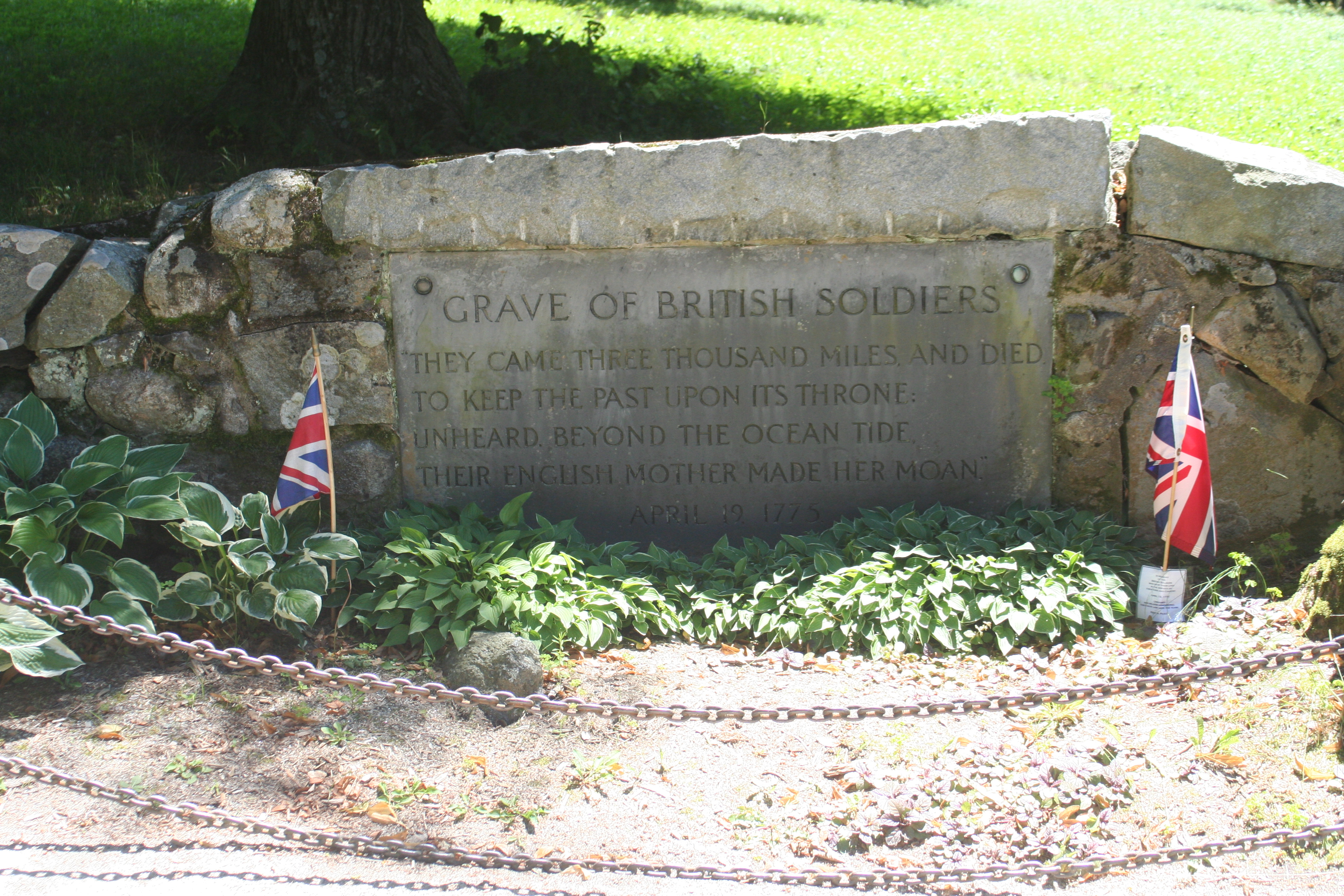
A 1910 marker for the grave of two British soldiers

Three British soldiers were killed during the Concord Fight. They were Privates James Hall, Thomas Smith, and Patrick Gray, all of the 4th Regiment of Foot. One of these men was carried to Concord center, died and was buried there. Two others died at the bridge and were buried adjacent to a stone wall forming the boundary of the Old Manse property. It is not known which of the three are buried at the Old North Bridge site. Initially, their graves were simply marked by two plain stones. Nathaniel Hawthorne, who resided at the Old Manse for a time, called these a "humbler...yet more interesting" token of the Concord Fight than the 1836 Battle Monument.

In 1875, a granite slab simply inscribed, "Grave of the British Soldiers" was installed in time for the centennial. In 1910 residents of Concord placed a more substantial granite marker inscribed with a stanza from James Russell Lowell's 1849 poem, "Lines, Suggested By the Graves of Two English Soldiers On Concord Battle-Ground:"

They came three thousand miles and died
To keep the past upon its throne:
Unheard, beyond the ocean tide,
Their English Mother made her moan.

After President Ford's speech during the United States Bicentennial in 1975, Sir Peter Ramsbotham, the British Ambassador to the United States, laid a wreath on the graves of British soldiers buried at the foot of the bridge.
