= Lexington History Museums =

Historical society in Massachusetts, United States

- Formation: 1886
- Type: Historical Society
- Coordinates: 42.4486711°N 71.2277306°W
- Executive Director: Trenton Carls
- Website: https://www.lexingtonhistory.org/

Lexington History Museums, previously known as the Lexington Historical Society, is a non-profit historic preservation and interpretation organization headquartered in Lexington, Massachusetts. Founded in 1886, it conserves and celebrates Lexington's history, with a special emphasis on the town's important role in the beginning of the American Revolution.

The Society manages three nationally historic house museums: the Hancock–Clarke House, Paul Revere's Lexington destination; Buckman Tavern, the gathering place of the Lexington militia on April 19, 1775; and Munroe Tavern, temporary British field headquarters during the retreat from Concord to Boston. The Society's offices are located at the Lexington Depot, itself a museum of the town's history, located at 13 Depot Square in Lexington Centre. The Society also maintains an extensive collection of artifacts and archives.

An important part of the Society's mission is educational programs that focus on colonial life and the American Revolution for elementary, middle and high school students. The Society presents educational programs year-round in the restored Lexington Depot. The Depot is available for rental by Lexington community groups, residents and businesses.

== History ==
The Lexington Historical Society was founded in 1886 by Reverend Edward Porter and Reverend Carlton Staples, ministers of Lexington's Hancock Congregational Church and the First Parish Church. The two were involved in town committees, having served in the Committee on Historical Monuments and Tablets previously. The town's landmarks of its revolutionary history and the Battle Green were in a state of neglect, which inspired the two to establish a historical society. Its first meeting was held on March 1st 1886, where officers of the society were elected, its first relics accepted, and that year's reenactments of the Battle of Lexington were organized.

Among the Society's first publishing efforts comprised the Society's Proceedings - papers presented by members at Society meetings. From 1886–1910 they were regularly presented and constitute a certified source of reference among students and historians interested in Lexington's past. Early on the Society concerned itself maintaining an archive through the preservation and transcription of valuable records and documents of the town's history.

1894 marked Massachusetts' first commemoration of Patriots' Day as a legal holiday, which commemorates the Battles of Lexington, Concord, and Menotomy. This was the result of a successful lobbying initiative led by the Lexington Historical Society and other historical societies of Massachusetts. It was also involved in renaming the road the redcoats had taken from Boston to Concord Massachusetts Avenue. The society had held a Commemorative Service the Sunday before Patriots' Day, which was discontinued due to lack of interest. Among the notable speakers were Thomas Wentworth Higginson, Cyrus Hamlin, Henry Cabot Lodge, Edwin D. Mead, Curtis Guild, Samuel Eliot Morison, David Saville Muzzey, Albert Bushnell Hart, and Walter Prichard Eaton.

In 1891 the Historical Society undertook its maiden preservation project. The Old Belfry was acquired from James Monroe. After a much necessary refurbishment it was moved back to its original location on Clarke Street. However by 1909 it was again in a state of disrepair, and collapsed from the winds of a hurricane, where upon a replica was erected.

In 1897 Carlton Staples and the Society acquired the Hancock–Clarke House through membership donations and fundraising drives. It was moved across Hancock Street where after undergoing a meticulous restoration, it opened for tours. Munroe Tavern, which the British commandeered as a headquarters and field hospital during the battle, was bequeathed to the Society in 1911 by James Munroe, a direct descendant of patriot William Munroe, a veteran of the battle. Buckman Tavern and its surrounding land was acquired from the Stetson estate in 1914 by the town government, and leased to the Historical Society in successive 99-year leases. During World War I it hosted a Red Cross chapter and an emergency hospital, and much of the Society's activity was put to fundraising for the tavern's restoration, finally opening for tours in 1921. The society was heavily involved with the productions of the silent films America and The Eve of the Revolution.

The Hancock–Clarke House remained across the street from its original location until the lead up to the bicentennial of the Battle of Lexington. In October 1974 the house was put on rails and returned to its original location and orientation in a much publicized event culminating in a community-wide campaign of fundraising and support.

In 1999 the Lexington Historical Society bought the Depositor's Trust Bank building, which for most of its 153-year life had served as the town's central train station, and converted it into a community event space and Society headquarters. In 2024 and 2025, the Lexington Depot was transformed into a local history museum, and opened to the public for the Battle of Lexington's Semiquincentennial (250th anniversary) celebration.

== Gallery ==
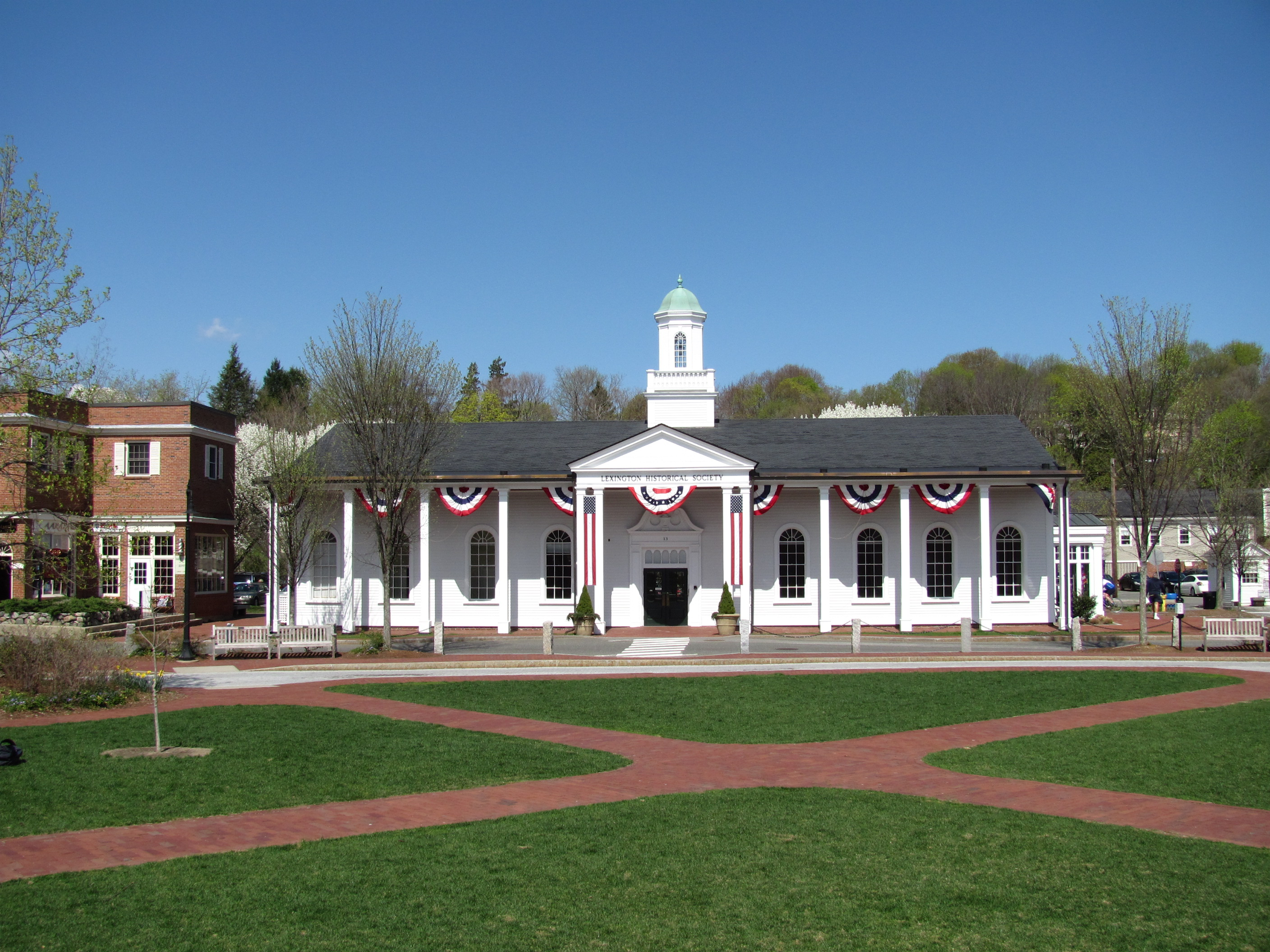
Lexington Depot

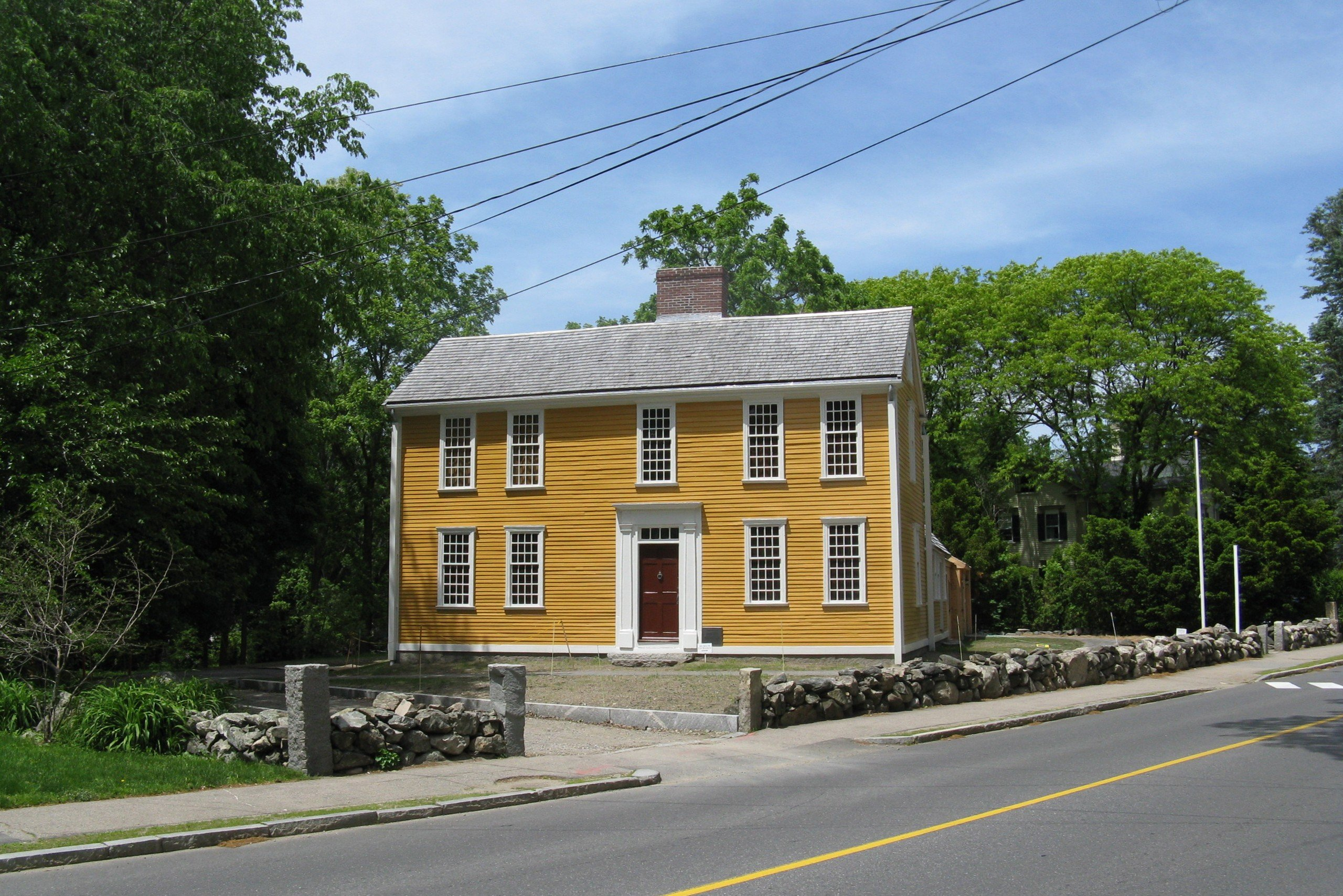
Hancock–Clarke House

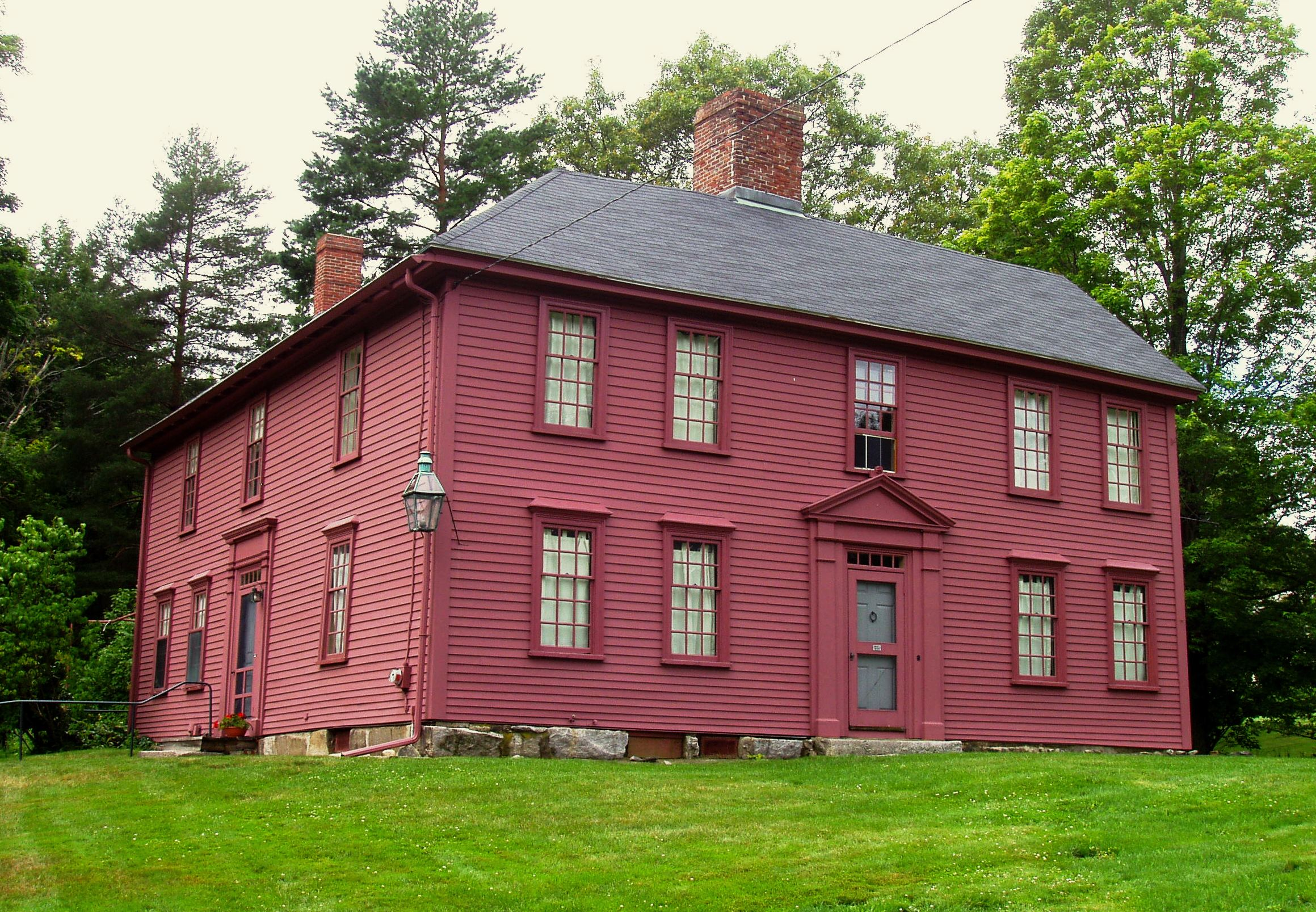
Monroe Tavern

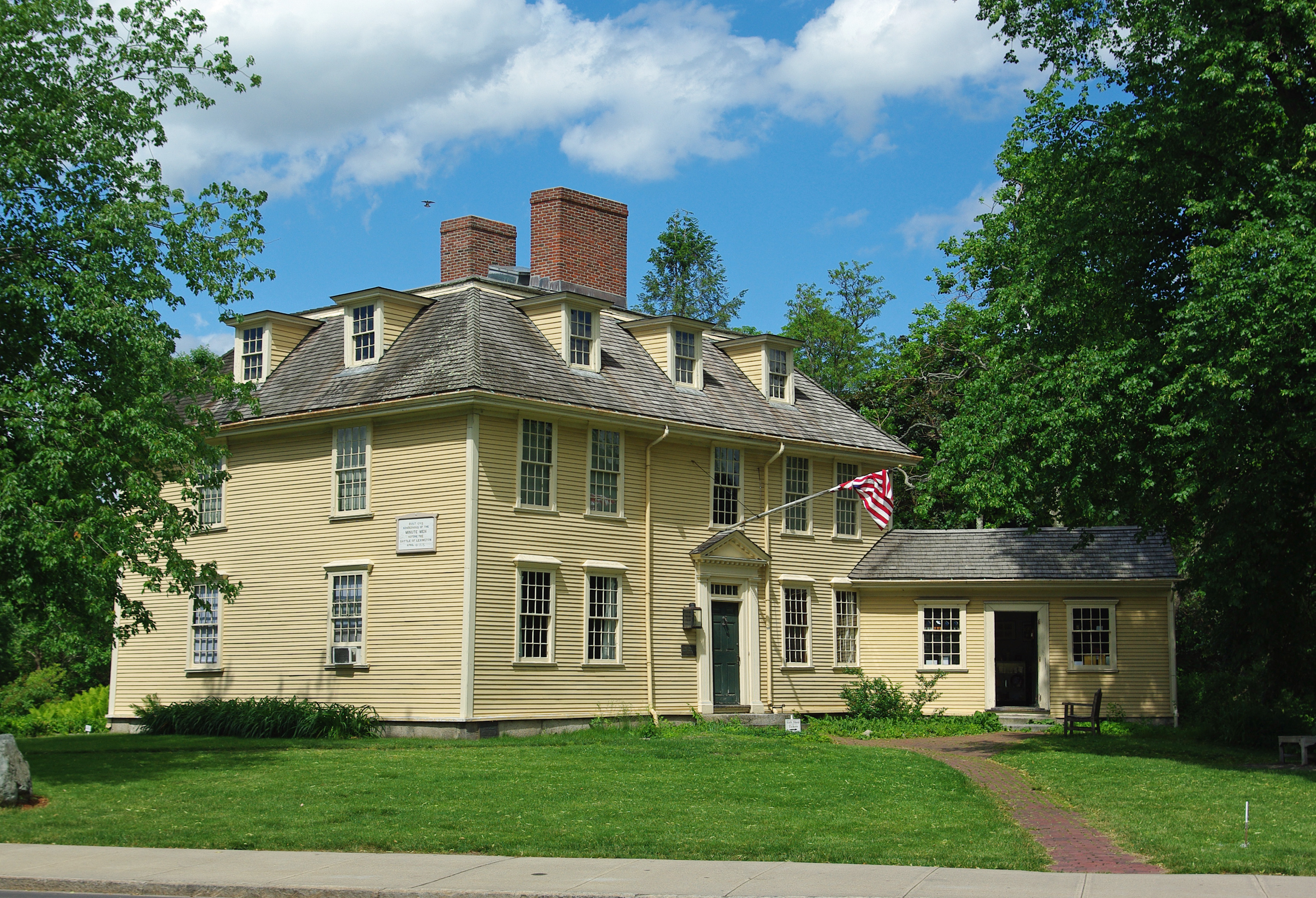
Buckman Tavern

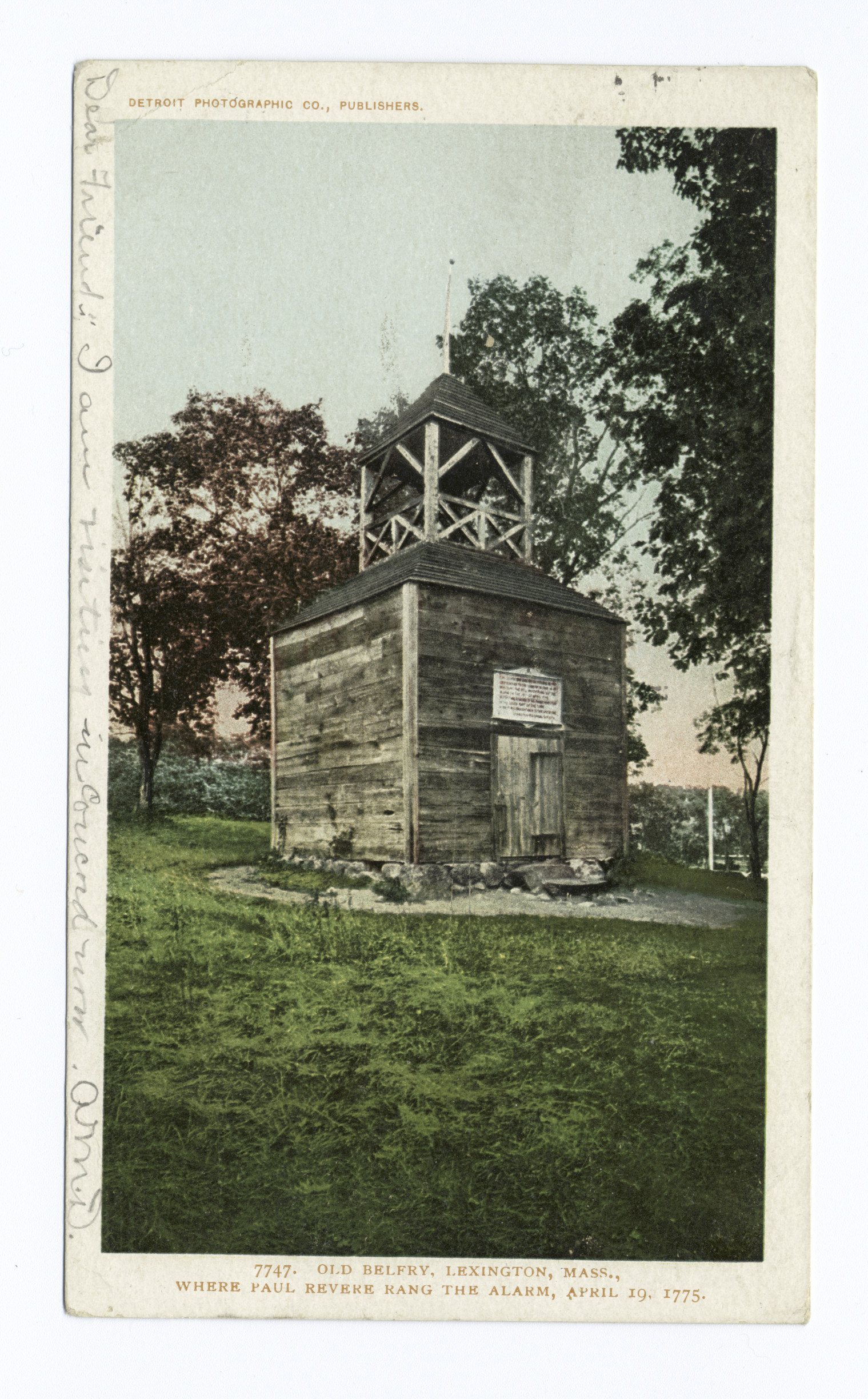
Old Belfry

== See also ==
- List of historical societies in Massachusetts
- John Fiske

== Sources ==
- Worthen, Edwin B.; Whipple, S. Lawrence (1986). A Brief History of the Lexington Historical Society: 1886 – 1986. Lexington, Massachusetts: Lexington Historical Society.
