= William Munroe =

William Munroe may refer to:

- William Munroe (American soldier) (1742–1827), American soldier in the American Revolutionary War
- William Munroe (Scottish soldier) (1625–1719), Scottish soldier
- William R. Munroe (1886–1966), United States Navy admiral

== See also ==
- William Munro (disambiguation)
- Billy Munro (disambiguation)
- William Monroe (disambiguation)
