= Prince Estabrook =

Massachusetts militiaman (1741–1830)

- Born: c. 1741
- Died: 1830 (aged 88–89); Ashby, Massachusetts
- Military career
- Allegiance: United States
- Branch: Massachusetts Militia
- Service years: 1775–1783
- Conflicts: American Revolutionary War: Battle of Lexington and Concord (WIA)

Prince Estabrook was a free Black-American man and Minutemen Private who fought and was wounded at the Battles of Lexington and Concord, the initial engagements of the American Revolutionary War. An undated broadside from the time identified him as "a Negro Man", spelled his name Easterbrooks, and listed him among the wounded from Lexington, Massachusetts. Born around 1741, he was enslaved by the family of Benjamin Estabrook from whom he most likely took his name. He was freed.

== Early life ==
Prince Estabrook was an enslaved black man owned by Benjamin Estabrook of Lexington. Nothing is known of Prince Estabrook's birth. If Prince was brought in from outside Lexington to live with the Estabrook family, his arrival should have been registered with the town selectmen. There is no such entry for Prince Estabrook. While the lack of registration is not definitive, it makes it more likely that he was born into the Estabrook home as the son of another enslaved man, Tony. Tony was enslaved by Benjamin's grandfather, Joseph Estabrook II, and was willed to his father, Joseph III. Estabrook family histories also state that Benjamin inherited Prince from his father.

By 1775, Prince would have been one of a few enslaved people in Lexington. Estimates range from as few as five to as many as 24. Slavery in New England was very different than slavery in the Southern United States, and Prince likely spent his days doing farm labor alongside of Benjamin and helping with household chores. There are also reports that Benjamin and Prince were quite friendly, even helping Benjamin sell horses.

== Battle of Lexington Green ==
Paul Revere rode into Lexington around midnight on April 19, 1775. A second rider who took a longer route, William Dawes, arrived about a half hour later. The pair of riders were dispatched to warn the town of Concord that British troops were marching toward it. The riders stopped to confer with John Hancock and Samuel Adams, who were staying with a cousin of Hancock, Jonas Clarke.

Shortly after the riders left to continue to Concord, Captain John Parker sounded the alarm to assemble the Lexington militia on the common sometime after 1 a.m. With no British troops in sight, the militia was told to disperse and stay in the area where they could hear the drums if called to reassemble. Many took up in Buckman Tavern directly across the street from Lexington Green.

When called to reassemble several hours later, an estimated 77 militia soldiers gathered on the green. The soldiers took a defensive stance as an estimated 700 British troops approached. Although law may have prevented him from training with the militia, Prince Estabrook was among those who answered the call.

As tensions rose between the two groups, a shot rang out. The source of the first shot is still unknown. The skirmish that followed left eight dead militiamen and nine injured. Among the injured was Prince Estabrook, who was wounded in the left shoulder. Several of the wounded, including Prince, were taken to the Estabrook home and were treated by Dr. Joseph Fiske.

== Continued service in the Continental Army ==
Prince Estabrook fully recovered from his injuries on April 19 and was back in action about two months later. During the Battle of Bunker Hill on the 17th and 18 June 1775, the men of Lexington Company were assigned to guard the headquarters of the newly formed Continental Army in Cambridge, Massachusetts. Prince Estabrook was among those who stood guard.

No record of Estabrook taking place in any further military activities until July 1776. Estabrook joined Colonel Jonathan Reed's regiment at that time, making its way to Fort Ticonderoga. Although the American fleet was defeated on Lake Champlain in the Battle of Valcour Island, the British never attacked the troops stationed at Fort Ticonderoga. The unit remained at Fort Ticonderoga until they were discharged on November 30.

Estabrook was again called to military service the following year. From November 6, 1777, to sometime in April 1778, Estabrook guarded British prisoners-of-war in Cambridge. In late July 1780, Estabrook signed a six-month enlistment and was discharged on April 7, 1781. In June 1781, he enlisted for another three years. Estabrook was a member of the Massachusetts Third Regiment and likely spent his time building forts in the New York area. The Massachusetts 3rd was permanently disbanded on November 3, 1783.

== Emancipation ==
In whatever way Prince gained his freedom, he remained with Benjamin's family upon his return. The 1790 census shows Benjamin Estabrook's household included a "non-white freeman" as a resident. Prince likely remained with Benjamin as a paid farmhand during this period. There is little known about his role in the community, aside from some stories that point to his being well-regarded by the residents.

Some sources point to Prince Estabrook being married during this time, but no marriage is recorded.

== Later life and death ==
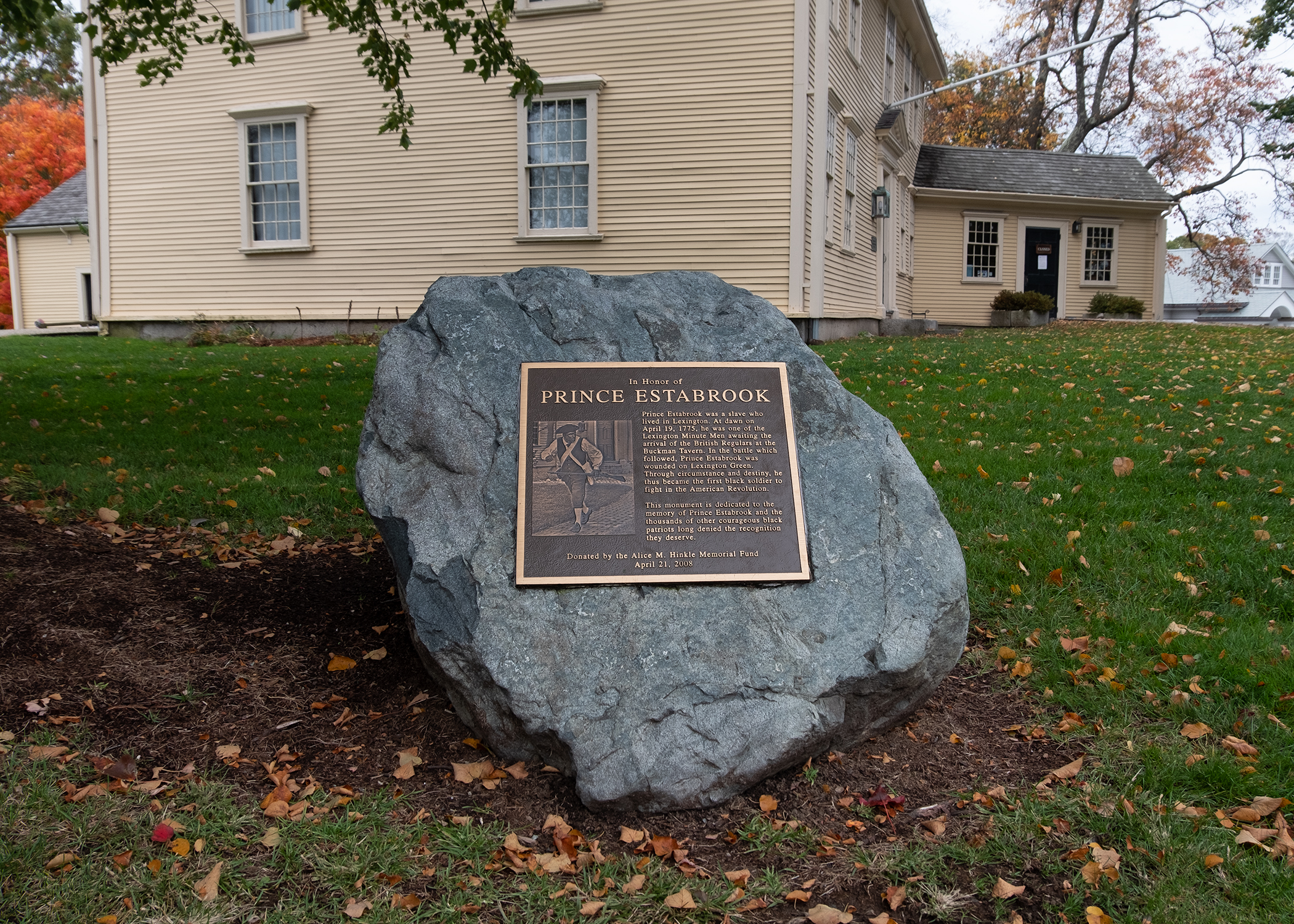
Prince Estabrook memorial in Lexington, Massachusetts.

Following Benjamin's death in 1803, the Estabrook family began to disperse. His son, Nathan, moved to land that belonged to Benjamin in Ashby, Massachusetts in 1805 after selling the house in Lexington. Around this time, Prince, who would have been in his mid-sixties, moved to live with Nathan in Ashby.

Prince Estabrook's age was estimated at 90 when he died of unknown causes in 1830. He was buried behind the Ashby Church, and his grave was marked simply as "Prince Estabrook, Negro". In 1930 the United States Department of War replaced the headstone with one recognizing his service during the American Revolutionary War. The town of Ashby once held ceremonies to commemorate Black History Month at his gravesite, but the site goes virtually unrecognized today.

== Memorials ==
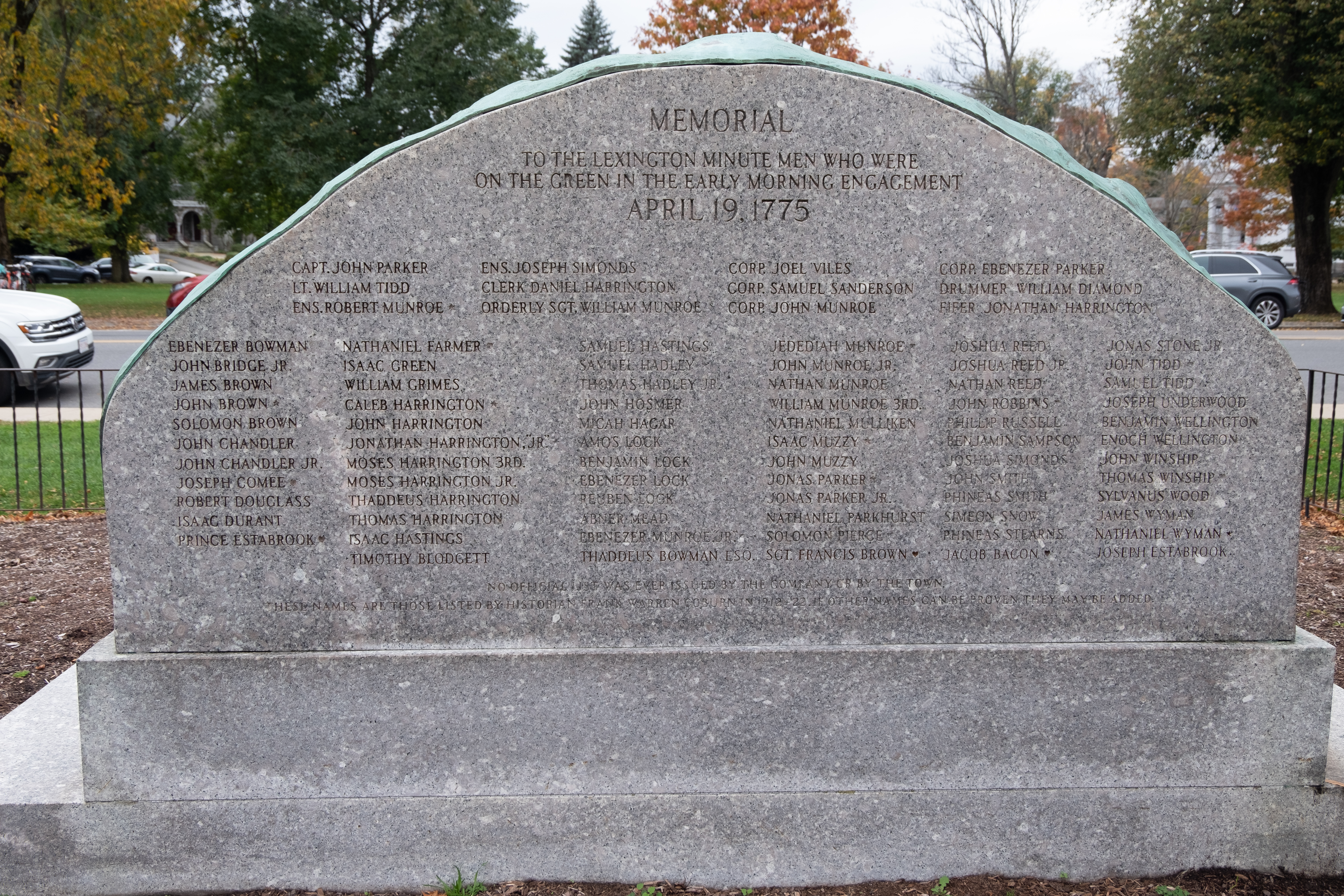
Minuteman Memorial in Lexington, MA. Estabrook's name can be seen in the lower left with a heart indicating he was injured.

Lexington honored Prince Estabrook with a monument in front of Buckman Tavern in 2008. The inscription reads:

In Honor of Prince Estabrook -- Prince Estabrook was a slave who lived in Lexington. At dawn on April 19, 1775, he was one of the Lexington Minute Men awaiting the arrival of the British Regulars at the Buckman Tavern. In the battle which followed, Prince Estabrook was wounded on Lexington Green. Through circumstances and destiny, he thus became the first black soldier to fight in the American Revolution. -- This monument is dedicated to the memory of Prince Estabrook and the thousands of other courageous black patriots long denied the recognition they deserve. -- Donated by the Alice Hinkle Memorial Fund -- April 21, 2008

Prince Estabrook is also listed with the names of the Lexington Minutemen who were present on April 19, 1775. He has a small heart following his name, indicating that he was among those injured.
