= Lexington Centre =

Geographic and retail center of Lexington, Massachusetts

Coordinates: 42°26′53.8″N 71°13′41.4″W

Lexington Centre (often spelled Center since the 1980s), often simply called the Center by locals, is both the geographic and retail center of Lexington, Massachusetts, on Massachusetts Avenue. It is home to numerous restaurants, banks, retail shops, beauty parlors, a small cinema, a museum, the Cary Memorial Library, and many historic landmarks, including Lexington Common.

== History ==
Although settled in the early 18th century, and site of the community's church, by 1830 there were only 2 or 3 stores in the center. The arrival of the railroad in 1846 prompted more development. The Boston and Maine Railroad operated passenger rail through the centre until January 1977 (under the auspices of the Massachusetts Bay Transportation Authority (MBTA) after 1965), stopping at Lexington Depot. The former Depot building still stands, and is today the headquarters of the Lexington Historical Society. The Minuteman Bikeway exists today on the old railroad right-of-way.

The most well-known historic landmark in Lexington is the Common at the junction of Mass. Ave. and Bedford Street (Routes 4 and 225) It is the site of the Battle of Lexington and the first shots of the American Revolutionary War. This has earned it the nickname "Birthplace of American Liberty," which is painted on the flagpole visible over much of the centre.

== Gallery ==
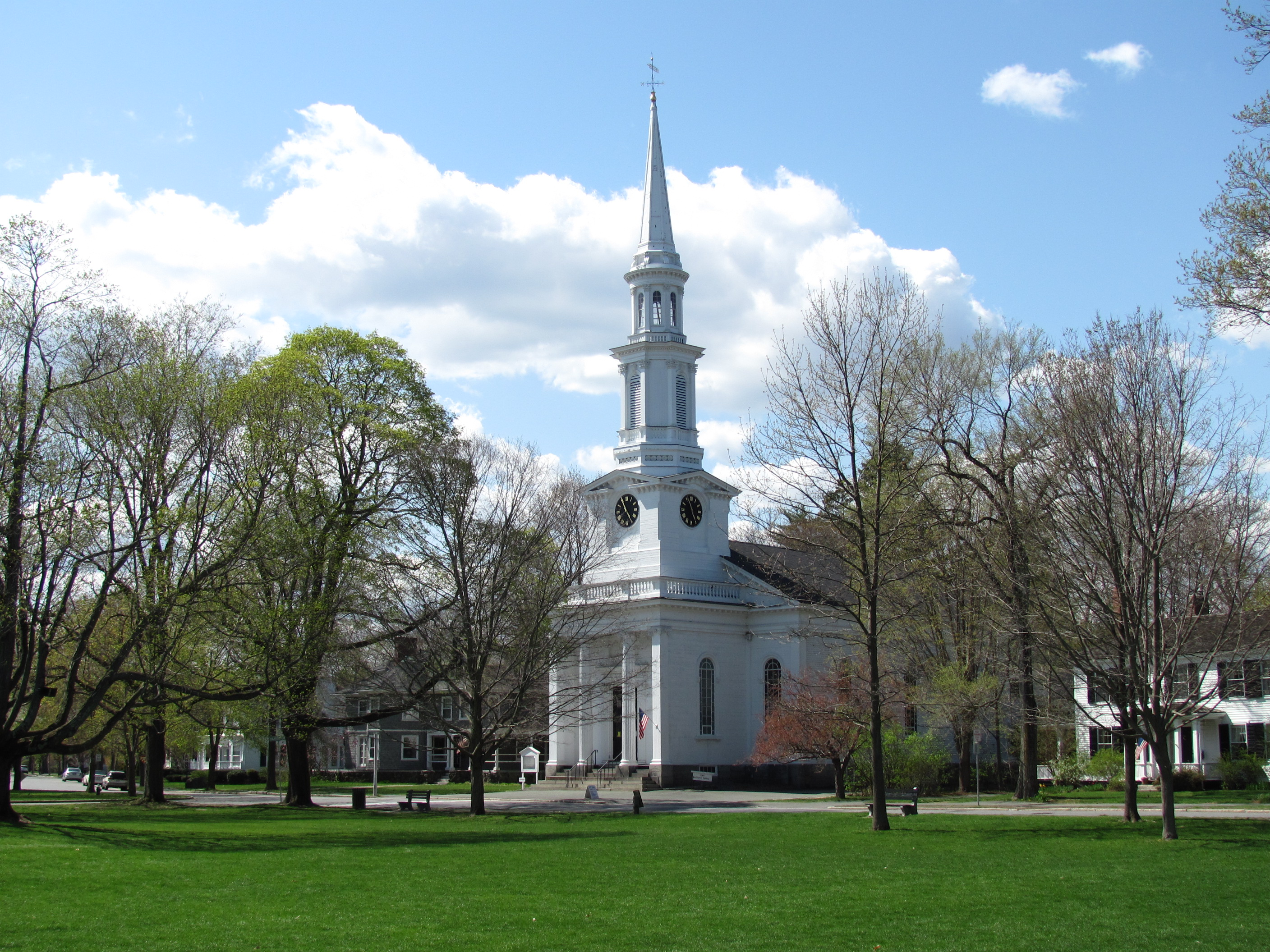
First Parish Church

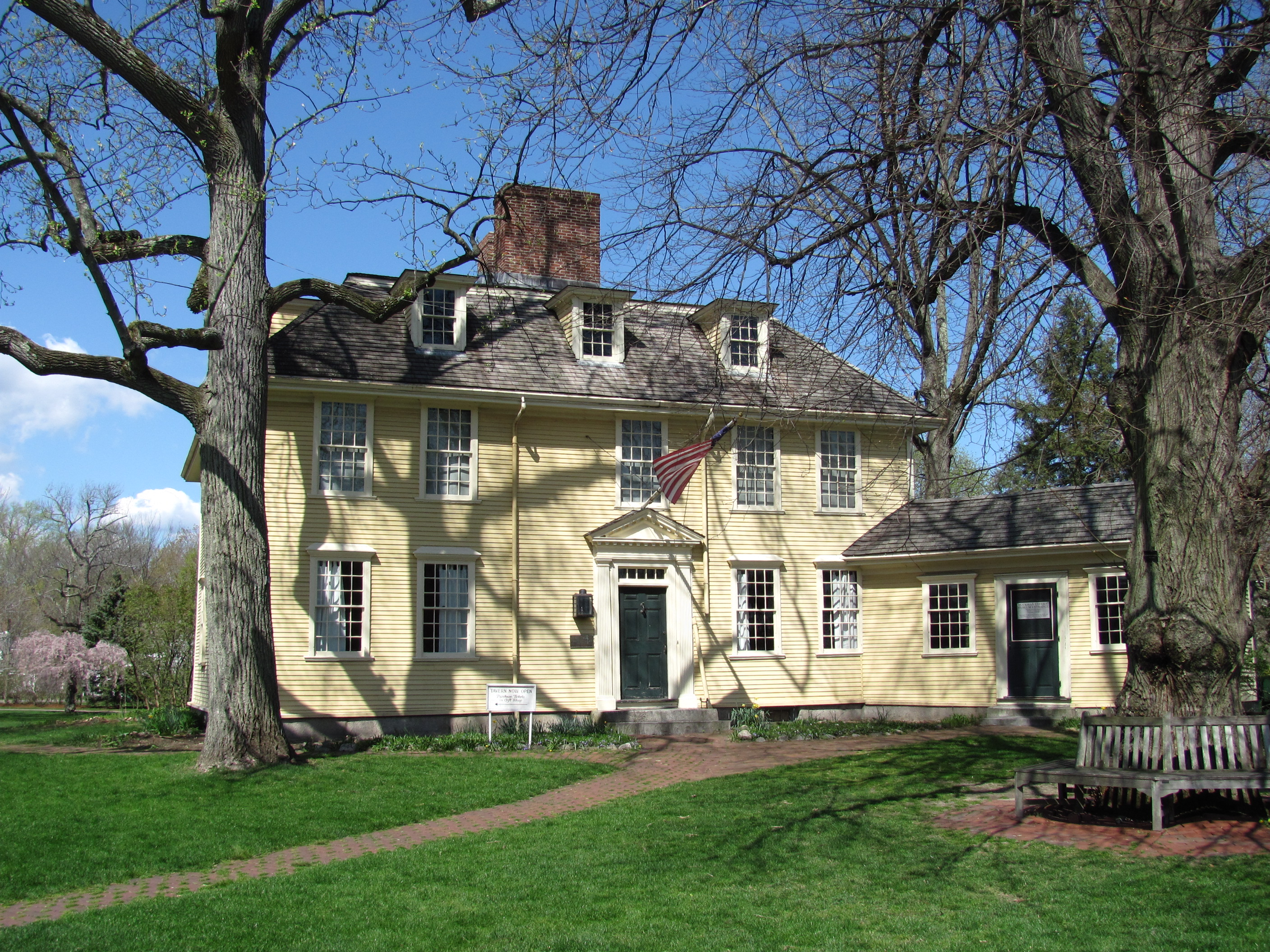
Buckman Tavern

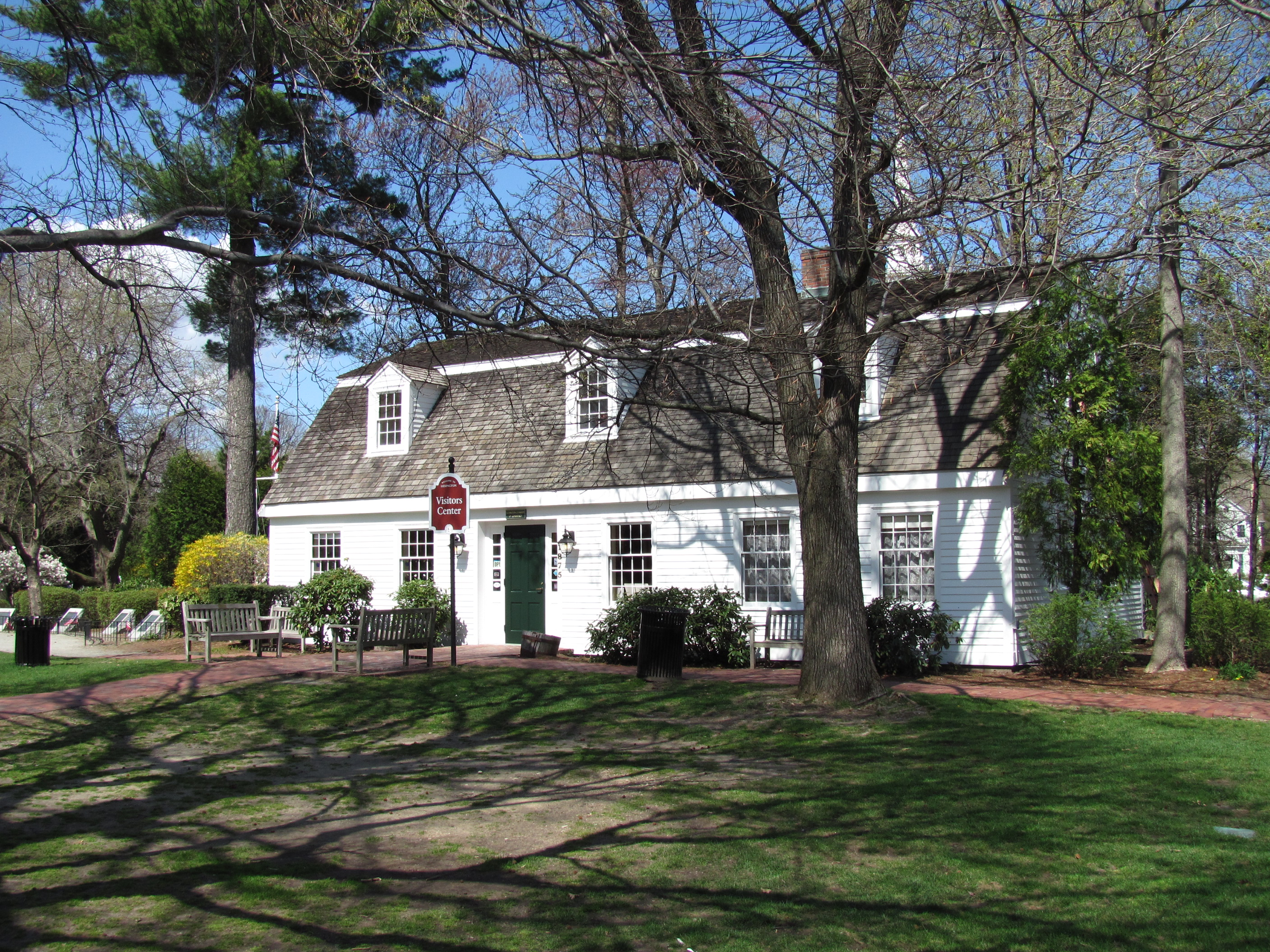
Visitor Center

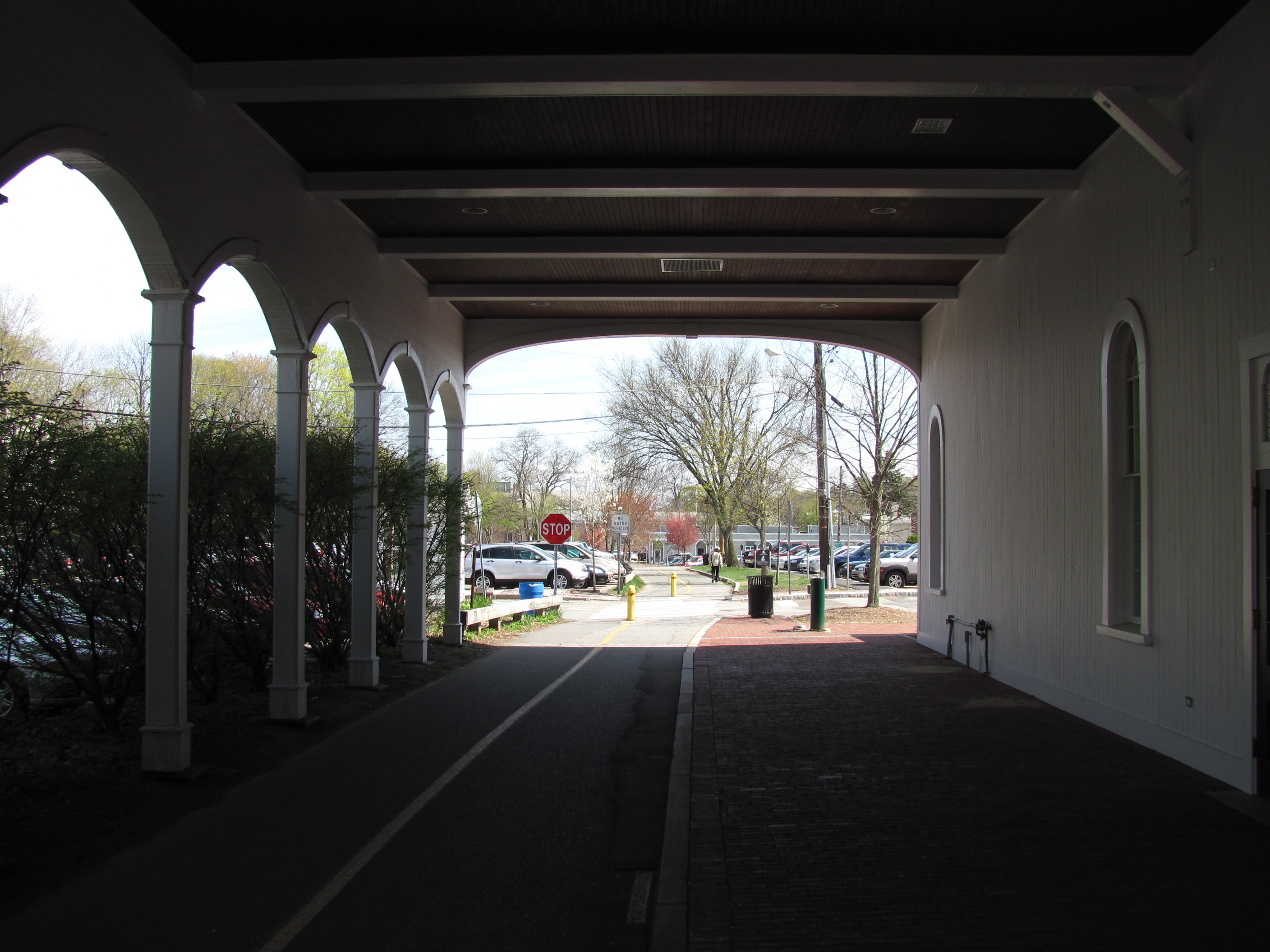
Minuteman Bikeway passing through Lexington Depot

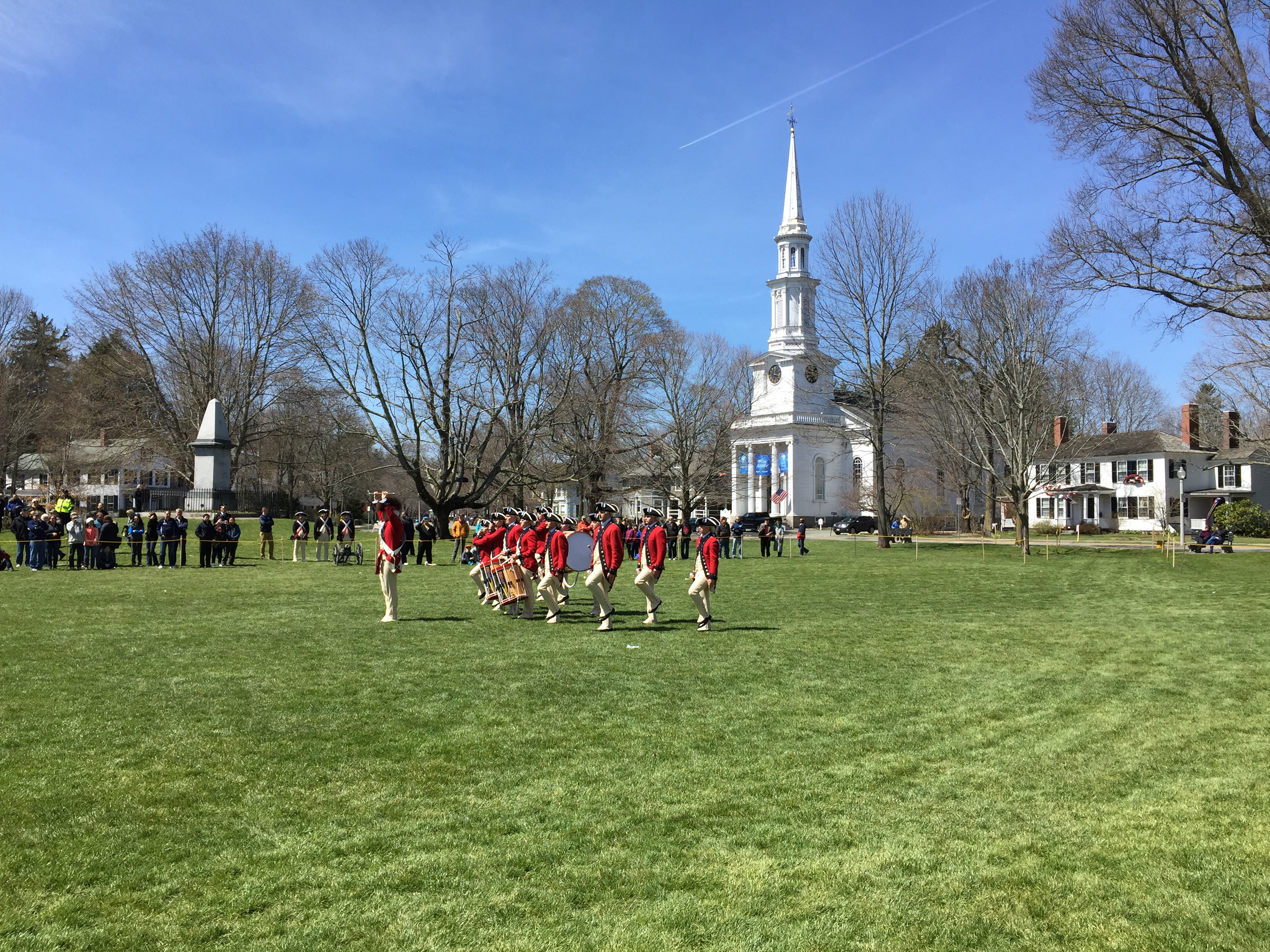
The Battle Green on Patriots' Day weekend 2018
