= William Munro =

William Munro may refer to:

- William Munro (British Army officer) (1818–1880), English army officer, plant collector and botanist
- William A. Munro (born 1992), Australian rugby player
- William B. Munro (1875–1957), Canadian historian and political scientist
- William H. Munro (1860–1918), Canadian politician
- William Henry Allan Munro (1856–1913), architect in Queensland, Australia
- William Munro, 12th Baron of Foulis (died 1505), Scottish clan chief
- William Munro (cricketer) (1862–1896), English-born Australian cricketer
- William Munro (politician) (c. 1836–1900), state senator in South Carolina
- Billy Munro (rugby union) (William Hutton Munro, 1918–1970), Scottish rugby union player
- Bill Munro (William Davidson Munro, 1934–2023), Scottish football player and manager
- Will Munro (William Grant Munro, 1975–2010), Toronto artist, club promoter, and restaurateur
- Jack Munro (William James Munro, 1873–1948), British trade unionist

== See also ==
- William Munroe (disambiguation)
