= Munroe Tavern (Lexington, Massachusetts) =

- U.S. National Register of Historic Places
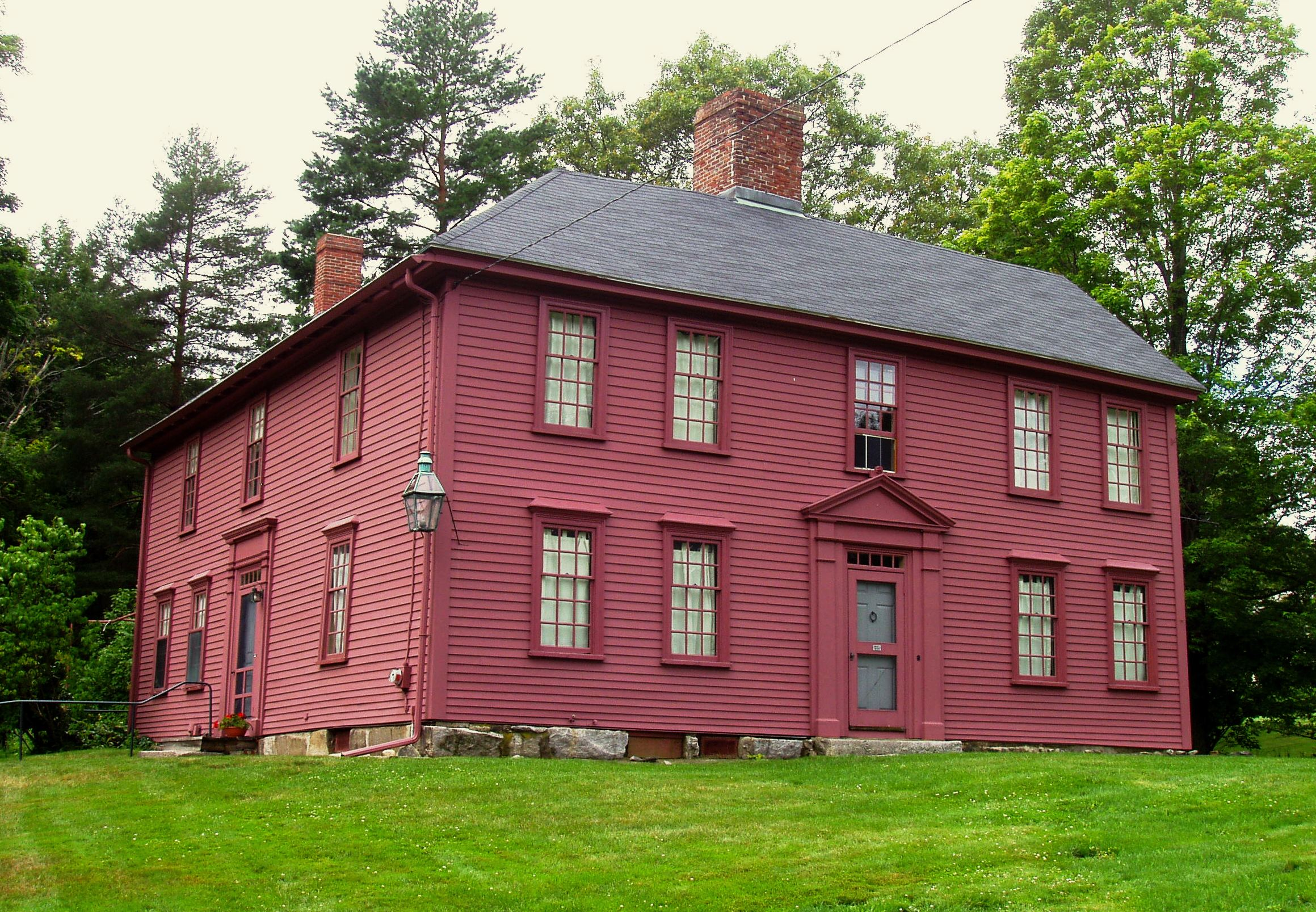

- Location within Massachusetts Location within the United States
- Location: Lexington, Massachusetts
- Coordinates: 42°26′28.8″N 71°12′58.6″W
- Built: 1731
- NRHP reference No.: 76000248
- Added to NRHP: April 26, 1976

Munroe Tavern, located at 1332 Massachusetts Avenue, Lexington, Massachusetts, is an American Revolutionary War site that played a prominent role in the Battle of Lexington and Concord. It is now preserved and operated as a museum by the Lexington Historical Society, with exhibits highlighting the role and perspective of the British soldiers during the outbreak of the war. The house is open for guided tours on weekends starting in April and daily from Memorial Day weekend until the end of October.

The Munroe family line in America was begun by William Munroe (1625–1719), who was transported (along with his brothers) to New England in 1651 following his capture at the Battle of Worcester. The earliest part of the Tavern was constructed in 1735 on land then owned by David Comee. Later the proprietor rights were given to others. Another William Munroe (1742–1827), the great-grandson of the original William, purchased the house in 1770, and in October 1774 was granted a taverner's license from the town, shortly before the outbreak of hostilities in April 1775.

On April 18, 1775, one day before the outbreak of the battle, Munroe Tavern was a meeting spot for colonials, owned by William Munroe, orderly sergeant of Captain John Parker's militia company, and proprietor of the tavern until 1827. At 6:30 p.m. that evening, Solomon Brown of Lexington, who had gone to the market in Boston, returned and reported to Munroe that he had passed a patrol of British soldiers.

A large force of British troops arrived at Lexington before dawn the next morning, and shots were exchanged on the town common, beginning the Battles of Lexington and Concord. That afternoon the tavern served as the headquarters for Col. Hugh, Earl Percy, and his one thousand reinforcements. The British occupied the tavern for one and one-half hours, during which time the dining room was converted into a field hospital for the wounded, while exhausted British troops consumed liberal quantities of food and drink, compelling John Raymond, a lame private in Parker's company of minutemen who had fought against the soldiers earlier, to serve as their bartender. When Raymond attempted to escape through the door, the drunken soldiers shot and killed him.

President George Washington dined at the Munroe Tavern when he visited the Lexington battlefield in 1789. An upstairs room now contains the table and chair at which he sat and documents relating to his trip.

In the late 19th century, a Munroe descendant who owned the house rented out part of it to artist Edwin Graves Champney (1842–1899). The house was added to the National Register of Historic Places in 1976.

The Lexington Historical Society now employs the Tavern for the Museum of the British Redcoats, providing a view of April 19, 1775 from the perspective of the King's troops. The building underwent renovation and restoration work in 2010–2011.

== Popular culture ==
Munroe Tavern appears in the 2012 video game Assassin's Creed III.

== See also ==
- Buckman Tavern, the muster point for the Lexington militia, and also a museum
- National Register of Historic Places listings in Middlesex County, Massachusetts
