= Old Belfry =

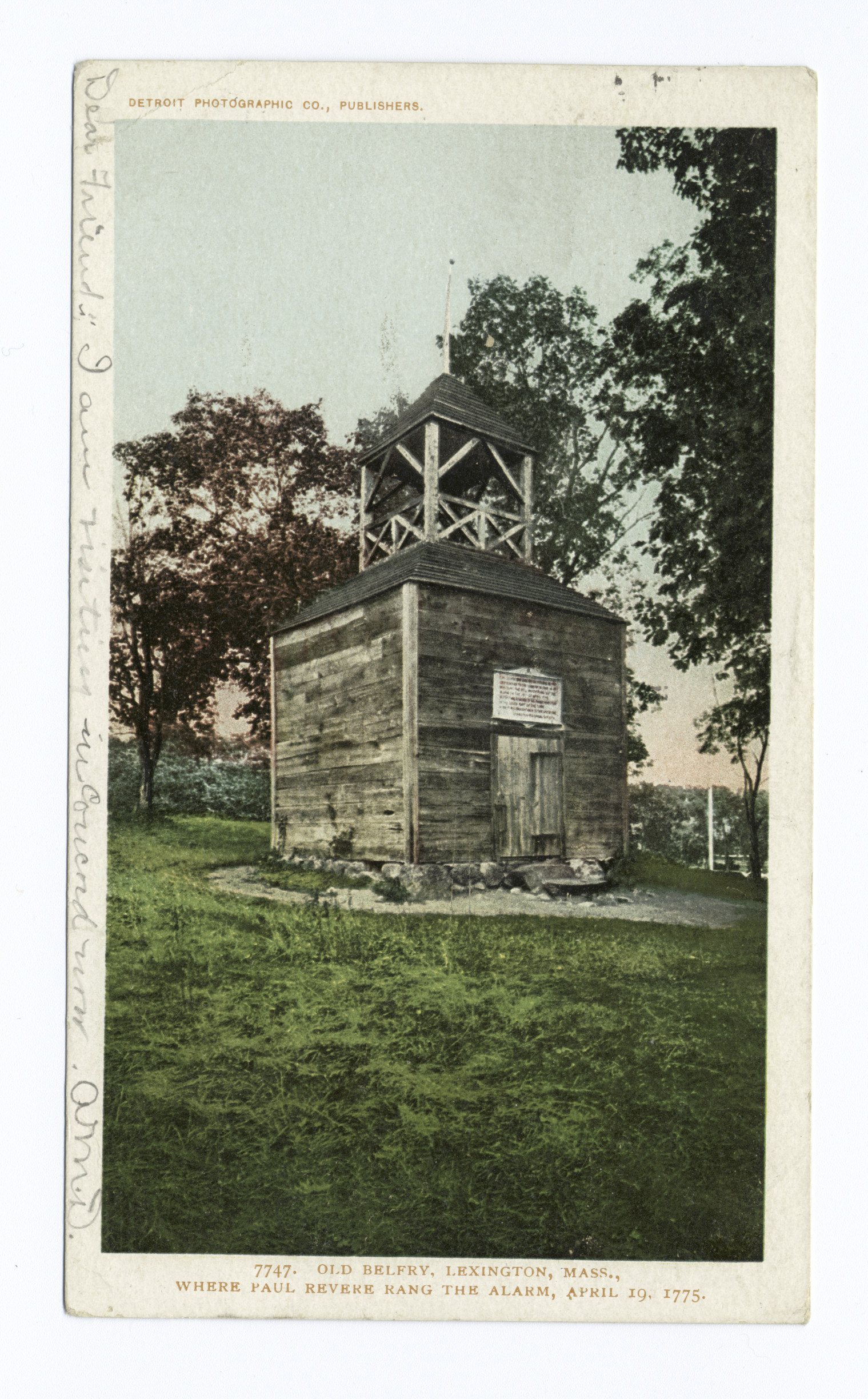
- The Old Belfry, pictured in the first half of the 20th century
- Interactive map of the Old Belfry area

General information
- Type: Belfry
- Architectural style: Colonial
- Location: Lexington, Massachusetts, U.S.
- Coordinates: 42.44822°N 71.23085°W
- Completed: 1762 (264 years ago)

The Old Belfry is a historic structure on Clarke Street in Lexington, Massachusetts, United States. It stands on Belfry Hill.

The belfry was erected at its current location in 1762, but it was moved a few yards away to Lexington Common in 1768, after Jonas Monroe, on whose land it originally stood, wanted the town to pay him taxes for keeping it there. (Its former location on the Common is now marked by a boulder and a plaque.) The bell that hung in it summoned locals to worship, reminded them at 9:00 pm to "rake up the fires and go to bed", warned them of danger, tolled on their deaths, and rang out the initial alarm of what became the Battles of Lexington and Concord on April 19, 1775. Today it rings in the beginning of Patriots' Day annually at 5:30 am.

The third incarnation of the structure was built, this time with a steeple to house the bell, in 1794. Three years later, the belfry was moved to the Parker Homestead in the southern part of town and used as a wheelwright's shop by the son of John Parker. In 1891, after it had fallen into a much-dilapidated state, it was refurbished and returned to its original location by the Lexington Historical Society after it was gifted to them by James S. Monroe. It was destroyed in a gale on June 20, 1909, and was rebuilt by March the following year. It was moved from the back end of Belfry Hill to its present site in 1913, with an iron fence erected around it.

In 1971, the Katharine Harrington House at the corner of Clarke Street and Massachusetts Avenue was torn down to make way for Belfry Hill Park.

== Bell ==
Isaac Stone donated a new bell to the town of Lexington in 1761. It weighed 463 pounds. At a town meeting on June 15 of that year, it was decided to "hang ye Bell on ye top of ye Hill upon ye North side of Liet Jonas Munroes house."

Between 1:00 am and 2:00 am on April 19, 1775, the bell summoned the local militia to Lexington Common, just after Paul Revere and William Dawes had passed through. After a scout arrived to tell Captain John Parker that the British Regulars were just over a mile away, the bell was rung for a second time, summoning the 77 Minutemen.

Today's bell was made in the 19th century, but the original bell tongue is now stored at the Hancock–Clarke House. The bell was replaced again in March 1964, a donation by William Maloney and which formerly hung in Wilmington Methodist Church.

== Gallery ==
Pictured in the background of Stand your ground by Don Troiani, 1985

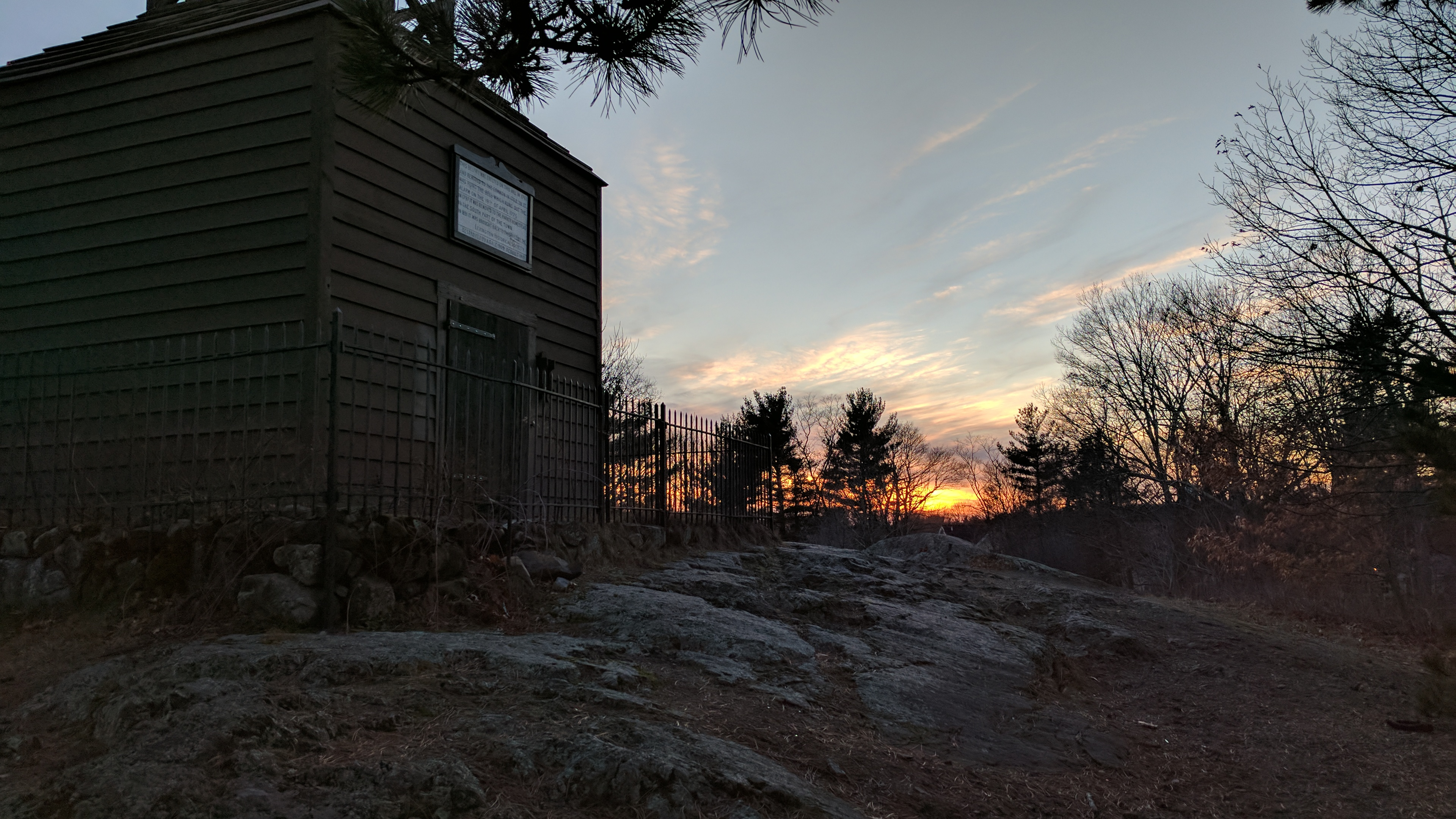
The front of the building

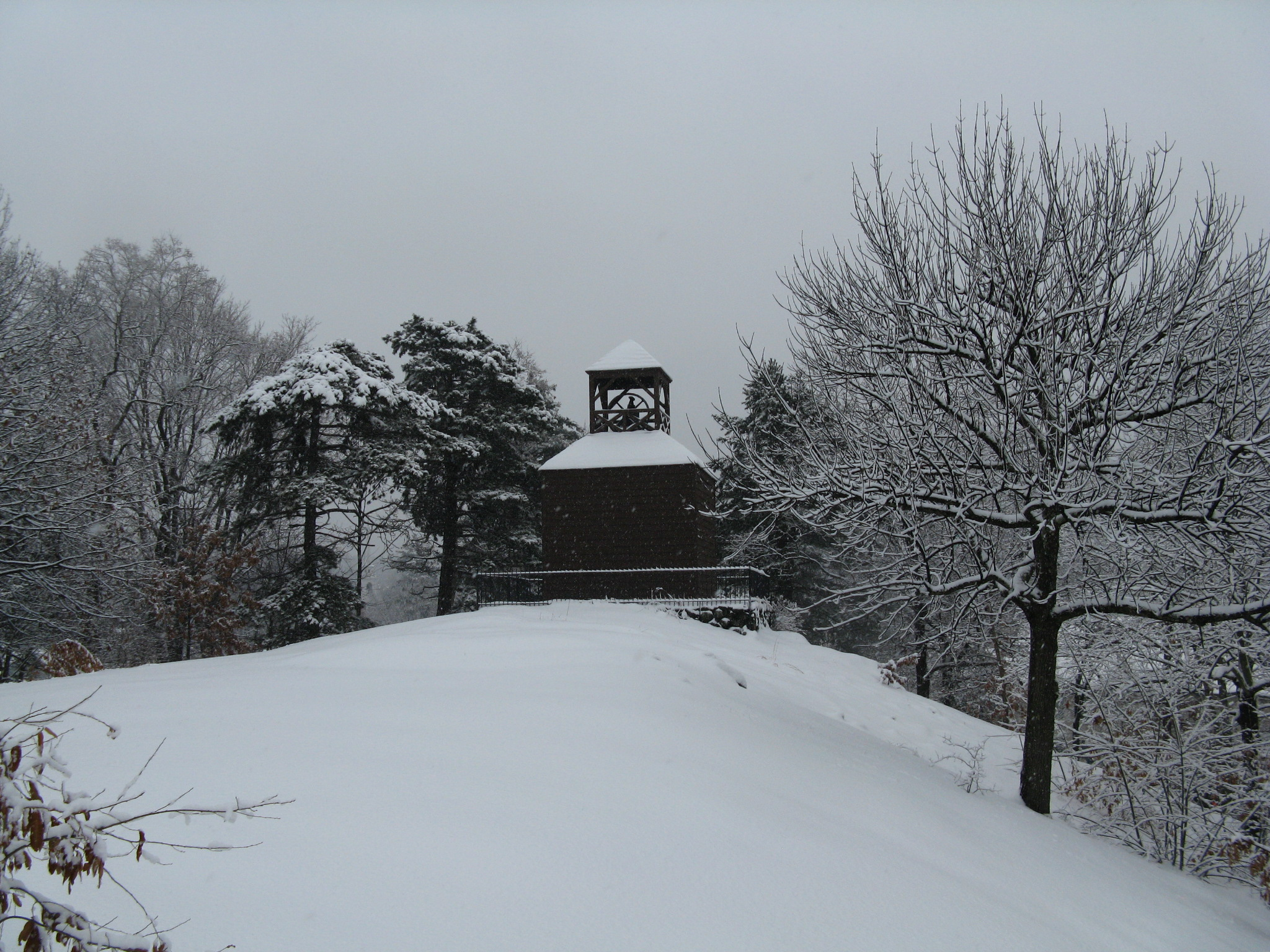
A view of the hill on which the belfry sits

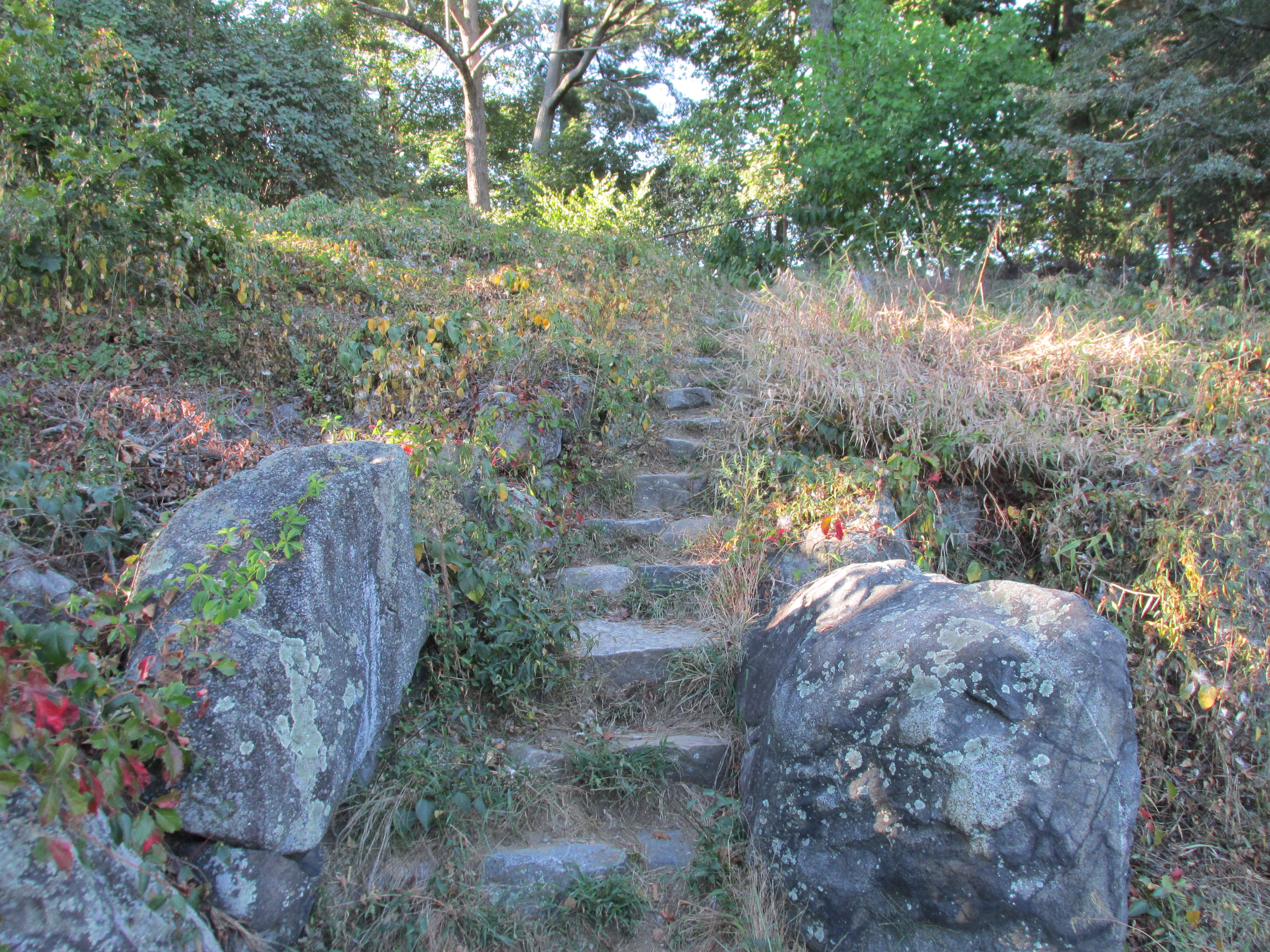
Steps up to the belfry
