= William Monroe =

William or Bill Monroe may refer to:

- Bill Monroe (1911–1996), American bluegrass musician
- Bill Monroe (1900s infielder) (c. 1877–1915), Negro league baseball player
- Bill Monroe (1920s infielder), Negro league baseball player
- Bill Monroe (journalist) (1920–2011), American journalist and NBC News correspondent
- Will Seymour Monroe (1863–1939), American writer and educator
- William Newton Monroe (fl. 1879–1881), founder of Monrovia, California
- William Monroe, for whom William Monroe High School in Virginia was named in 1925
- William T. Monroe, United States Ambassador to Bahrain in 2004–2007
- William Monroe, character in the 2020 film Inheritance

== See also ==
- William Monroe Trotter (1872–1934), American banker and activist
  - William Monroe Trotter House, a Boston landmark
- William Munroe (disambiguation)
