= William A. Munro =

- Born: William Anthony Munro; 29 September 1992 (age 34) Sydney, Australia
- Height: 192 cm (6 ft 4 in)
- Weight: 107 kg (236 lb; 16 st 12 lb)

Rugby union career
- Position: Lock
- Current team: Glendale Raptors
Senior career
Years	Team	Apps	(Points)
2013	Randwick DRUFC		
2014	NSW Country Eagles		
2015	Greater Sydney Rams		
2019	Glendale Raptors		
International career
Years	Team	Apps	(Points)
2017-	Australian Barbarians		

William Anthony Munro (born 29 September 1992) is an Australian rugby player who has represented NSW in the Australian National Rugby Championship. He played for the NSW Country Eagles squad in 2014 and Greater Sydney Rams in 2015 while studying at the University of Sydney.

Munro began his first-grade rugby career debut in 2013 playing for the Randwick DRUFC where he won best and fairest award. From January 2017, Munro has played matches for the Australian Barbarians, the Hong Kong Football Club, the Classic Wallabies and French Fédérale 1 league team AS.Mâcon. In January 2019, Munro was signed onto the Glendale Raptors to play in the 2019 season.

In December 2022, he was charged MDMA possession at a Sydney festival.

== See also ==
- Australian Barbarians
