= William Munroe (Scottish soldier) =

17th-century Scottish soldier

William Munroe (1625–1717) was a 17th-century Scottish soldier who later became a settler in the Thirteen Colonies and a Freemason.

== Lineage ==
According to historian Alexander Mackenzie, William Munroe was born in 1625, third son of Robert Munro, Commissary of Caithness, who in turn was the third son of John Mor Munro, 3rd of Coul, a descendant of George Munro, 10th Baron of Foulis. However, Y chromosome DNA testing of paternal descendants of William Munroe has confirmed that he was not descended from the Munros of Foulis.

== Battle of Worcester ==
He is one of four men by the surname of Munroe recorded as being captured at the Battle of Worcester in 1651 and transported to the Thirteen Colonies during the Wars of the Three Kingdoms as an indentured servant. He is likely to have been fighting alongside other men from the Clan Munro such as Sir Alexander Munro of Bearcrofts who was fortunate enough to escape.

William is almost certainly one of four men transported on the ship called the John and Sara, though the record of this has been damaged so that his first name is obscured. The names of the other three men are still fully visible on the ship's record.

== Marriages ==
William Munroe is known to be the ancestor of a vast family of Munroes in New England, United States. William married three times. He remained single for the first thirteen years after his arrival in Massachusetts, finally marrying about 1665. His first bride was Martha George, whose father once worked for Massachusetts governor John Winthrop. At the time of Martha's marriage, her father faced trouble with Puritan authorities for founding an illegal Baptist church in Charlestown. Martha died a few years after the marriage, leaving William to raise four young children.

William then married twenty-year-old Mary Ball of Watertown, a woman with a troubled past. Her parents were in and out of court on charges of beatings and neglect, amid hints that the mother was insane, and Mary herself had suffered judicial sanctions for an out-of-wedlock child. William brought stability to Mary's life, and they had ten children together during their twenty years of marriage.

His third wife was Elizabeth Johnson Wyer, a widow of a Scots tailor from Charlestown.

== Property ==
William began acquiring small pieces of land in Cambridge Farms, which is present-day Lexington, and he and his sons and a son-in-law purchased 100 acres (0.40 km^{2}) in 1695. With increased landholdings came greater status in the community, and he was made a freeman, chosen as one of the town Selectmen, and admitted as a member of the church. William died in 1717 aged 92.

== Descendants ==
In the 18th century, a descendant of his claimed to fire the first shot in the American Revolutionary War at the Battles of Lexington and Concord on 19 April 1775. Of the seventy-seven Lexington militiamen involved in the battle, eleven were Munroes, including Robert Munroe, who was one of the eight men killed, and Srg. (later Col.) William Munroe, who was the orderly sergeant. Munroe Tavern, which was used as a field hospital by Lt. Gen. Hugh Percy for retreating British soldiers, still stands in Lexington today. Munroe had many descendants in the Lexington area who also fought at the Battle of Lexington, including his great-great-grandson, Solomon Peirce, who was wounded in the battle. Edwin Munroe Bacon, was a writer and editor.
