= Jonas Clarke =

American pastor (1730–1805)

Jonas Clarke (December 25, 1730 – November 15, 1805), sometimes written Jonas Clark, was an American clergyman and political leader who had a role in the American Revolution and in shaping the 1780 Massachusetts and the United States Constitutions.

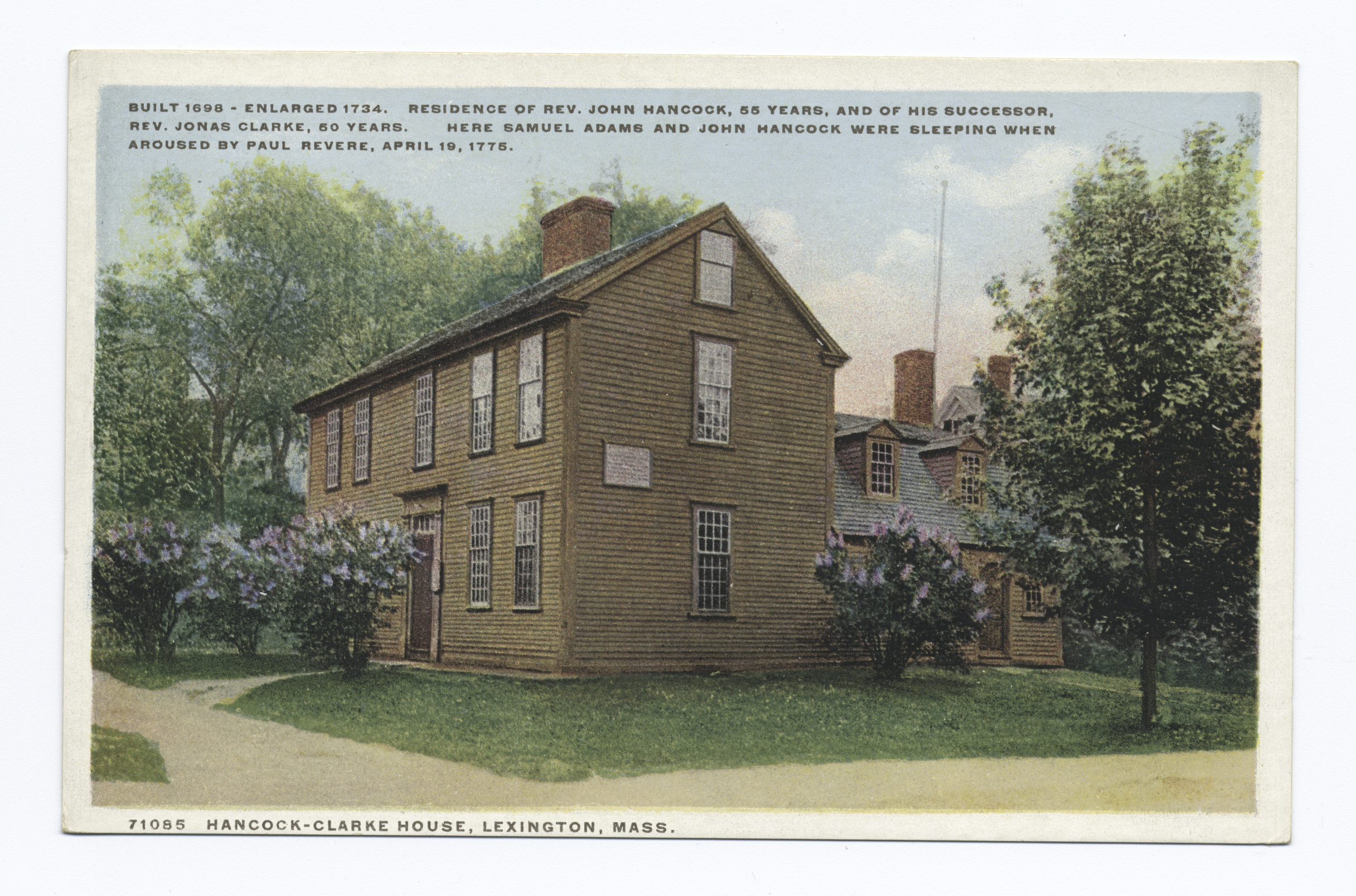
Hancock–Clarke House, 36 Hancock St., Lexington, Massachusetts.

Clarke graduated from Harvard College in 1752 and became the third pastor of the Church of Christ in Lexington, Massachusetts on May 19, 1755. He married Lucy Bowes Clarke. His wife's cousin was John Hancock, and Hancock was a guest in his home at the time of the Battles of Lexington and Concord in 1775.

Clarke is buried in the Old Burying Ground in Lexington, Massachusetts. His home, now known as the Hancock–Clarke House, still stands, and the Jonas Clarke Middle School in Lexington is named after him.
