= William Munroe (American soldier) =

American soldier (1742–1827)

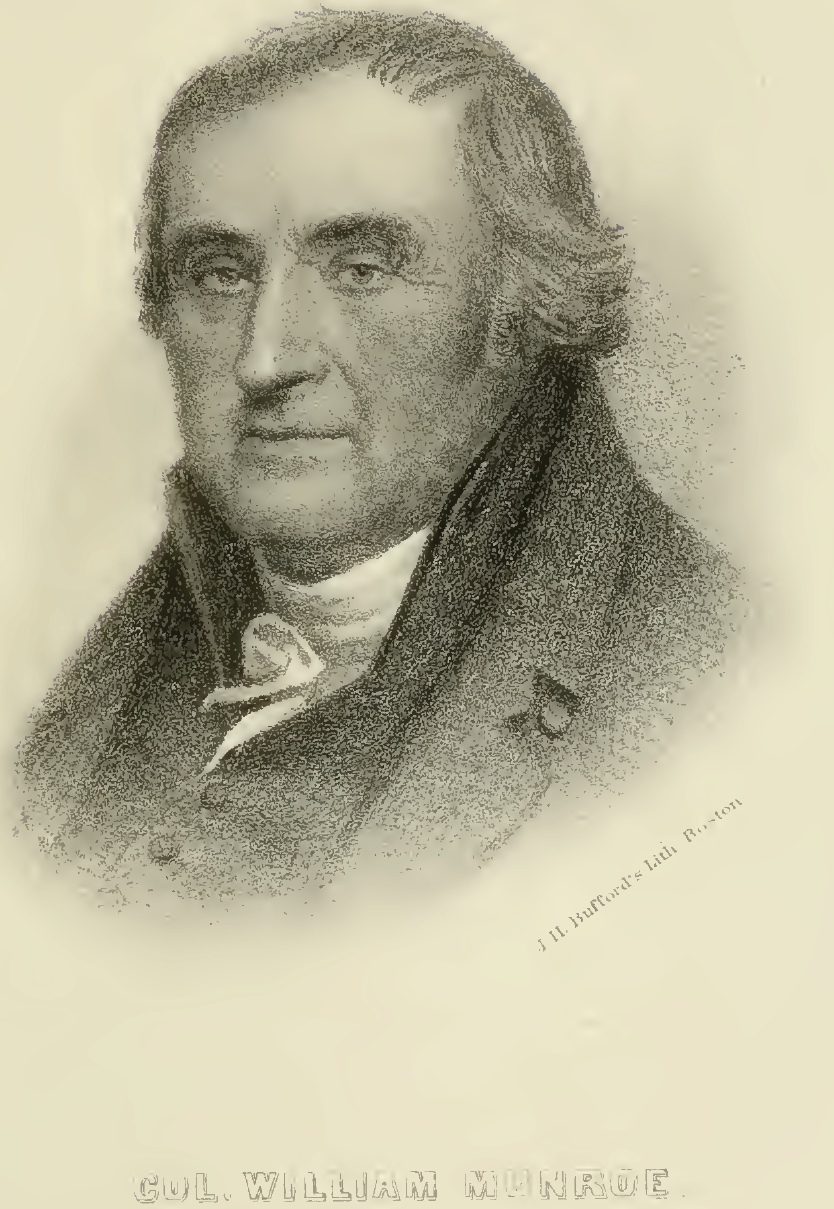
William Munroe at advanced age. Lithograph by John Henry Bufford date unknown.

Colonel William Munroe (October 28, 1742 – 1827) was a soldier in the American Revolutionary War. He was the orderly sergeant of the Lexington militia at the Battle of Lexington and Concord and as a lieutenant at the Battle of Saratoga. He was also a militia colonel and a prominent man politically in the town of Lexington.

== Ancestry ==
William Munroe was the great grandson of William Munroe, who was captured at the Battle of Worcester by Oliver Cromwell's troops, and taken to Boston as an indentured servant. He worked hard and quickly bought his freedom. He settled in the settlement of Cambridge Farms Parish (later Lexington, Massachusetts), Massachusetts, in a part of the town called Scotland.

== Family ==
William Munroe was married to Anna Smith and they had six children. After her death in 1781 he later married Polly Rodgers.

His obituary from the American Mercury (CT), Nov. 20, 1820, p. 1 reports: Death of another Revolutionary Hero.--

Died, at Lexington, on Monday, 29th ult. Col. William Munroe, aged 86. Col. M. was orderly sergeant in the battle of Lexington, April 19, 1775, the commencement of the revolutionary war. On the night of the 18th previous, when several British soldiers were seen proceeding on horseback towards the town, with the supposed intention of arresting John Hancock and Samuel Adams, Col. M. commanded the sergeant's guard, stationed for their protection at the house where those prescribed patriots were resident in Lexington. On the receipt of intelligence that 800 British troops were secretly marching the same route, Messrs. Hancock and Adams were persuaded to retire to Woburn, and Col. M. with is party joined the Lexington company, who were immediately after attacked before sunrise of the 1st, by the whole British force, and about 20 of the Lexington militia killed or wounded. The company were ordered by their commander to disperse; and the British troops proceeded to Concord, where they destroyed the provincial stores. Their triumph, however, was of short continuance; the British guard of 100 men, stationed about a mile beyond Concord village, at the North Bridge, were attacked by the militia of Concord and the neighboring towns, and forced to retire upon their main body, leaving two killed, and the same number wounded. About two hours afterward, when the British commenced their return march to Boston, they were again assaulted by the militia, until they arrived at Lexington, where they were waylaid and harassed by the Lexington company, and would probably soon have been forced to surrender, had they not been reinforced by Lord Perry's brigade of 1500 men. They were, however, beaten back to Boston. Col. M. participated with his company in the events of the day, leaving the care of his public house in the super-independence of a neighbor, whom the British killed on their retreat. Until within a year or two past, like Cincinnatus Col. M. labored on his farm. On the occasion of the visit of gen. Lafayette to Lexington, three years since, arm in arm these aged veterans reconnoitered the field of Battle, previous to the delivery of the address to Lafayette from the Lexington committee; and he assisted at the laying the foundation stone of the Bunker Hill Monument on the 17th June 1825. Col. M. has been ever esteemed by his fellow townsmen as well as by strangers, for his urbanity of manners and hospitality. As a member of the Legislature and in municipal stations, he was respected for information, judgement, and rectitude; and as a military officer, from a subaltern to a colonel, to which grade he rose, he was distinguished as an able tactician. It is productive of a melancholy and heartfelt sensation, to follow to the grave "the house appointed for all the living," one after another, those vast vestiges of "the times that tried men's souls." It seems like tearing from us our "household gods;" like removing the "ancient landmarks" of our nation's birth; the objects of all that is venerable and sacred, till the tale of revolutionary powers. But the consolation is, that they are gathered "like a shock of corn fully ripe," blessed with the grateful recollections of their enfranchised countrymen, full of honors and good works, to a better and happier state of existence.

== Businesses and occupations ==
Munroe owned two businesses in April 1775. One was his tavern, known as Munroe Tavern, and the other was a retail shop. Several pages of his ledger survive. He was also the orderly sergeant of the Lexington militia.

== Roles in the Battles of Lexington and Concord ==
William Munroe fought in the Battle of Lexington acting as orderly sergeant in the company commanded by Captain John Parker.

Later in the day, his home, Munroe Tavern, was occupied by Colonel Percy. Percy used the tavern as a field hospital and refuge for retreating troops.

In March 1825, fifty years after the battle, Munroe gave a sworn testimony about his activities on April 19, 1775.

== Roles in the Battle of Saratoga ==
William Munroe served at the Battle of Saratoga under the rank of lieutenant.

== Later life ==
William Munroe was a Captain in militia when he marched with a body of men towards Springfield during the Shays Rebellion in 1786. The Munroe family was visited by the first President of the United States, George Washington, in November 1789. He was a selectman for nine years and represented his town for two years.
