= Hancock–Clarke House =

Historic house in Massachusetts, United States

- U.S. National Register of Historic Places
- U.S. National Historic Landmark
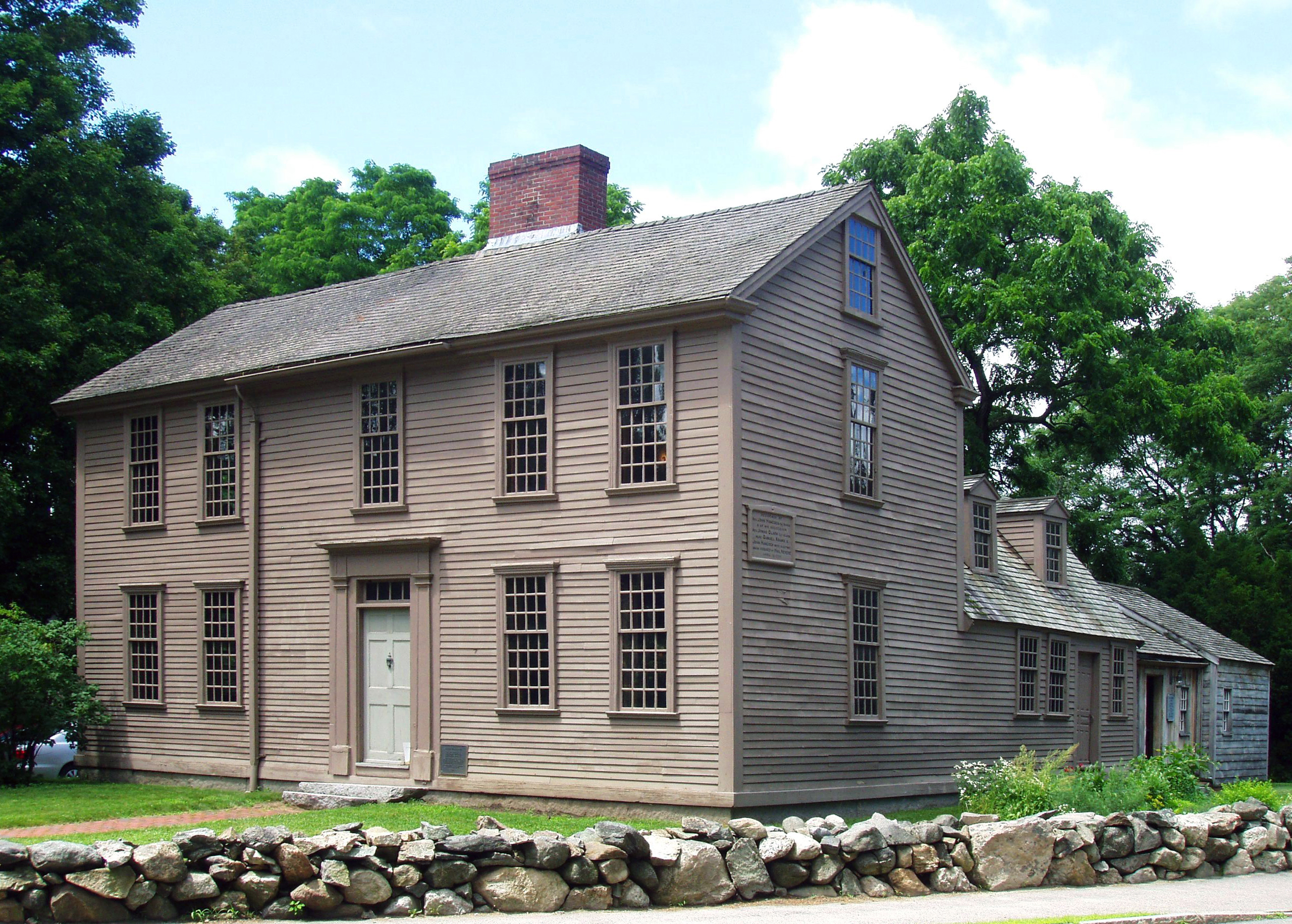
- The Hancock–Clarke House, Lexington, Massachusetts

- Location within Massachusetts Location within the United States
- Interactive map showing the location for Hancock–Clarke House
- Location: 36 Hancock Street, Lexington, Massachusetts
- Coordinates: 42°27′12.8″N 71°13′42.8″W
- Built: 1738
- Architectural style: Early Georgian
- NRHP reference No.: 71000895

Significant dates
- Added to NRHP: July 17, 1971
- Designated NHL: July 17, 1971

The Hancock–Clarke House is a historic house in Lexington, Massachusetts, which is now a National Historic Landmark. Built in 1738, the house is notable as one of two surviving houses associated with statesman and Founding Father John Hancock, who lived here for several years as a child. It is the only residence associated with him that is open to the public. It played a prominent role in the Battle of Lexington and Concord as both Hancock and Samuel Adams, leaders of the colonials, were staying in the house before the battle. The House is operated as a museum by the Lexington Historical Society. It is open weekends starting in mid-April and daily from May 30 to October 31. An admission fee is charged.

== Hancock and Clarke history ==
The Reverend John Hancock, grandfather of the American revolutionary leader of the same name, purchased this site in 1699. In 1738 he built this two-story timber-frame house. Rev. Hancock's son, Thomas, a wealthy Boston merchant, is said to have financed the construction. The front or main portion of the house consists of the 2 1/2-story structure with central chimney, a short center hall, two rooms on each of the two floors, and an attic. The small rear ell, 1 1/2 stories high with gambrel roof, contains a kitchen and tiny study downstairs and two low-studded chambers upstairs. As confirmed by dendrochronolgy, both portions of the house were built from trees felled in the same year, refuting a commonly held belief that the ell was built in 1698. Succeeding Hancock as minister in 1752, the Reverend Jonas Clarke, who reared 12 children in the parsonage, was an eloquent supporter of the colonial cause.

This house is one of two surviving residences associated with John Hancock, famous American patriot, President of the Continental Congress, first signer of the United States Declaration of Independence, and the first Governor of the Commonwealth of Massachusetts. It became his boyhood home in 1744 when, upon the death of his father at Quincy, the seven-year-old boy came to live at this house with his grandfather. In 1750 John joined his childless uncle, Thomas Hancock, a wealthy Boston merchant who adopted him.

On the evening of April 18, 1775, John Hancock and Samuel Adams, having attended the Massachusetts Provincial Congress in Concord and wary of returning to Boston, were guests of Rev. Clarke. Fearing that they might be captured by the British, Dr. Joseph Warren of Boston dispatched William Dawes and Paul Revere to Lexington with news of the advancing British troops. Arriving separately, they stopped to warn Hancock and Adams around midnight, then set off for Concord. Hancock and Adams made their way to Burlington to avoid capture.

== Later history ==
The house remained in the Clarke family until 1844, maintained by Rev. Clarke's daughters. It thereafter changed hands several times before being acquired by the Lexington Historical Society. The building was threatened with demolition in 1896, at which time the society purchased it and moved it across the street. In 1974, after purchasing the original site, the society moved it back to its original location. The house was declared a National Historic Landmark in 1971, and listed on the National Register of Historic Places.

This house contains furnishings and portraits owned by the Hancock and Clarke families and an exhibit area that includes relics of April 19, 1775.

== See also ==
- List of National Historic Landmarks in Massachusetts
- National Register of Historic Places listings in Middlesex County, Massachusetts
