= Lexington Battle Green =

Park in Lexington, Massachusetts

- Lexington Green
- U.S. National Register of Historic Places
- U.S. National Historic Landmark
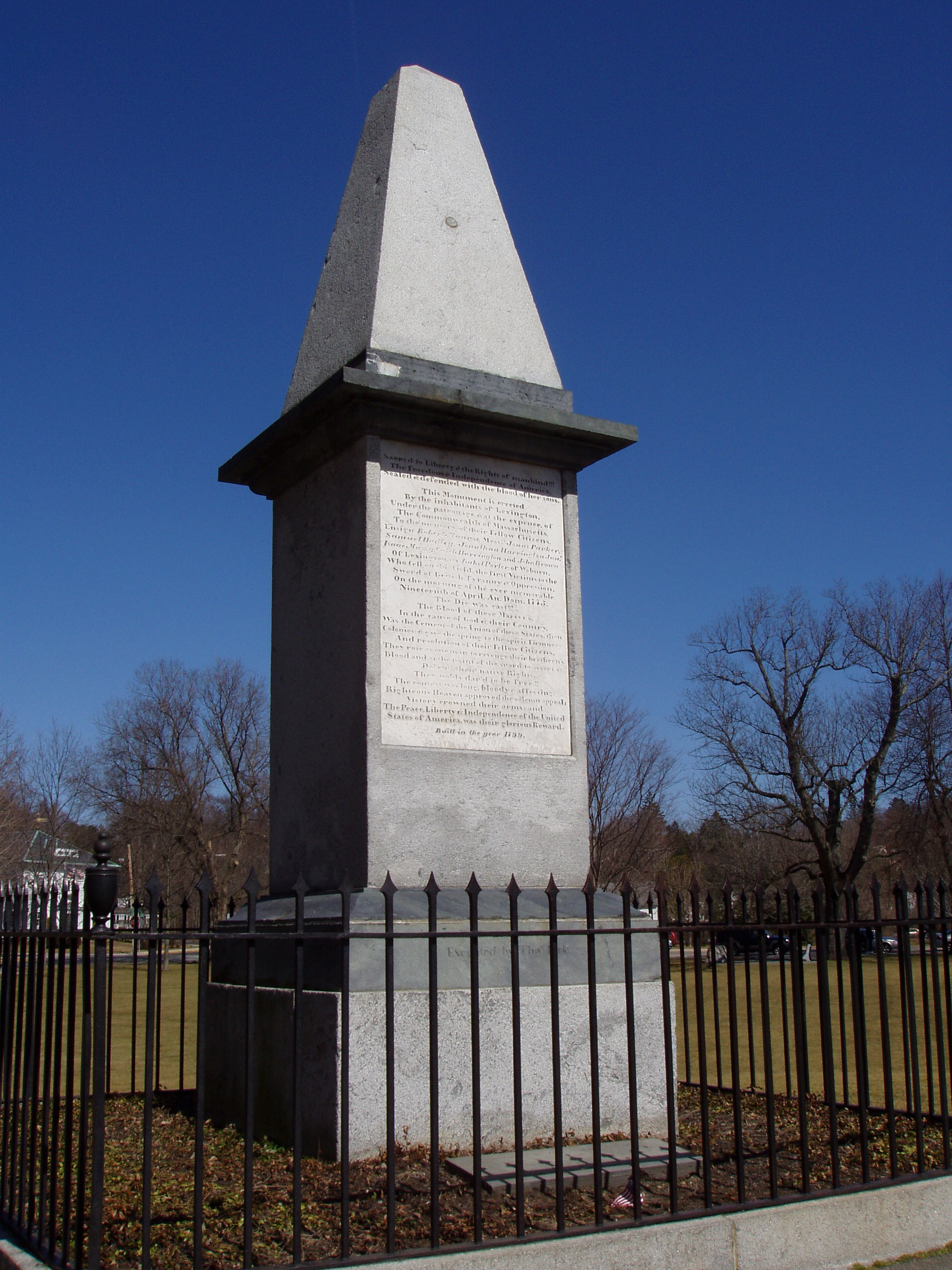
- The Revolutionary Monument, 1799, on the western edge of the common
- Location: Massachusetts Avenue and Harrington Road, Lexington, Massachusetts, U.S.
- Coordinates: 42°26′58″N 71°13′53″W
- Built: 1711
- NRHP reference No.: 66000767

Significant dates
- Added to NRHP: October 15, 1966
- Designated NHL: January 20, 1961

The Lexington Battle Green, also known as Lexington Common, is the historic town common of Lexington, Massachusetts, United States. It was at this site that the opening shots of the Battles of Lexington and Concord were fired on April 19, 1775, starting the American Revolutionary War. Now a public park, the common is a National Historic Landmark.

== History ==
Unlike many other towns, Lexington did not set aside a separate common area when the town was laid out. In 1711, the townspeople raised funds by subscription, and purchased 1.5 acres (0.61 ha) of land as a militia training ground. This was enlarged by one more acre in 1722. The common is a triangular parcel of land, bounded by Massachusetts Avenue, Bedford Street, and Harrington Road, and is located just northwest of Lexington's commercial center. The Buckman Tavern, one of the area's busiest local taverns, stands across Bedford Street; it is also a National Historic Landmark.

On April 19, 1775, local militiamen emerged from Buckman Tavern adjacent to the common and formed two rows on the common to face arriving British troops. The militiamen suffered the first casualties of the American Revolution.

== Description ==
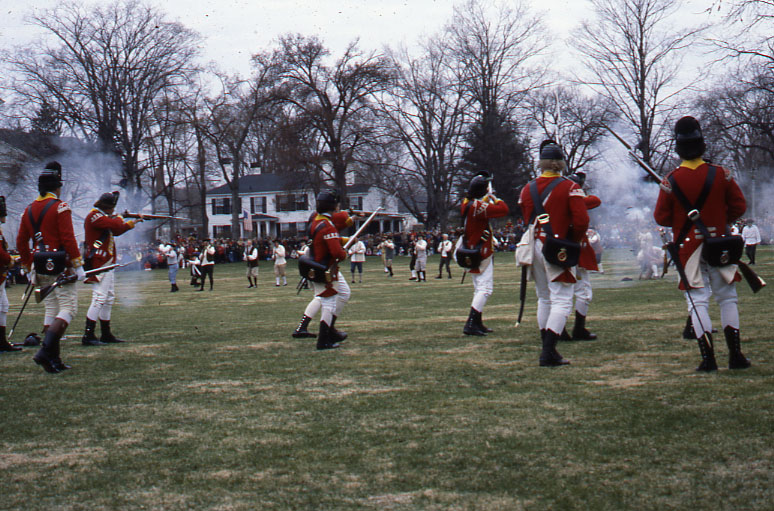
Reenactors on the green in 2025, during the 250th anniversary of the battle

The battle green, now a public park, is a grassy expanse with a few mature trees. There are several memorials on the fringes of the common, the most iconic being the statue representing Captain John Parker, the leader of the Lexington militia, which stands at its eastern corner. It was erected in 1900 at the bequest of Francis Brown Hayes, and was sculpted by Massachusetts artist Henry Hudson Kitson.

A bronze plaque, placed in 1910 by the Daughters of the American Revolution, marks the original location of the Old Belfry. The Belfry was moved several times before being destroyed by a gale in 1909. It was rebuilt the following year and is now located on a hill just south of the park. Near the western corner of the park stands what is considered the oldest memorial to the Revolution: the Revolutionary War Monument, a granite obelisk erected in 1799. In 1835, the remains of seven of the eight militiamen killed in the battle were exhumed from the nearby Old Burying Ground and reburied within the monument's iron fence. The monument also marks the approximate western end of the Patriot line. The line's eastern end is marked with an inscribed boulder.

The battle green is one of only eight locations in the United States where the U.S. flag is specifically authorized by law to fly twenty-four hours a day, though the U.S. Flag Code (4 U.S.C. §4-10) allows for the flag to be displayed anywhere "24 hours a day if properly illuminated during the hours of darkness." The flag pole was dedicated in 1976 to commemorate the battle's bicentennial. The pole is a National Historic Landmark.

Inside the municipally-operated Lexington Visitors Center is a diorama depicting the Battle of Lexington.

== Gallery ==
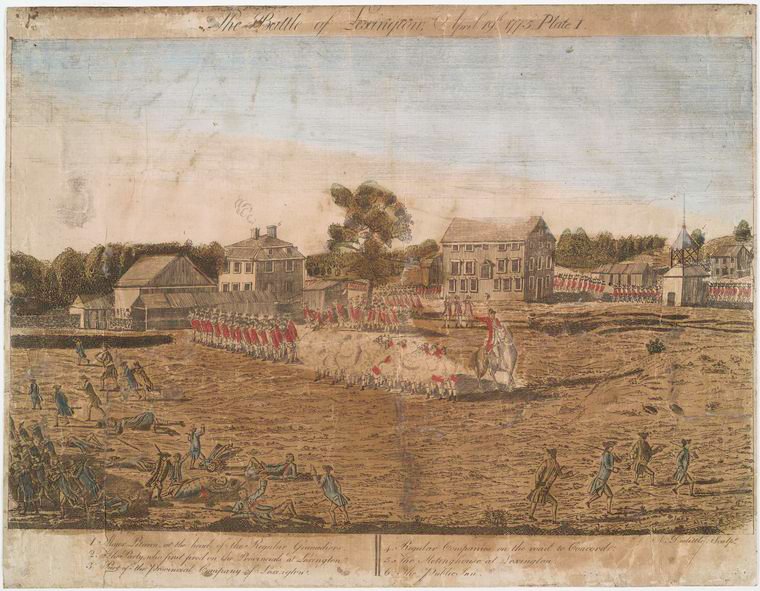
Amos Doolittle's engraving of the Battle of Lexington (Note: The Buckman Tavern is building # 6 left of the tree at center.)

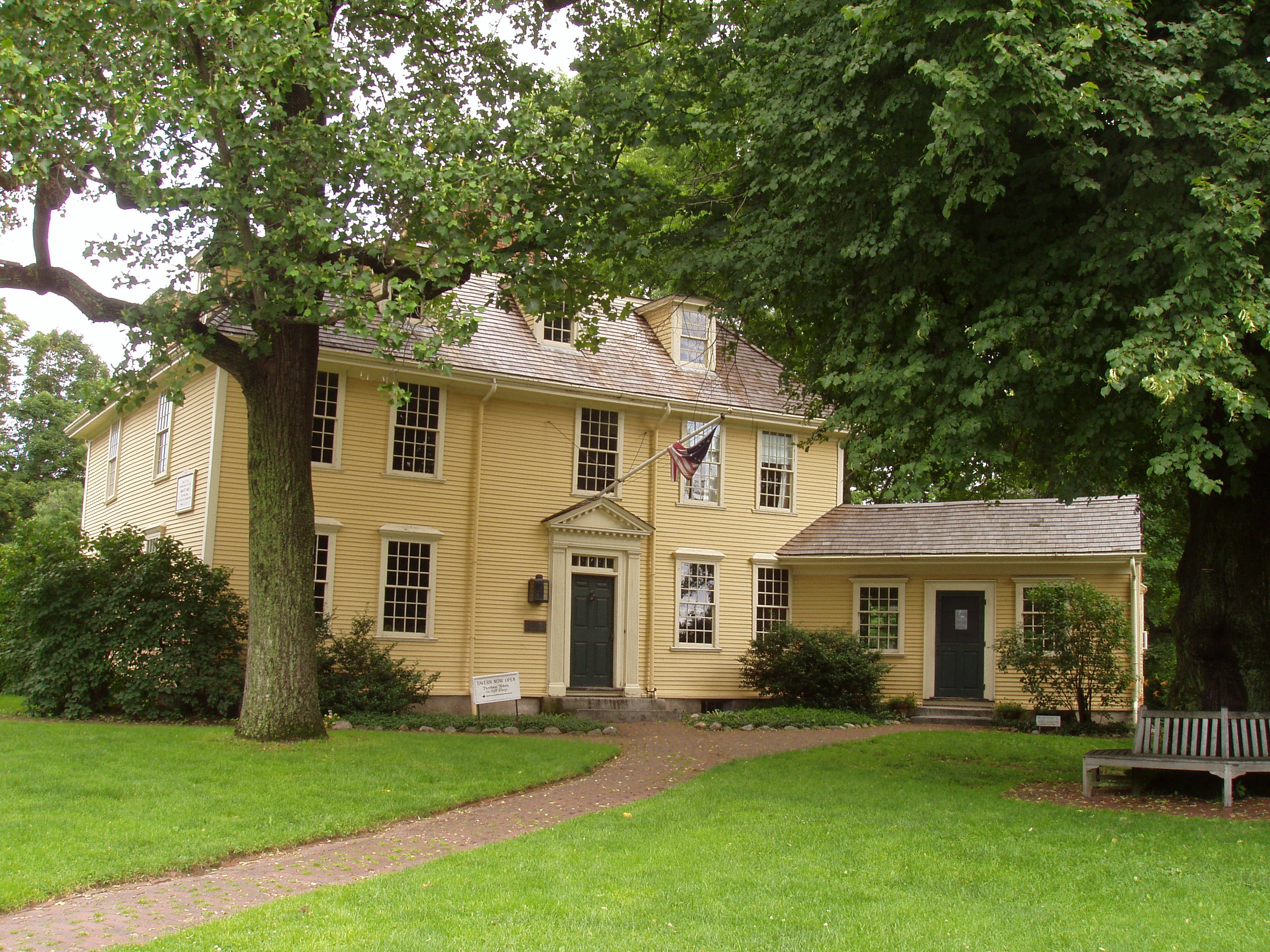
Buckman Tavern in 2005

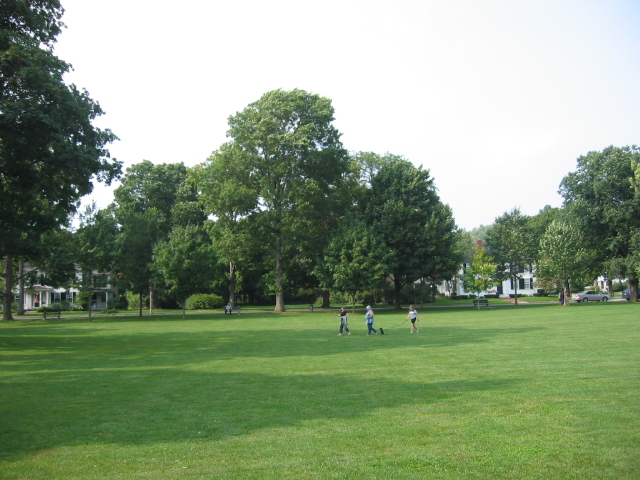
Lexington Battle Green in 2003, looking northwest

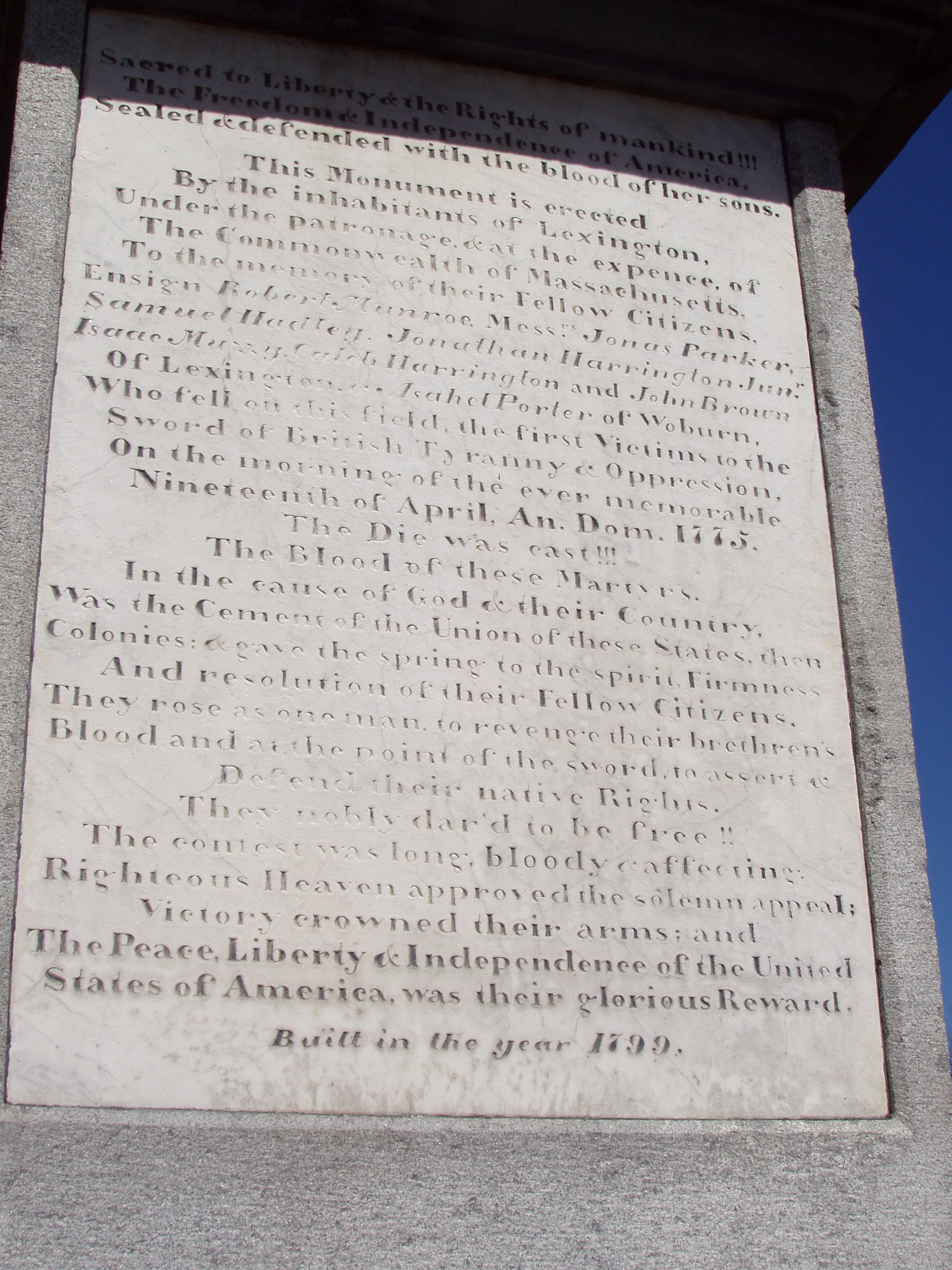
Inscription on the 1799 Revolutionary Monument

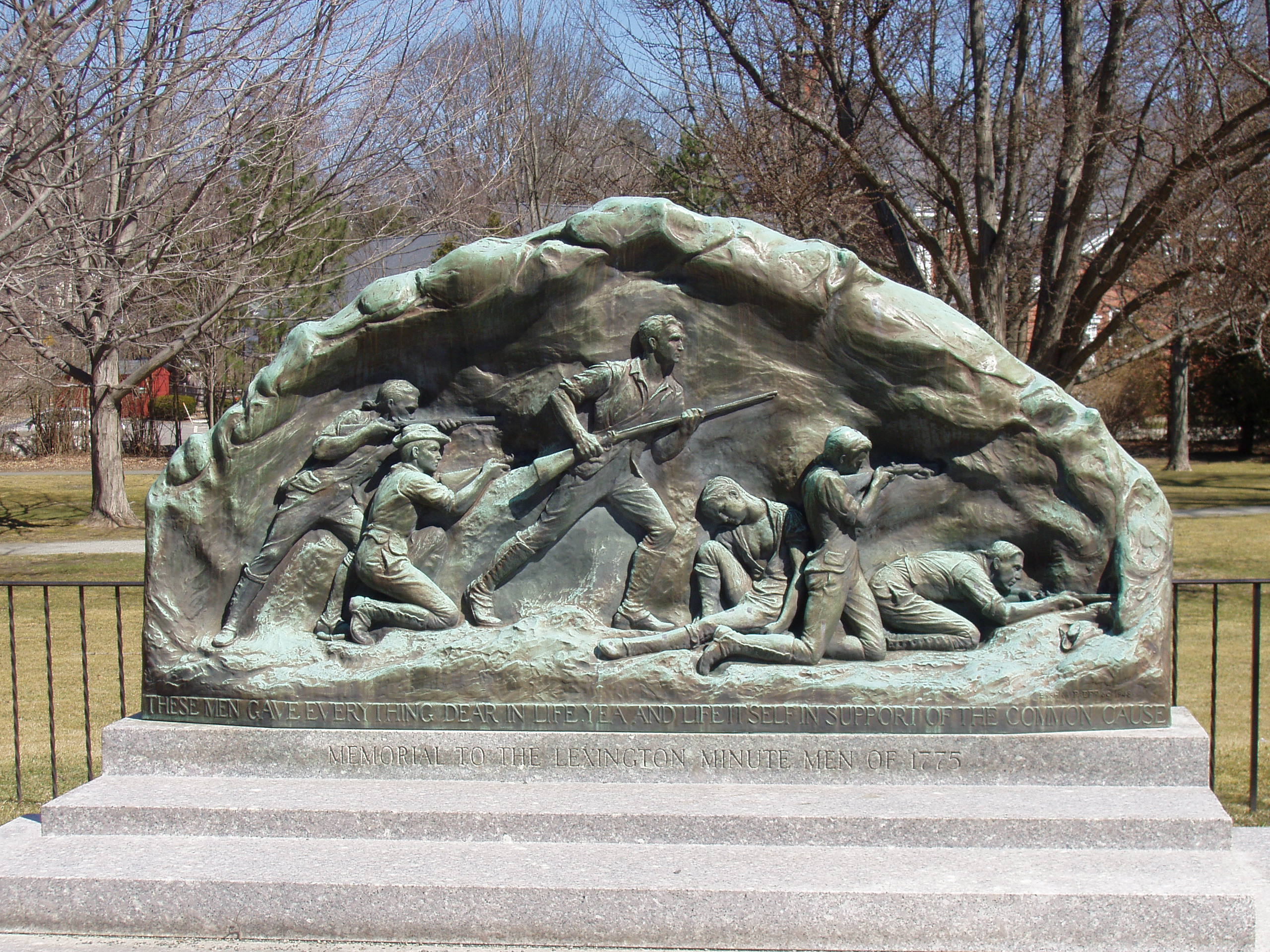
Memorial to the Lexington Minute Men (1948) by B. Paeff

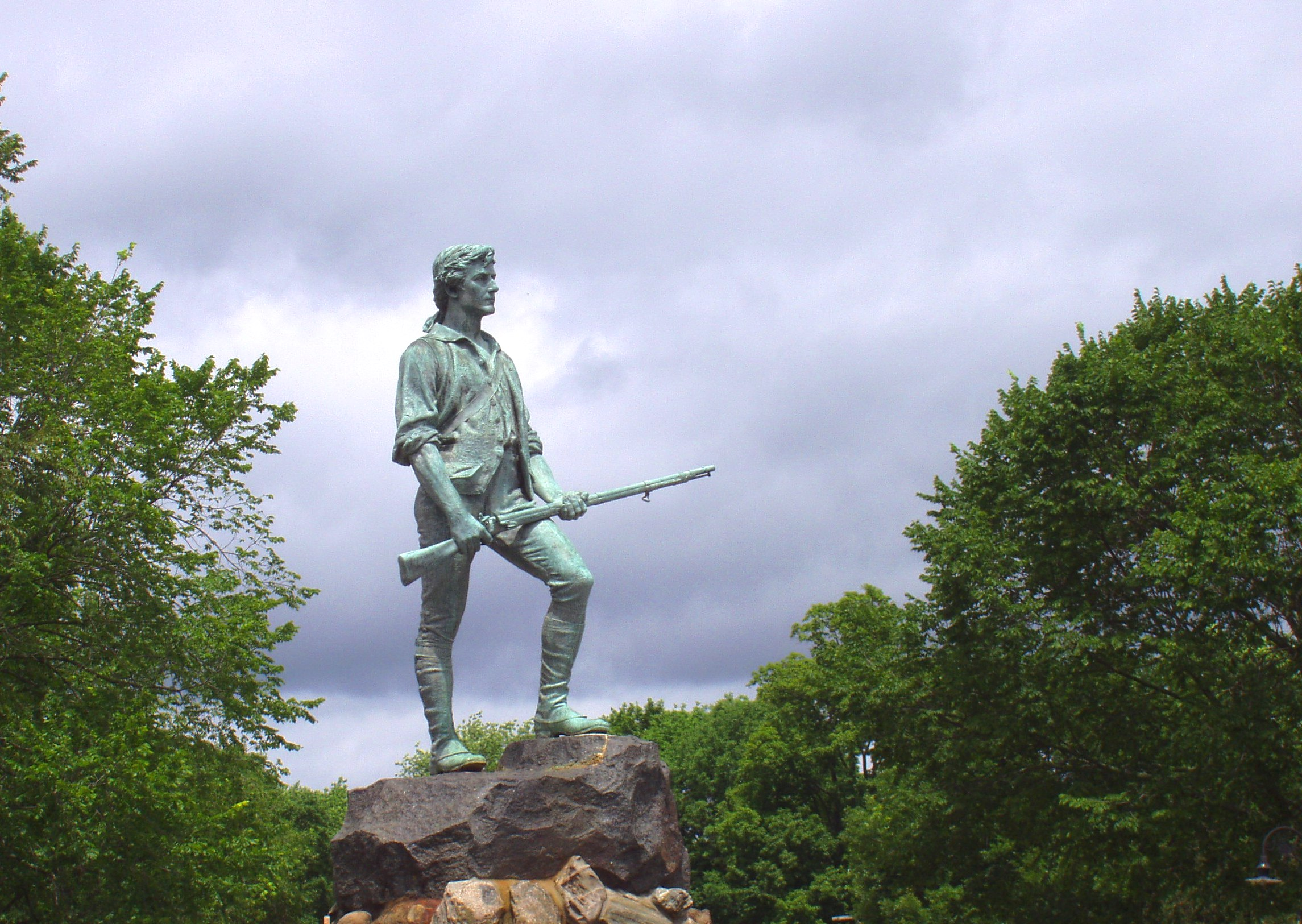
The Minuteman Statue (1899) by H. H. Kitson, a bequest of Francis Brown Hayes to the Town of Lexington

== See also ==
- List of National Historic Landmarks in Massachusetts
- National Register of Historic Places listings in Middlesex County, Massachusetts
- Hancock–Clarke House, another nearby National Historic Landmark
