= Buckman Tavern =

Museum in Lexington, Massachusetts

- U.S. National Register of Historic Places
- U.S. National Historic Landmark
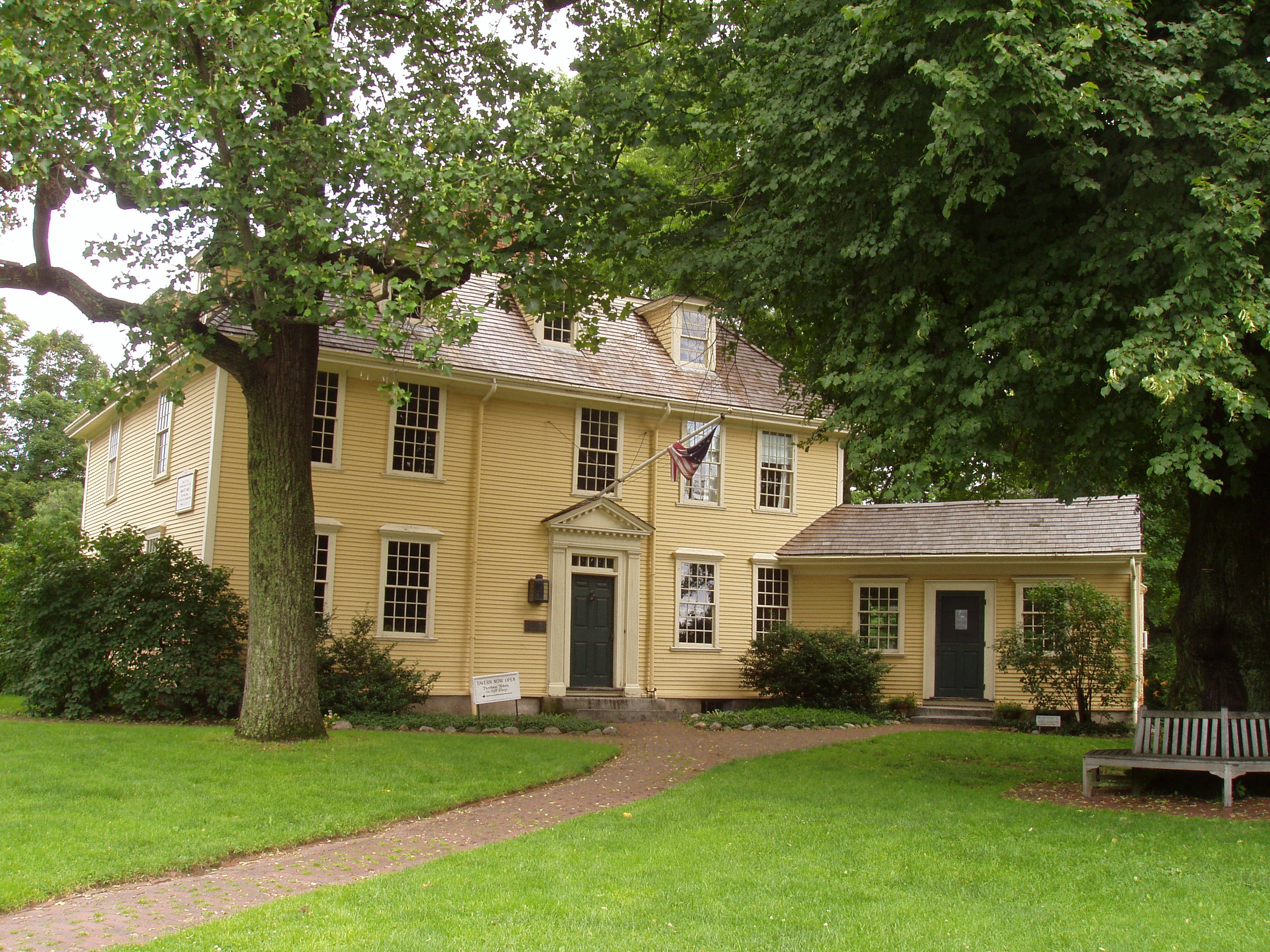
- Buckman Tavern, Lexington, Massachusetts

- Location within Massachusetts Location within the United States
- Location: 1 Bedford Street, Lexington, Massachusetts
- Coordinates: 42.4493°N 71.2297°W
- Built: ca. 1709–1710
- Architect: Benjamin Muzzey
- Architectural style: Federal
- NRHP reference No.: 66000137

Significant dates
- Added to NRHP: October 15, 1966
- Designated NHL: January 20, 1961

Buckman Tavern is a historic American Revolutionary War site associated with the revolution's first battle, the 1775 Battle of Lexington and Concord. It is located on the Battle Green in Lexington, Massachusetts, and operated as a museum by the Lexington Historical Society.

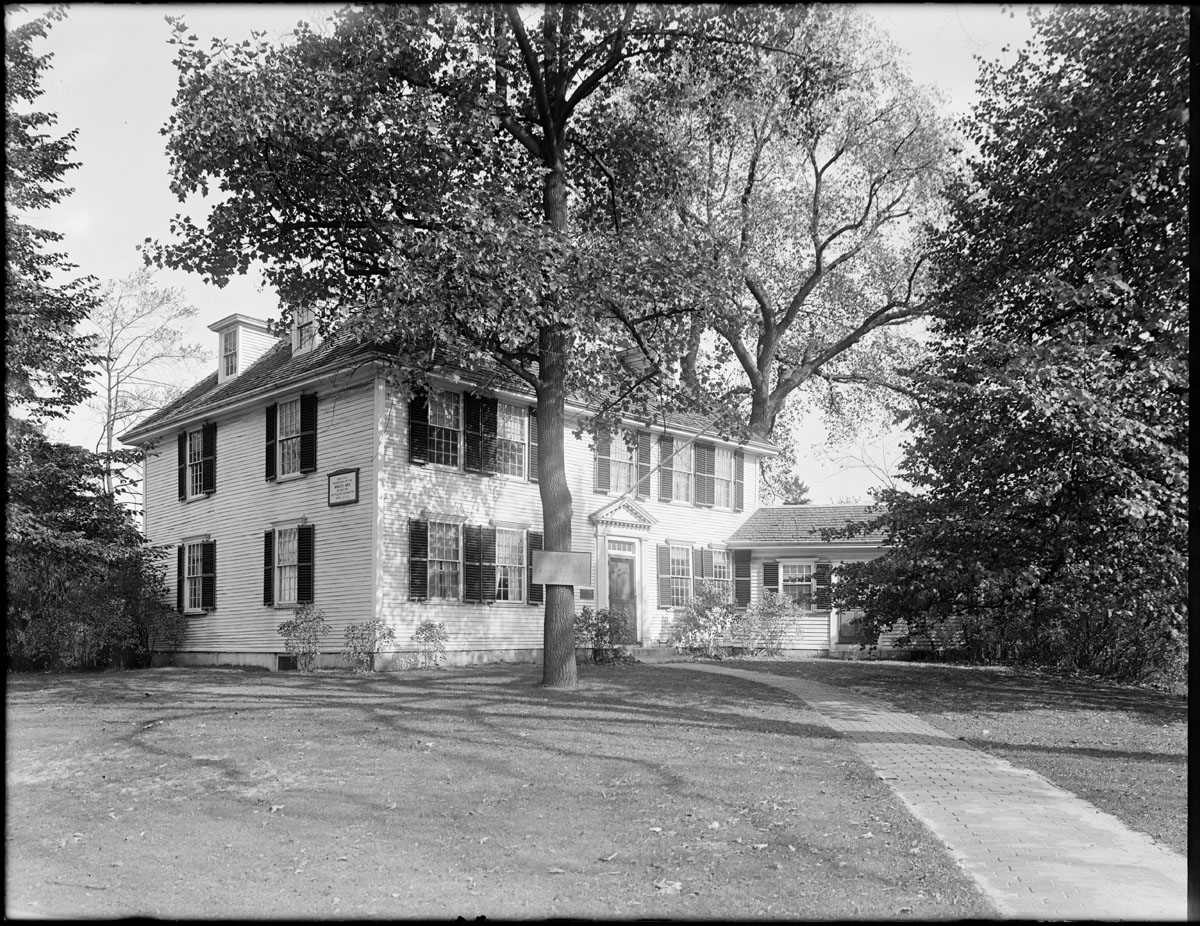
Buckman Tavern in 1929

== History ==
The tavern was built in about 1709–1710 by Benjamin Muzzey (1657–1735), and with license granted in 1693 was the first public house in Lexington. Muzzey ran it for years, then his son John, and then at the time of the battle it was run by John's granddaughter and her husband John Buckman, a member of the Lexington Training Band. In those years the tavern was a favorite gathering place for militiamen on days when they trained on the Lexington Green. Lexington, unlike other local communities, did not establish a minuteman company, instead maintaining a training band for local defense.

=== Battles of Lexington and Concord ===
The Battle of Lexington and Concord took form before dawn on April 19, 1775. Having received word that the regular army had left Boston in force to seize and destroy military supplies in Concord, several dozen militiamen gathered on the town common, and then eventually went to the tavern to await the arrival of the British troops. Definite word reached them just before sunrise, and Captain Parker's company of militia left the tavern to assemble in two ranks on the common. Following the arrival of the army, a single shot was fired; by whom, it is still unknown. With this shot, the American Revolutionary War began.

Although best known as the headquarters of the militia, Buckman Tavern is also noteworthy as perhaps the busiest of Lexington's 18th-century taverns. It housed the first village store in Lexington, and later, in 1813, the first town post office.

== Historic site ==
The tavern's interior appears today very much as it did in 1775 and one can see the restored 18th-century taproom with large fireplace and central chimney. Among the many items on display is the old front door, with its bullet hole possibly made by a British musket ball during the battle, and a portrait of John Buckman.

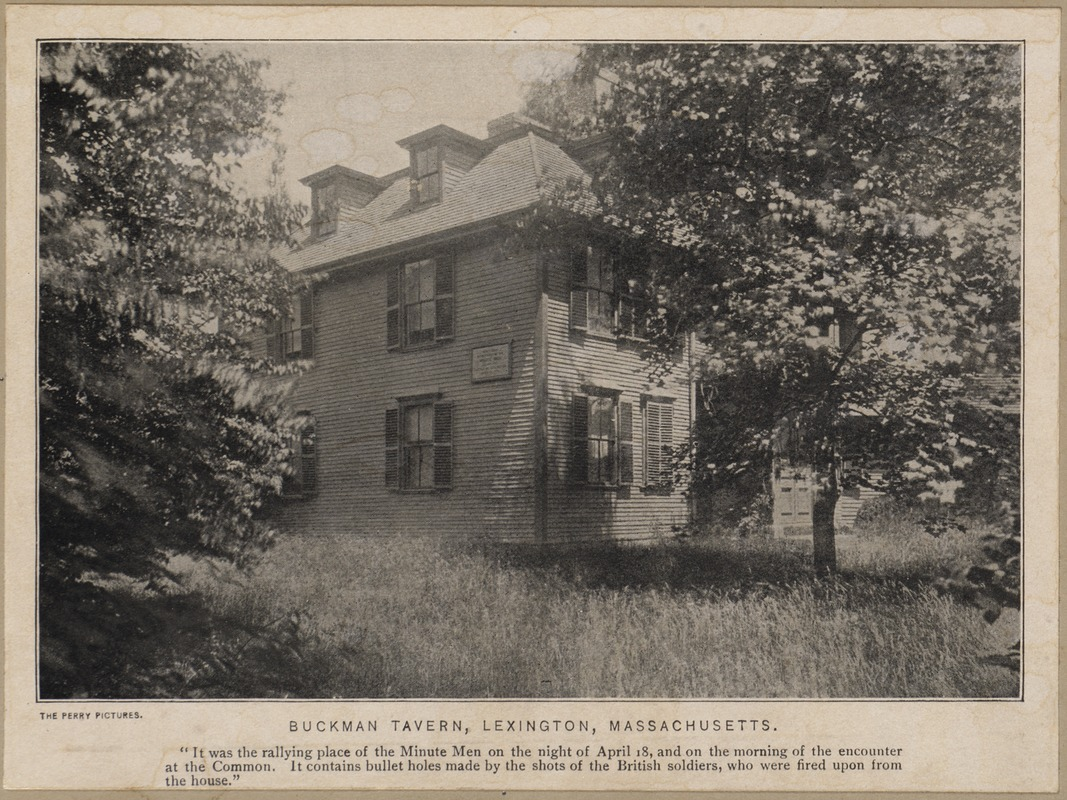
Buckman Tavern, Lexington, Massachusetts, ca. 1895-1905. Archive of Photographic Documentation of Early Massachusetts Architecture, Boston Public Library.

It was declared a National Historic Landmark in 1961.

== See also ==
- Munroe Tavern (Lexington, Massachusetts)
- List of National Historic Landmarks in Massachusetts
- National Register of Historic Places listings in Middlesex County, Massachusetts
