= Farwell Jones House =

Colonial building in Massachusetts

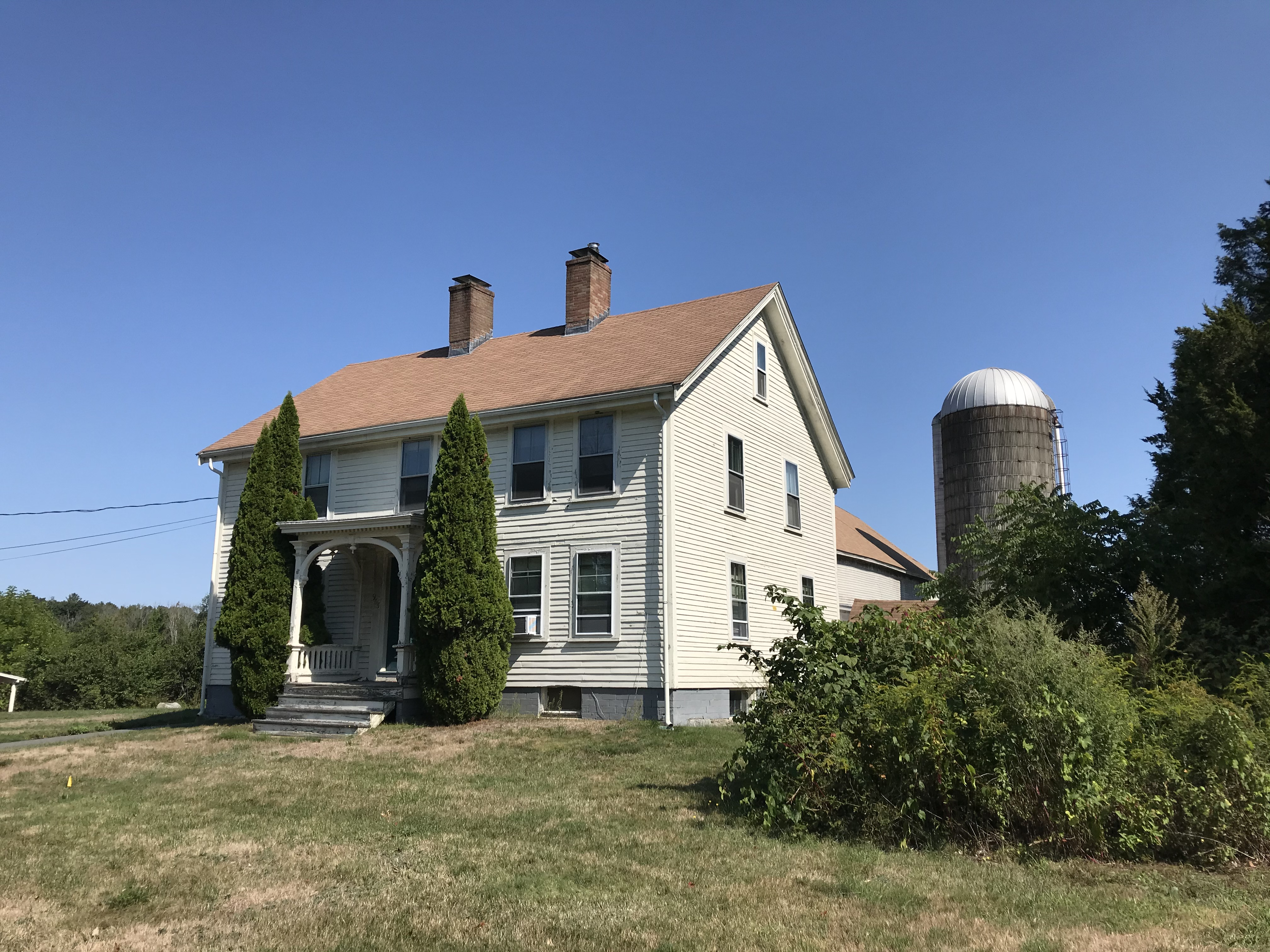
- Farwell Jones House
- Interactive map of the Farwell Jones House area

General information
- Location: Concord, Massachusetts, Lexington Road
- Coordinates: 42.45633°N 71.31554°W
- Completed: Early 18th century

Technical details
- Floor count: 3 (including basement)

The Farwell Jones House is a historic American Revolutionary War site associated with the revolution's first battle, the 1775 battles of Lexington and Concord. Built in the early 18th century, it stands on Lexington Road in Concord, Massachusetts, just southwest of the former Battle Road. It is one of eleven houses within the Minute Man National Historic Park that still exists today.

== History ==
The building first appeared in records in 1716, when John Jones, father of Farwell, established a farm there. Farwell took over the farm around 1760, a couple of years before his father's death. At the time of the battles of Lexington and Concord, his sister, Olive Stow, and her two children lived in the adjacent property to the east, now known as the Stow-Hardy House.

Farwell Jones married Hannah Hosmer in 1777. They had one child - a daughter, Hannah. Hannah inherited the house in 1802, with its title transferring to her husband, Calvin Wright. Wright died in 1803, and the property was split between their two children.

The home left the Jones family in 1838, from which point it had four owners prior to its sale to James Carty in 1891. Carty sold the farm to George Williams in 1907.

Aleck and Anna Norwalk owned it when the Minute Man National Historic Park was created in 1959. Eminent domain meant the government was authorized to take ownership of all of the land within the park, although this property was not transferred until 1976. After the death of her husband, Anna was paid $400,000 for the property, but was allowed to live in the house, with her children, for the next 25 years. She died in 1994, and seven years later the National Park Service took over the property.

The barn on the property was built in 1903.

=== Battles of Lexington and Concord ===
The battles of Lexington and Concord took form before dawn on April 19, 1775. Soldiers passed north of the house on their way to Concord, and again on their way back to Boston.
