= Ephraim Flint =

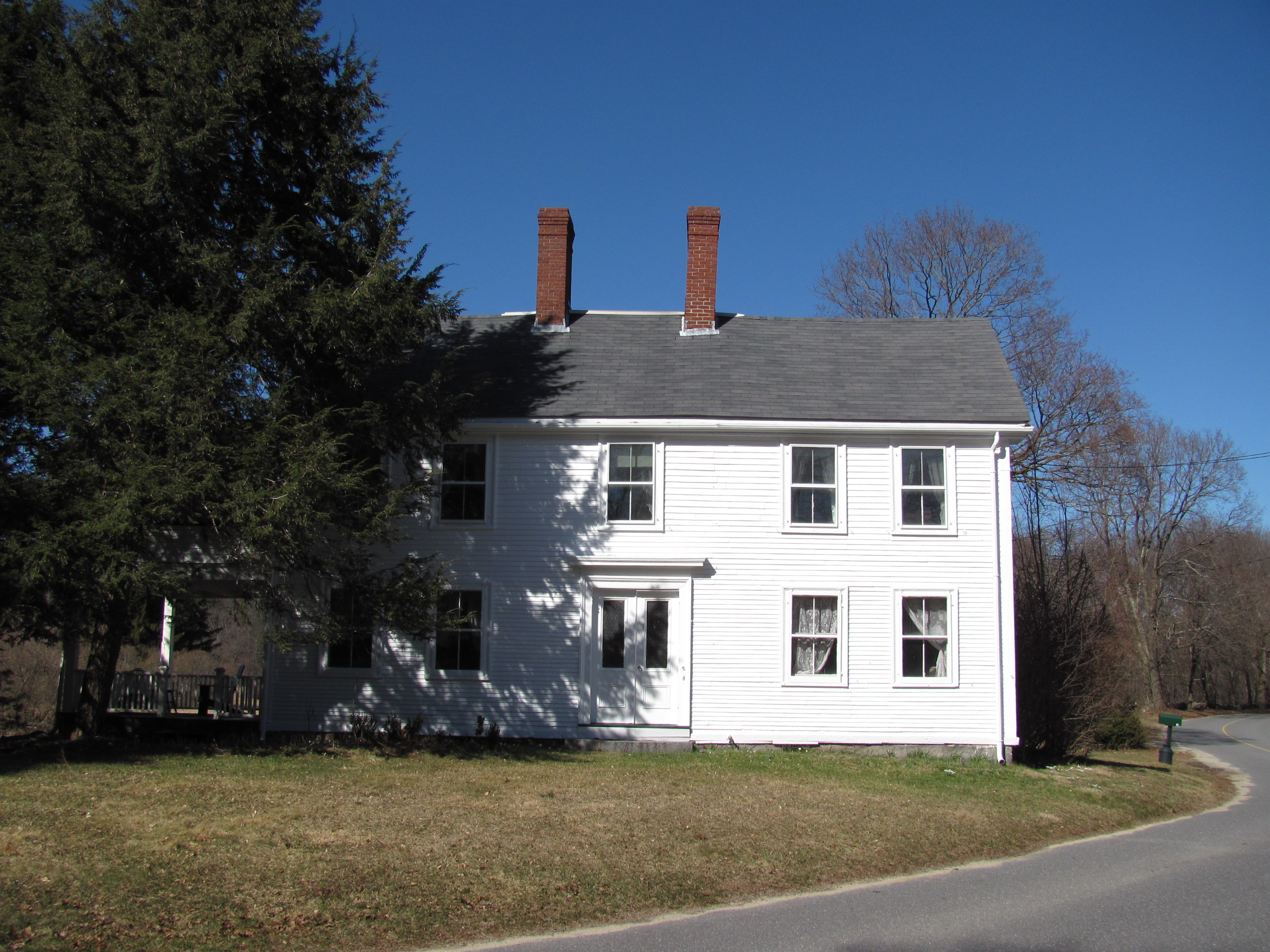
- Flint House, Lincoln, Massachusetts
- Born: March 4, 1714; Concord, Province of Massachusetts Bay
- Died: December 6, 1762 (aged 48); Lincoln, Province of Massachusetts Bay
- Spouse: Ruth Wheeler (1743–1762; his death)

Ephraim Flint (March 4, 1714 – December 6, 1762) was one of the founders of today's Lincoln, Massachusetts, in 1754.

== Early life ==
Flint was born in Concord, Province of Massachusetts Bay, to Colonel John Flint and Abigail Butterick. His great-grandfather was Hon. Thomas Flint, who emigrated from Matlock, England, to Concord in 1638. His paternal grandfather, John Flint Sr., was a prominent citizen of Concord.

Flint settled in Concord, part of which he helped re-settle as Lincoln, Province of Massachusetts Bay, in 1754. He had earlier inherited the land of his uncle, Edward (b. 1685), and great-uncle, Ephraim, who lived at Flint House.

He graduated from Harvard College in 1733.

== Personal life ==
Flint married Ruth Wheeler, daughter of Thomas Wheeler and Mary Monroe. One of their children was Mary Hartwell (1747–1846), who became noted for her assistance to the local militia during the early stages of the battles of Lexington and Concord.

The family lived at the Flint House, which was built by Flint's great-uncle, also named Ephraim, in 1708 and still stands on Lexington Road in Lincoln.

== Death ==
Flint died in 1762, aged 48. He was interred in Lincoln's Precinct Burial Ground (also known as Lincoln Cemetery). His widow remarried, to Captain Bradwell Smith, and lived until the age of 82.
