= Milldam =

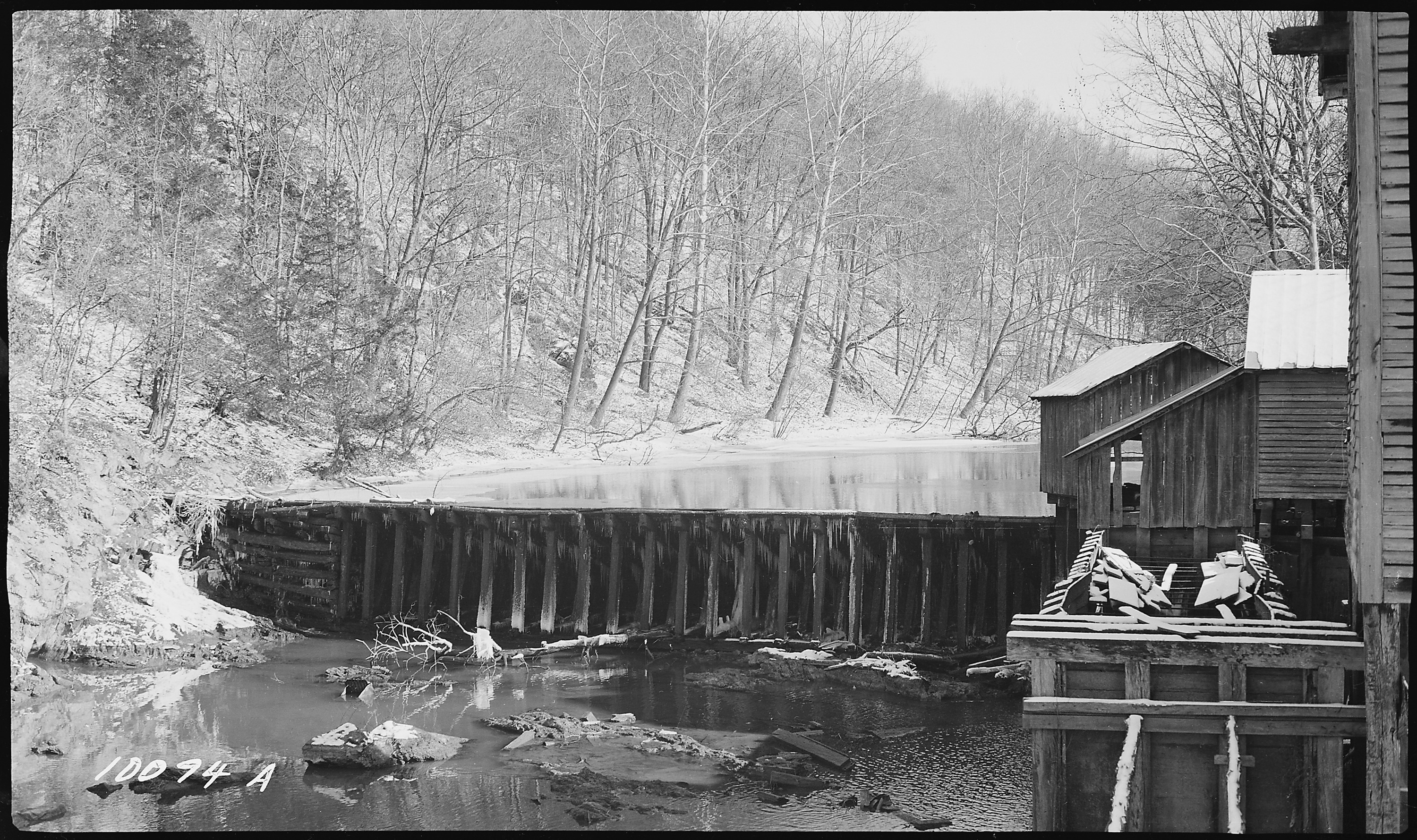
Mountain Carmel Mill Dam

A mill dam (International English) or milldam (US) is a dam constructed on a waterway to create a mill pond.

Water passing through a dam's spillway is used to turn a water wheel and provide energy to the many varieties of watermill. By raising the water level so that the overflow has farther to fall, a milldam increases the potential energy that a mill can harness and use for various tasks.

== Examples ==
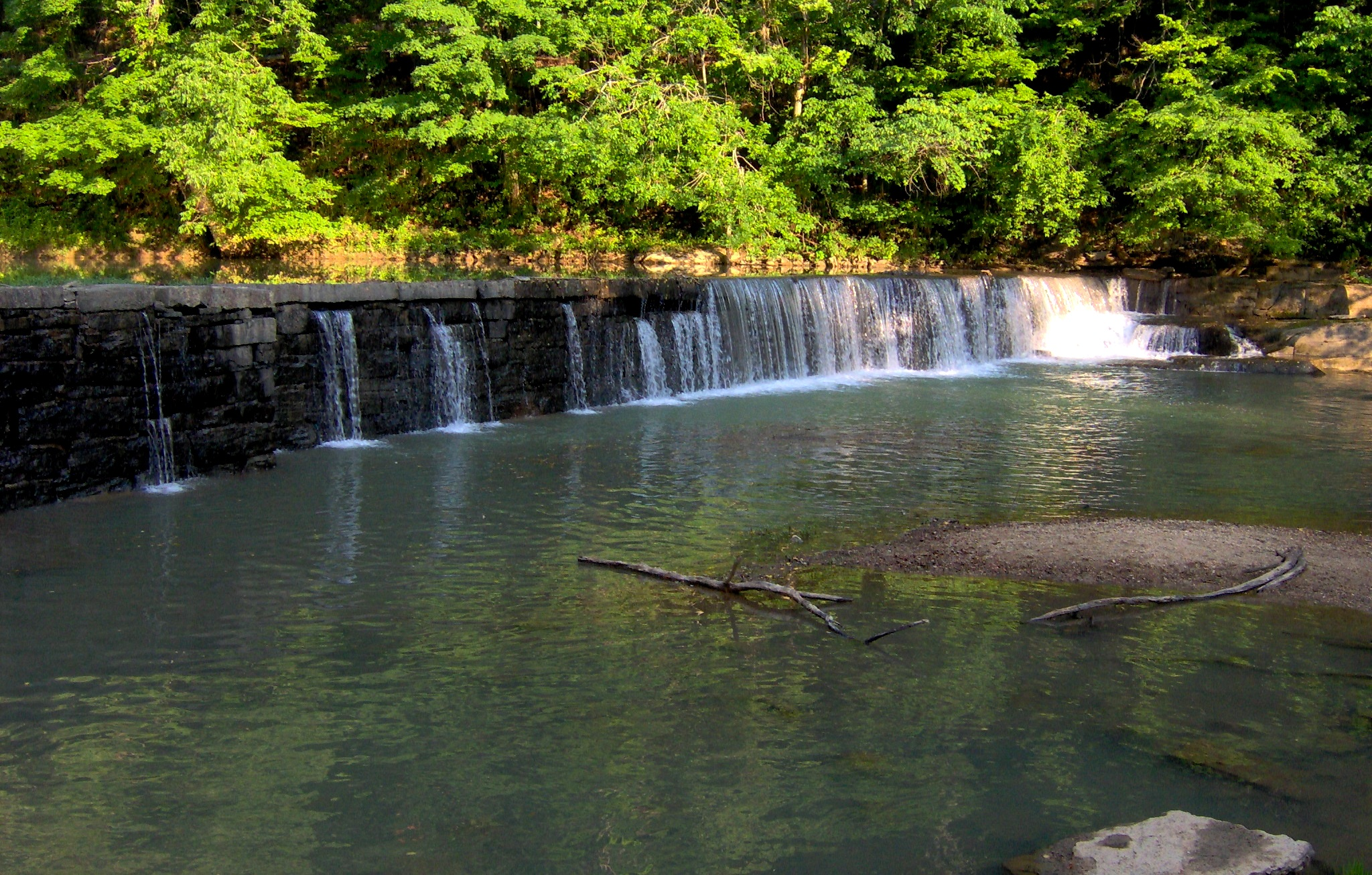
Milldam along the Wolf River at Sgt. Alvin C. York State Historic Park

Listed are here are some of the many examples of historic milldams and millponds (or place names taken from them).

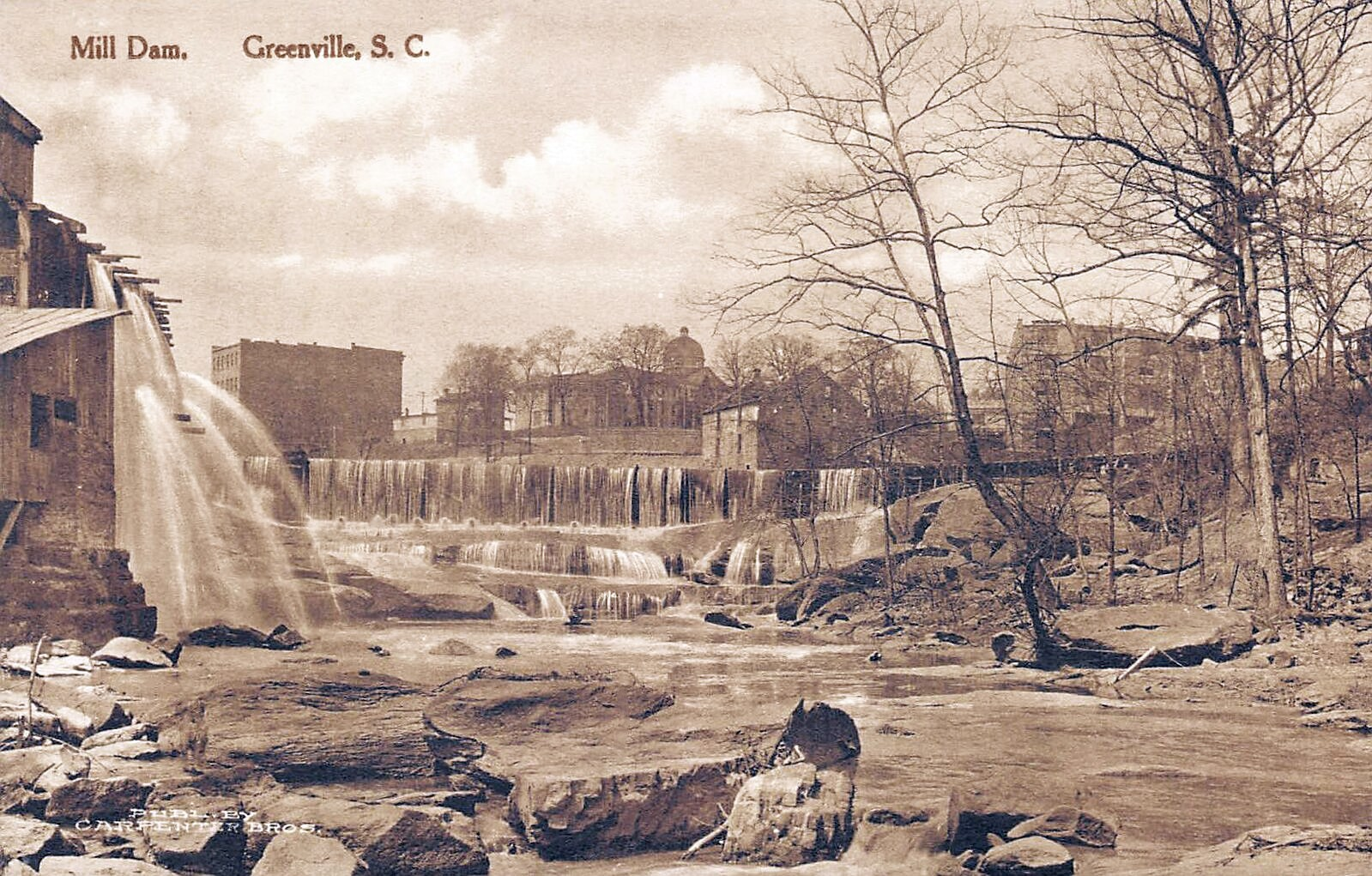
Mill dam in Greenville

=== Examples in the United Kingdom include ===
- Bramley Millpond in Bramley, Surrey
- Ifield Millpond in Ifield, West Sussex
- Valebridge Millpond on the outskirts of Burgess Hill, West Sussex
- Mill Dam, Shapinsay in the Orkney Islands

=== Examples in the United States include ===
- Milldam Rice Mill and Rice Barn in Georgetown County, South Carolina
- Atwater Millpond in Kalamazoo County, Michigan
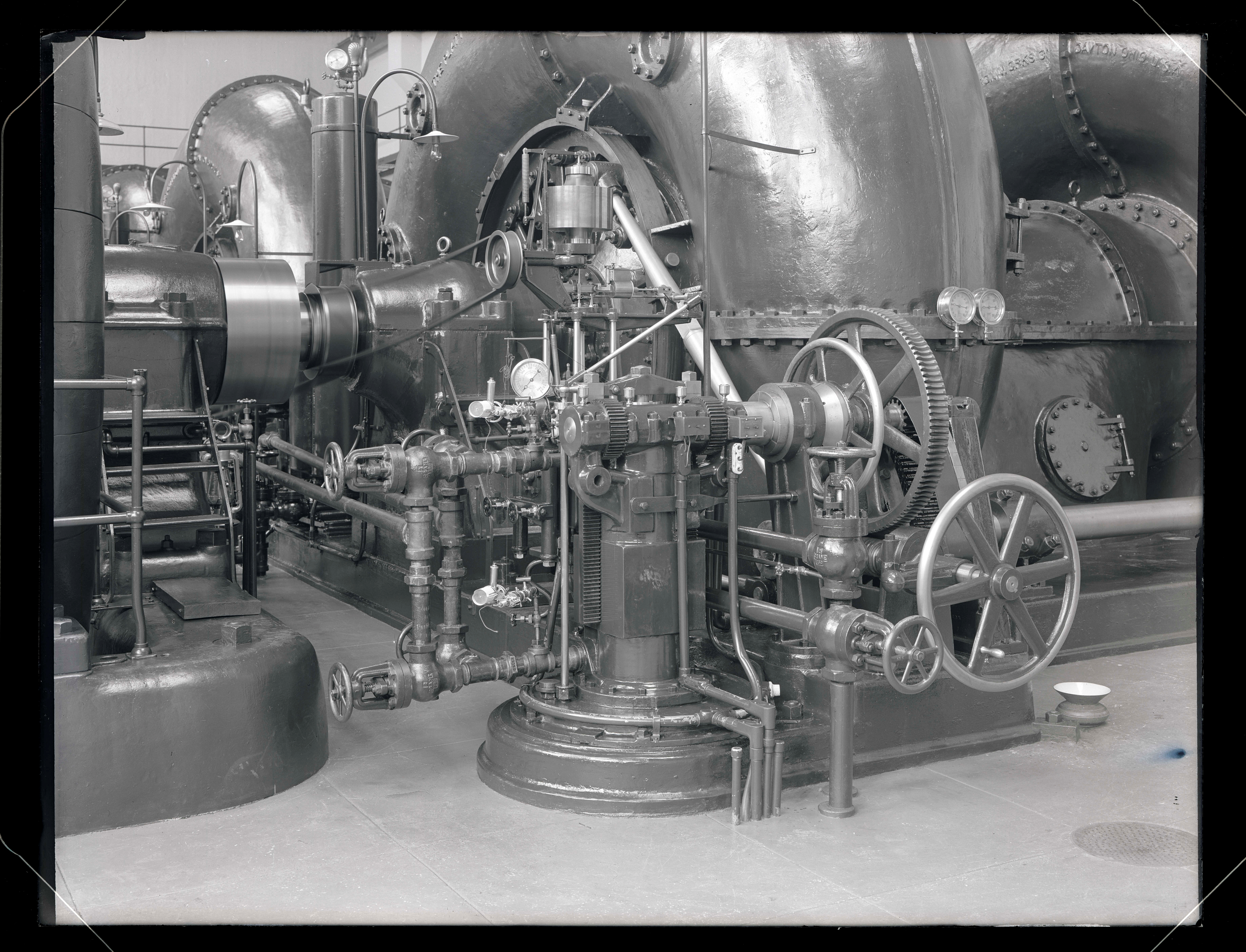
- Governor for a river mill dam
  Ballardvale Millpond in Ballardvale, Massachusetts
- Bigler's Millpond in Bigler's Mill, Virginia
- Crump's Millpond in Quinton, Virginia
- Gardy's Millpond in Westmoreland and Northumberland County, Virginia
- Glovers Millpond in Glascock County, Georgia
- Goodrich Millpond in Genesee County, Michigan
- Goodwin's Millpond in Marlboro County, South Carolina
- Hands Millpond in Cape May County, New Jersey
- Merchants Millpond State Park in Gates County, North Carolina
- Milldam, Concord, Massachusetts
- Millpond, a small lake in Butler, New York
- Millpond Acres in Sussex County, Delaware
- Millpond Park in Mount Pleasant, Michigan
- Millpond Plantation in Thomas County, Georgia
- Millpond Reservoir in Burlington, Massachusetts
