= James DeNormandie =

American preservationist

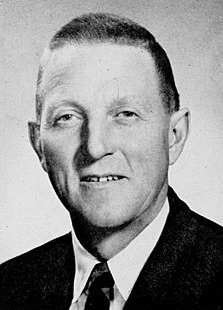
- DeNormandie in 1967
- Born: November 10, 1907; Boston, Massachusetts, U.S.
- Died: December 23, 1987 (aged 80); Boston, Massachusetts, U.S.
- Resting place: Arborvitae Cemetery, Lincoln, Massachusetts, U.S.
- Occupation: Preservationist
- Spouse: Martha Boyd Prouty (m. 1943–1987; his death)

James DeNormandie (November 10, 1907 – December 23, 1987) was a Republican state senator and state representative from Massachusetts.

== Early life ==
DeNormandie was born in 1907 in Boston, Massachusetts, United States. His father was Dr. James DeNormandie. DeNormandie Jr. attended Boston Academy of the Sacred Heart, and was a graduate of Harvard College and Harvard Law School.

== Career ==
DeNormandie served as a state representative between 1955 and 1964 and as a state senator from 1965 to 1972. It was during his years as a legislator that he lobbied for land preservation. This led to the conservation of Walden Pond and, in 1959, the establishment of the Minute Man National Historic Park and the Cape Cod National Seashore two years later.

He was also a co-founder of the Lincoln Conservation Commission, the Lincoln Rural Land Foundation and chairman of Lincoln Cemetery Commission.

== Personal life ==
In the 1940s, DeNormandie acquired much of the land around Mount Misery, in Lincoln, to prevent it from being developed and for his own agriculture uses. He dammed Beaver Dam Brook and excavated soil to form the lower pond, as well as re-damming the original upper mill pond, and he built a cabin on the top of Mount Misery which later burned. DeNormandie sold Mount Misery to the town as public conservation land in 1969. The land contains Beaver Dam Brook, which is still home to several beavers, and Terrapin Lake, a kettle hole, where cranberries were grown until the 1990s.

DeNormandie married Martha Boyd Prouty, of Spencer, Massachusetts, in 1943. They had three daughters and three sons.

He owned a dairy farm in Lincoln which he expanded via a partnership with Floyd Verrill of nearby Concord. Together, they established The Dairy ice-cream parlor. DeNormandie's farm—and herd of Guernsey cattle—were destroyed by fire in 1954.

He was the founder and first president of the Massachusetts Association for Artificial Insemination, and was involved with several other livestock-related affiliates.

A Unitarian, he was involved in joining Lincoln's Unitarian and Congregational Churches to form the First Parish Church. He was also involved in preserving the First Church in Roxbury, at which his grandfather had been minister.

== Death ==
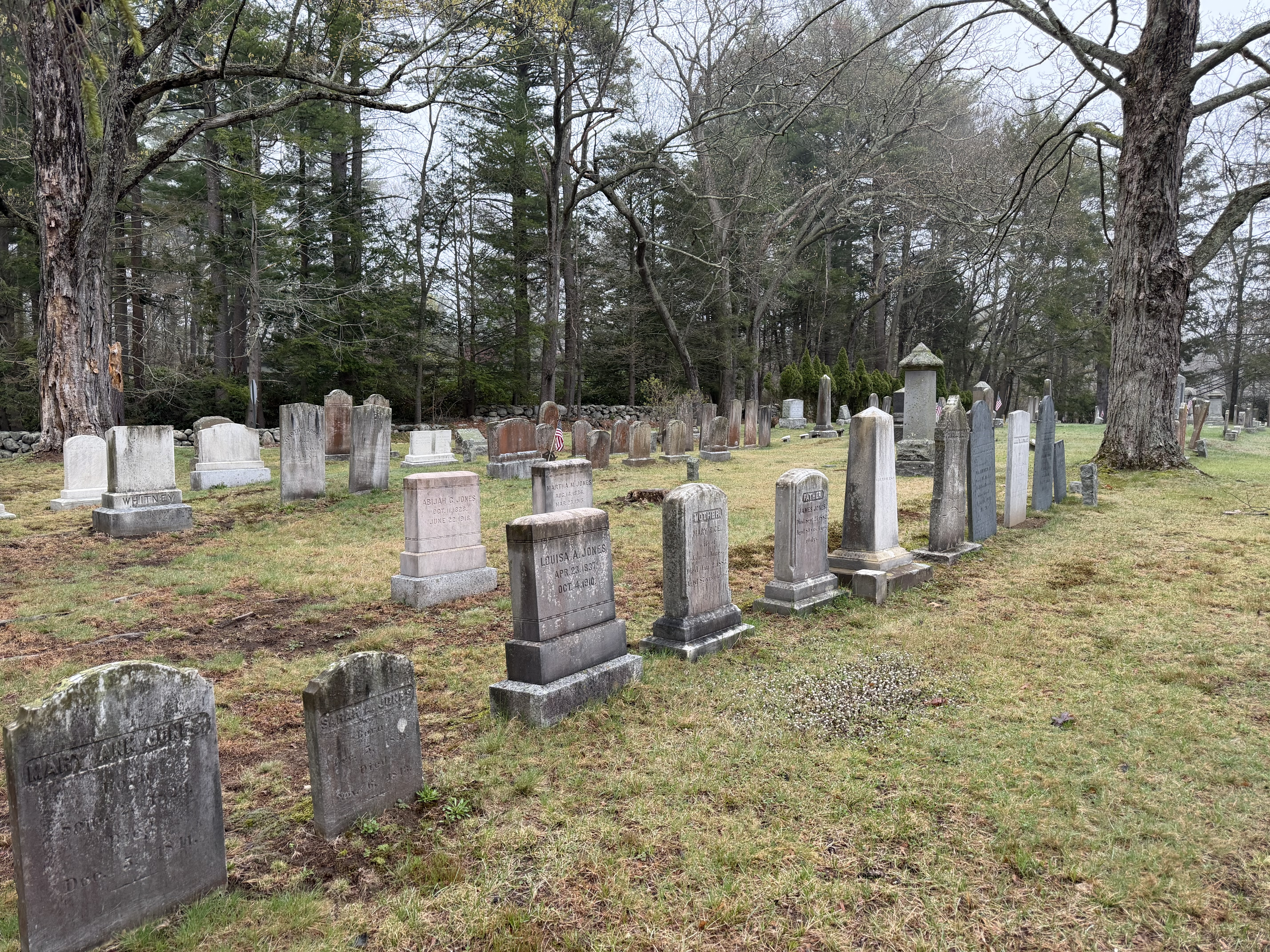
Arborvitae Cemetery in Lincoln, Massachusetts, DeNormandie's resting place

DeNormandie died in 1987 while at Boston's Massachusetts General Hospital for a heart ailment. Aged 80, he had been living in Lincoln. His widow survived him by 23 years and was interred beside him in Arborvitae Cemetery in Lincoln.
