= Chambers Russell =

American judge (1713–1766)

Chambers Russell (1713–1766) was a lawyer and judge from the Province of Massachusetts Bay. Born in Charlestown, he completed a degree at Harvard College in 1731, read law with John Reed, and settled in Concord. He was a leading force in the incorporation of Lincoln from parts of Concord and other towns, and was given the honor of naming the new town (which he did in honor of the ancestral home of Lincolnshire). His home, now known as the Codman House, still stands.

He represented Lincoln in the provincial assembly for eight years. He was an associate justice of the Massachusetts Superior Court of Judicature from 1752 to 1766, and a judge of the Crown admiralty court covering Massachusetts, Rhode Island, and New Hampshire from 1747 until 1766. In the latter role Russell was disliked by New England merchants for his rulings concerning ships seized for actions of their owners that violated the Navigation Acts and were deemed to be smuggling.

He died in Guildford, Surrey after a brief illness.

Legal offices
Preceded by Stephen Sewall	Justice of the Massachusetts Superior Court of Judicature; 1752–1766	Succeeded by Edmund Trowbridge
