= McCune Site =

- U.S. National Register of Historic Places
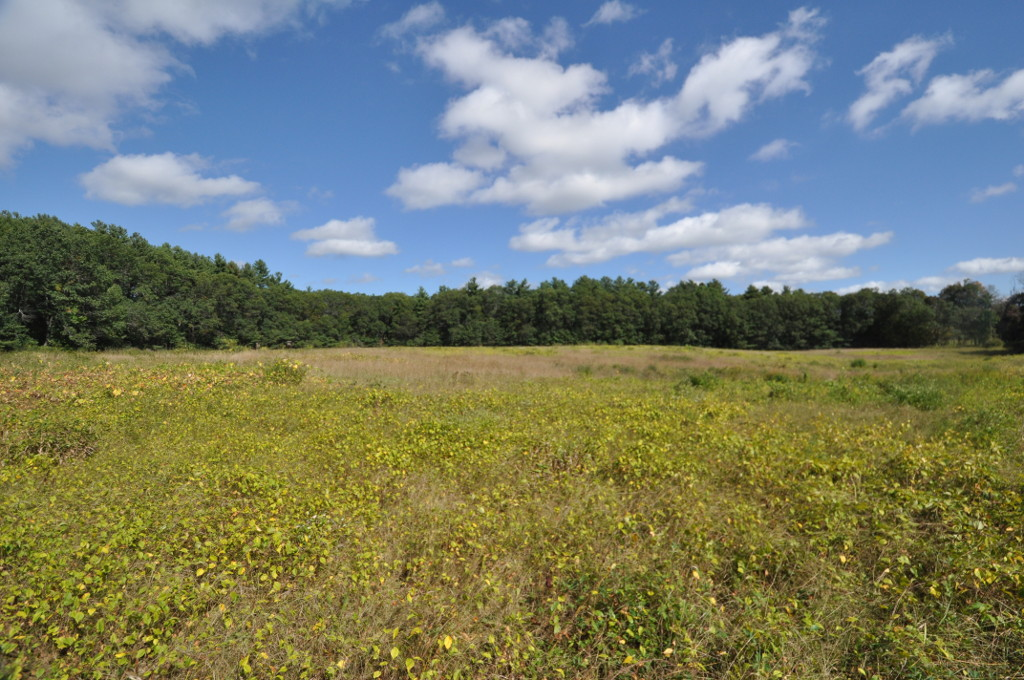
- Nearest city: Lincoln, Massachusetts
- Area: 16.5 acres (6.7 ha)
- NRHP reference No.: 86000115
- Added to NRHP: January 23, 1986

The McCune Site is a historic archaeological site in Lincoln, Massachusetts. It is the site of a prehistoric Early Archaic Susquehanna culture (c. 5,000 to 3,000 BC) settlement, and is particularly significant as this is one of the only such sites in eastern New England that has no components from other time periods. Heather McCune discovered the site in 1980, on farmland leased from the state. The state archaeologist was informed, and an archaeological survey was conducted a year later. The site was listed on the National Register of Historic Places in 1986.

Knowledge of the Susquehanna tradition Natives during the Archaic Period in Massachusetts is limited. Only a small number of sites have been found in the state; of those in the eastern portion, the two that were found before the McCune site were associated with funerary activities. It is unclear if the evidence that has been found of the Susquehanna in the area is the result of the movement of small bands into the area, or if it was part of a trade network with other Native cultures already resident there. As a distinctively Susquehanna site, evidence from the McCune site should be able to shed some light on this question.

The site consists of a partially open, partially wooded area of about 16.5 acres (6.7 ha), which is owned by the state. The open portion of the site is an agricultural field that had lain fallow for some time before the state leased it to a farmer. Plowing of the field turned up archaeologically interesting materials, and the state spent several days surveying the site to determine its bounds and gather surface samples. Large amounts of chipping debris (from the fabrication of stone tools) were found, as were three tools, all of Susquehanna tradition manufacture: a portion of a blade, a point tip, and a biface (stone hand axe). Charcoal and small quantities of red ochre were also recovered. Despite instructions not to, the field was again plowed in 1982; this action is not thought to have compromised the integrity of the site.

== See also ==
- National Register of Historic Places listings in Middlesex County, Massachusetts
