= Beaver Pond (Massachusetts) =

Body of water in Lincoln, Massachusetts, United States

- Location within Massachusetts Location within the United States
- Location: Middlesex County, Massachusetts
- Coordinates: 42.41552°N 71.30485°W
- Primary outflows: Stony Brook
- Basin countries: United States
- Surface area: 20 acres (8.1 ha)
- Settlements: Lincoln, Massachusetts

Beaver Pond is a body of water in Lincoln, Massachusetts, United States. Today it is part of a conservation area, owned by Lincoln Land Conservation Trust (LLCT), containing ponds, wetlands, forests and meadows. Historically, the land was used for farming. The wetlands were dammed so that hay could be harvested, while the upland areas were used for pasture.

In the 17th century, Thomas Flint received a grant of 750 acres (300 ha), extending from Flints Pond to Beaver Pond.

The land was given to LLCT by Jean Wood Preston.

In 2004, the Library of Congress Subject Headings listed Beaver Pond is used for Wheeler Pond.

The pond itself, located around 2.42 miles (3.89 km) southeast of Walden Pond, is around 20 acres (8.1 ha) in area. Its outlet, around 1 mile (1.6 km) long, flows southward into Stony Brook, a tributary of the Charles River.

Beaver Pond Road, a loop off of Tower Road, is located just to the northwest of the Beaver Pond.
