= Verrill Farm =

Farm in Concord, Massachusetts, United States

- Location within Massachusetts
- Town/City: Concord
- State: Massachusetts
- Country: United States
- Coordinates: 42.42462°N 71.37421°W
- Established: 1918 (108 years ago)
- Area: 200 acres (81 ha)
- Status: Open to the public

Verrill Farm is a farm on Wheeler Road in Concord, Massachusetts, United States. Established by Floyd and Amy Verrill in 1918, its 200 acres (81 ha) of land dates back to colonial America. It is known for its rows of sunflowers. Its farmhouse was built in 1840.

The Verrills founded The Dairy, an ice-cream parlor, in partnership with James DeNormandie of nearby Lincoln. DeNormandie's Guernsey cattle provided their milk until his farm and herd were destroyed by fire in 1954. Floyd Verrill began building pastures of clover, timothy-grass, bluegrass and alfalfa in 1929. The following year, he had around 100 cows.

The farm began hosting an annual Harvest Festival in 2006. Its proceeds benefit Emerson Hospital in Concord.

In 1982, the farms land was placed under an Agricultural Preservation Restriction, which prevented development from occurring.

Steve Verrill, grandson of the original owner, took over the farm in 1957, upon his graduation from Cornell University. He sold the farm's dairy herd in 1990.

Jennifer Verrill, Steve's daughter, and her husband, Tim, now own the farm. Their daughters are the fourth generation of the family to work on the farm.

Its farmstand was rebuilt after a fire in 2008.
