= Noah Brooks Tavern =

Colonial building in Massachusetts

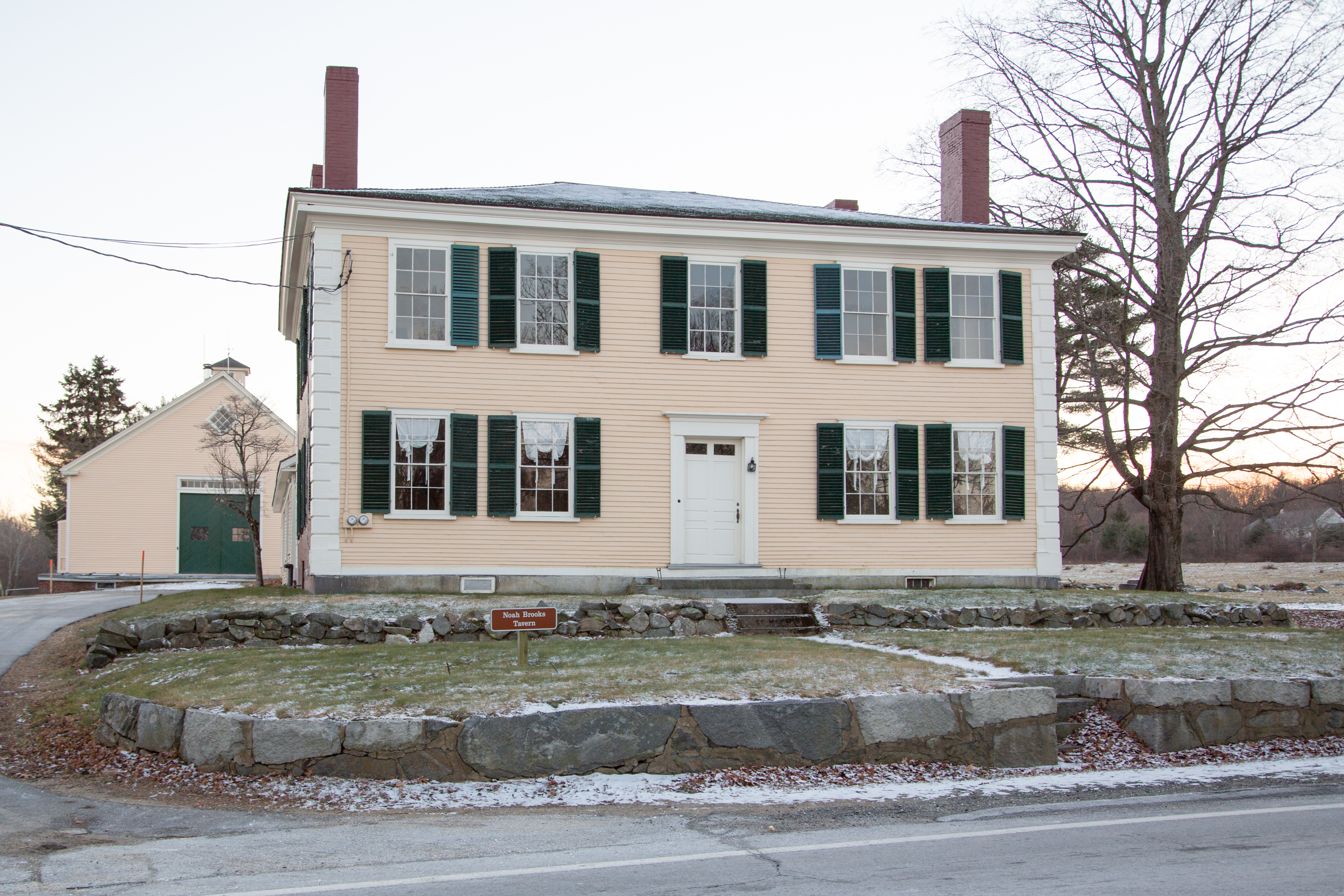
- The property in 2012
- Interactive map of the Noah Brooks Tavern area

General information
- Location: Lincoln, Massachusetts, North Great Road
- Coordinates: 42.452737°N 71.30696°W
- Completed: c. 1790 (236 years ago)

Technical details
- Floor count: 2

The Noah Brooks Tavern is a historic American Revolutionary War site associated with the revolution's first battle, the 1775 battles of Lexington and Concord. It stands, on the site of a previous home, on North Great Road in Lincoln, Massachusetts, just south of the former Battle Road, in an area known as Brooks Village. It is one of eleven houses within the Minute Man National Historic Park that still exists today.

== History ==
The original home was inherited by Thomas Brooks from his father Noah Sr. around 1726. It was on ten acres, and included a barn.

The tavern building that stands on the site today was built in the 1790s by Noah Jr., Thomas' grandson.

The tavern passed through different owners until it ceased functioning in the 1830s. It was sold to Samuel Hartwell in 1857.

=== Battles of Lexington and Concord ===
The battles of Lexington and Concord took form before dawn on April 19, 1775. Soldiers passed north of the house on their way to Concord, and again on their way back to Boston.

The army of the King marched up in fine order and their bayonets glistened in the sunlight like a field of waving grain. If it hadn't been for the purpose they came for I should say it was the handsomest sight I ever saw in my life. I heard the musket shots just below by the Old Brooks Tavern and trembled believing that our folks were killed. Some of the rough, angry soldiers rushed up to this house and fired in but fortunately for me and the children the shots went into the garret and we were safe. How glad I was when they all got by the house and your grandfather and our neighbors reached home alive. — Mary Hartwell's account of the events, as remembered by members of her family.
