= Judge Sewall =

Judge Sewall may refer to:

- David Sewall (1735–1825), was a United States district judge for the District of Maine
- Jonathan Sewall (1729–1796), judge of the Vice Admiralty Court of Nova Scotia
- Samuel Sewall (1652–1730), judge of the Massachusetts Superior Court of Judicature
- Stephen Sewall (1702–1760), judge in colonial Massachusetts
