= Mill Brook (Massachusetts) =

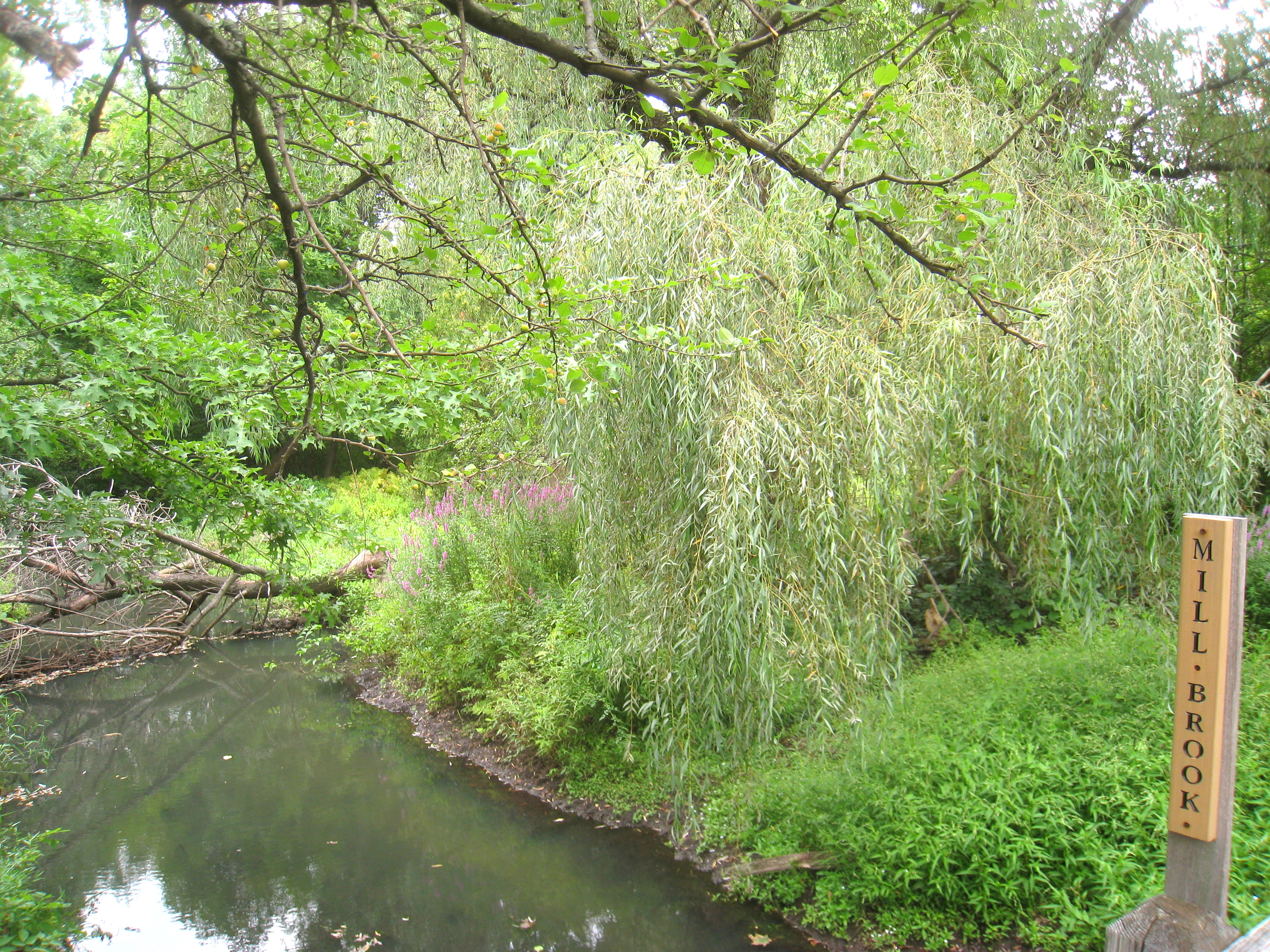
- Mill Brook in Concord, Massachusetts

Location
- Country: United States

Physical characteristics
- Source: Flints Pond
  - location: Lincoln, Massachusetts, U.S.
  - coordinates: 42.43598209°N 71.3148605°W
- Mouth: Concord River
  - location: Concord, Massachusetts, U.S.
  - coordinates: 42.4678828°N 71.352239°W

Mill Brook is a watercourse, about 3 miles (4.8 km) long, in Massachusetts, United States. It is sourced from Flints Pond in Lincoln, Massachusetts, and empties into the Concord River, to the southwest of Old North Bridge in Concord.

Around 2,100 acres (850 ha) of land between Crosby's Corner and Meriam's Corner drain into the brook.

== History ==
In 1635, English settlers established a village beside lower Mill Brook, with a dam, pond and mill being built the following year at the Milldam.

On the afternoon of April 19, 1775, during the first hours of the American Revolutionary War, it was on a bridge over Elm Brook at Meriam's Corner that British regulars were fired upon for the first time by colonial militia during their retreat from Concord to Boston. The bridge is now part of Lexington Road.

The Middlesex Central Railroad built a station and laid railroad tracks beside the brook in 1871 and 1872.

Route 2 was constructed across the highest headwaters, separating the brook from the lower section.

Between 1964 and 1990, the State of Massachusetts stocked the brook with brook trout.

Mill Brook Way was established on the old railroad bed in 1975.

In 1977, Richard T. T. Forman described the brook as "one of the most degraded streams in Concord", with channelization, wetland drainage and the scarcity of fish all being contributing factors.

== In literature ==
Henry David Thoreau mentioned Mill Brook in Journal (1855):

I walk along the Mill Brook below Emerson's, looking into it for some life. Perhaps what moves us in winter is reminiscence of a far-off summer. How we leap by the side of open brooks! What beauty in the running brooks! What life! What society! The cold is merely superficial; it is the summer still at the core, far, far within.

— Henry David Thoreau, Journal

Poet William Ellery Channing wrote The Mill Brook:

I like the maples on my side,

Dead leaves, the darling trout; Laconic rocks (they sometime put me out) And moon or stars that ramble with my tide;

The polished air, I think I could abide.

— William Ellery Channing, The Mill Brook
