= Mount Misery (Lincoln, Massachusetts) =

Hill in Lincoln, Massachusetts, US

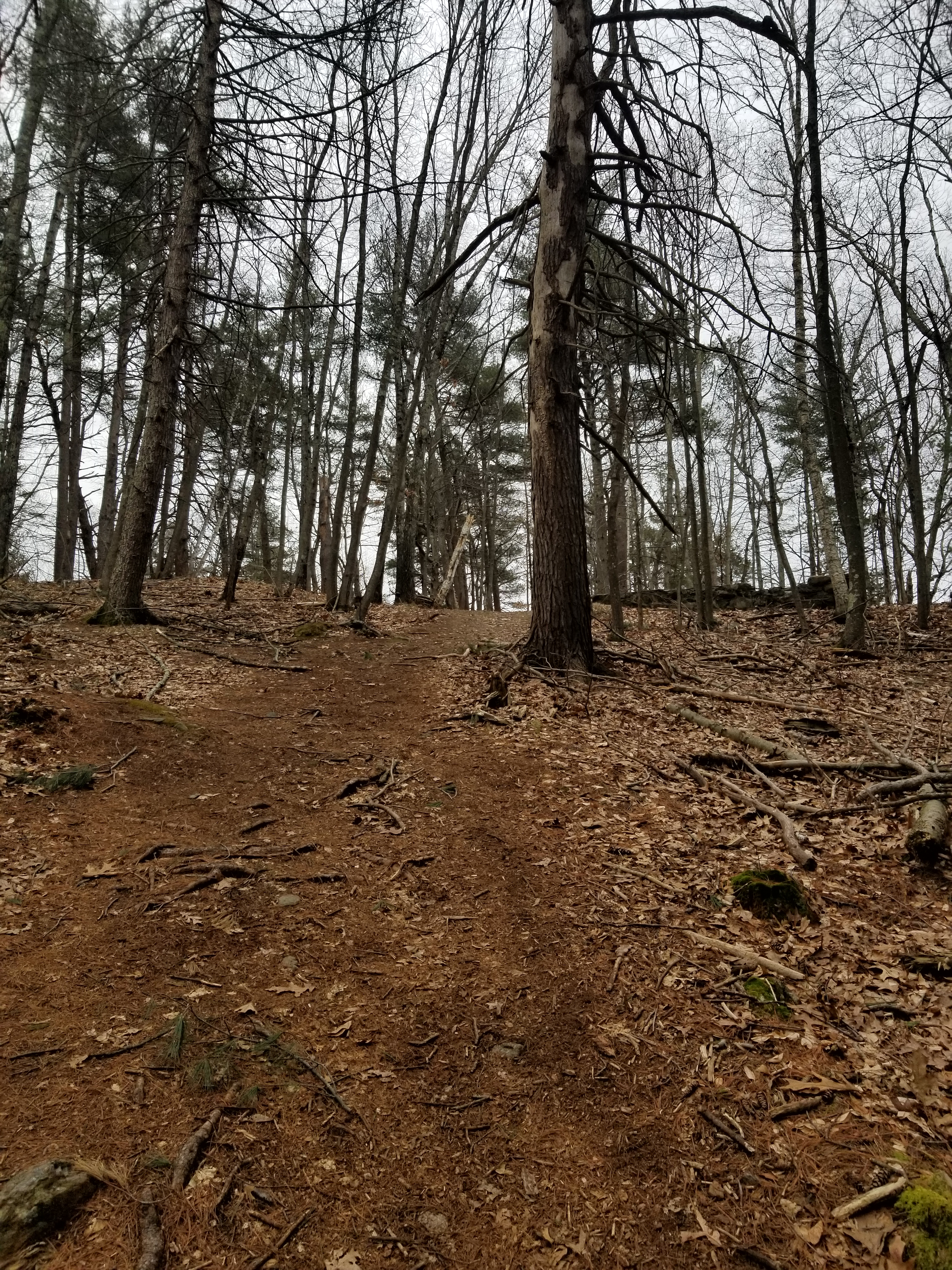
- Looking up to the summit of Mount Misery

Highest point
- Elevation: 284 ft (87 m)
- Prominence: 110 feet
- Coordinates: 42°25′13″N 71°20′47″W

Geography
- Location: Middlesex County, Massachusetts
- Topo map: USGS Framingham

Mount Misery is a 284-foot hill and public conservation land in Lincoln, Massachusetts, on Route 117 (Great Road) and on the Bay Circuit Trail near the Sudbury River. Containing 227 acres (92 ha), Mount Misery is the largest piece of conservation land in the town and contains seven miles of public hiking trails through hills, wetlands and agricultural fields.

== History ==
Although it is unknown for certain, Mount Misery may take its name from the death of a pair of oxen or a sheep on the hill in colonial times. By 1667, the Billings family owned land around Beaver Dam Brook and eventually operated a saw mill on the brook, just below what is now the upper pond at the base of Mount Misery. Evidence of this mill remains today near the brook. Concord writer Henry David Thoreau often hiked and recorded his experiences on the hill in his journal in the 1850s. In the 1940s, James DeNormandie acquired much of the land around Mount Misery to prevent it from being developed and for his own agriculture uses. He dammed the brook and excavated soil to form the lower pond, as well as re-damming the original upper mill pond, and he built a cabin on the top of Mount Misery which later burned. DeNormandie sold Mount Misery to the town as public conservation land in 1969. The land contains Beaver Dam Brook, which is still home to several beavers, and Terrapin Lake, a kettle hole, where cranberries were grown until the 1990s.

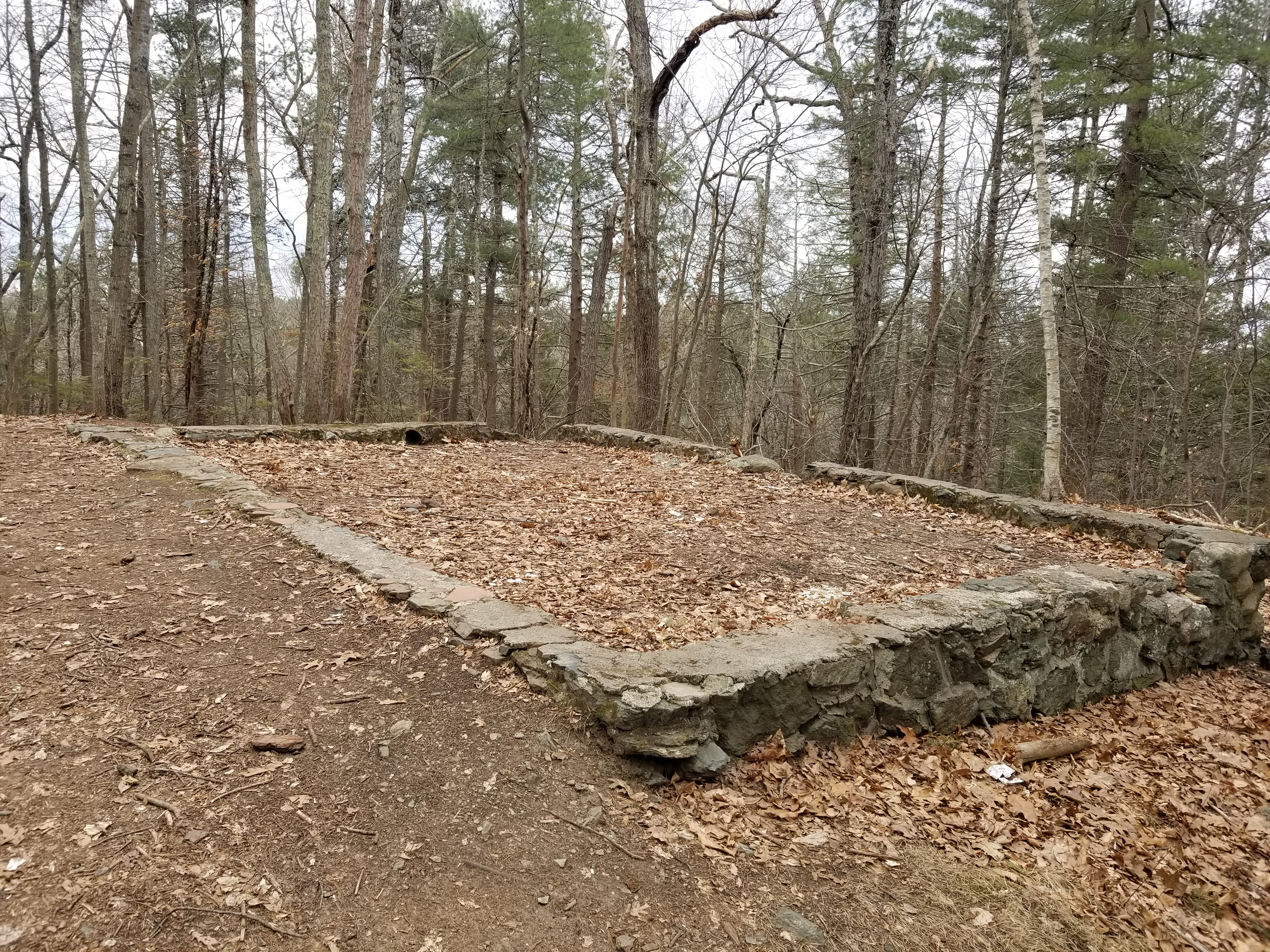
Foundation of James DeNormandie's cabin from the mid-20th century on the summit of Mount Misery

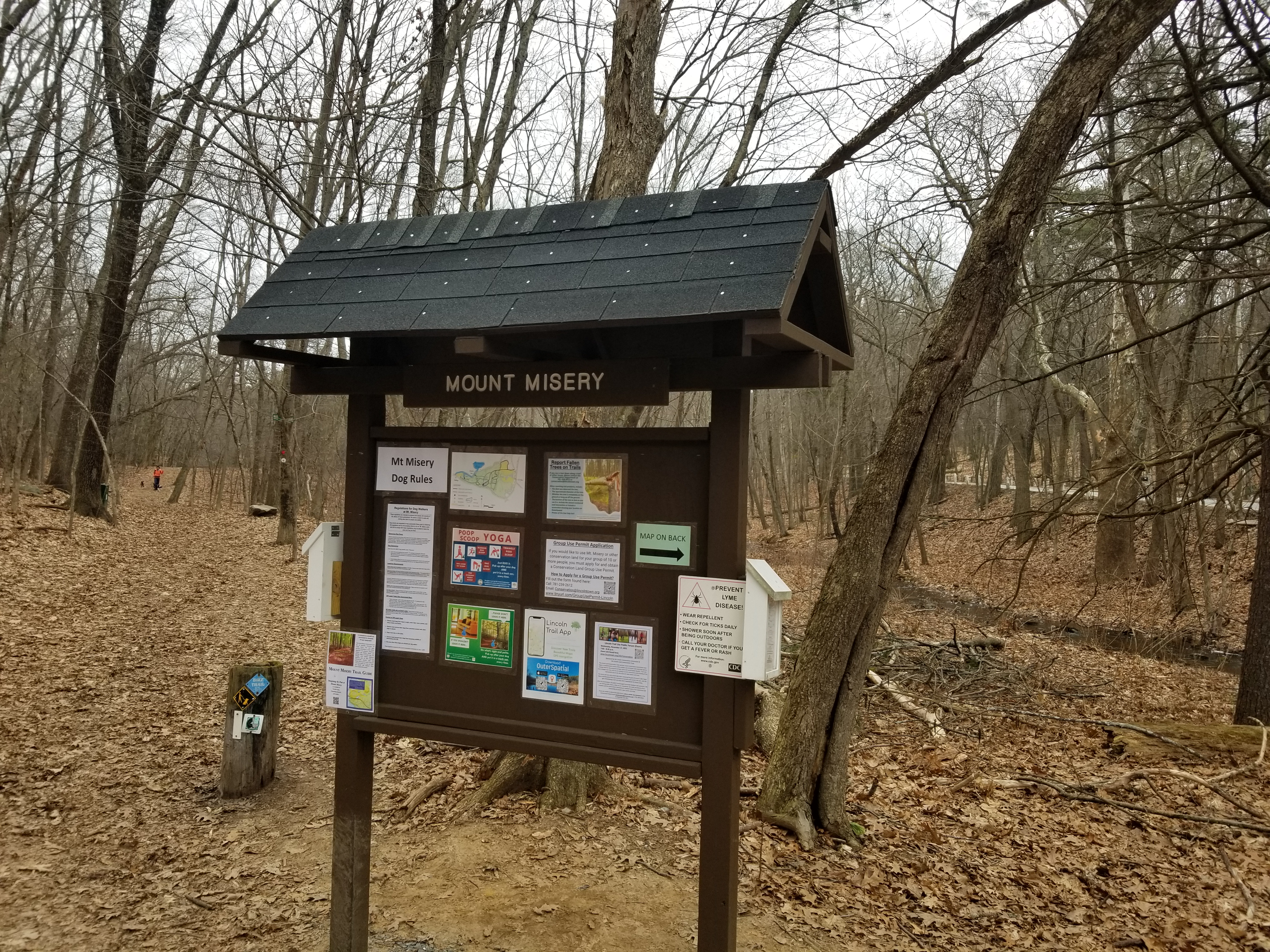
Trailhead entrance on Route 117

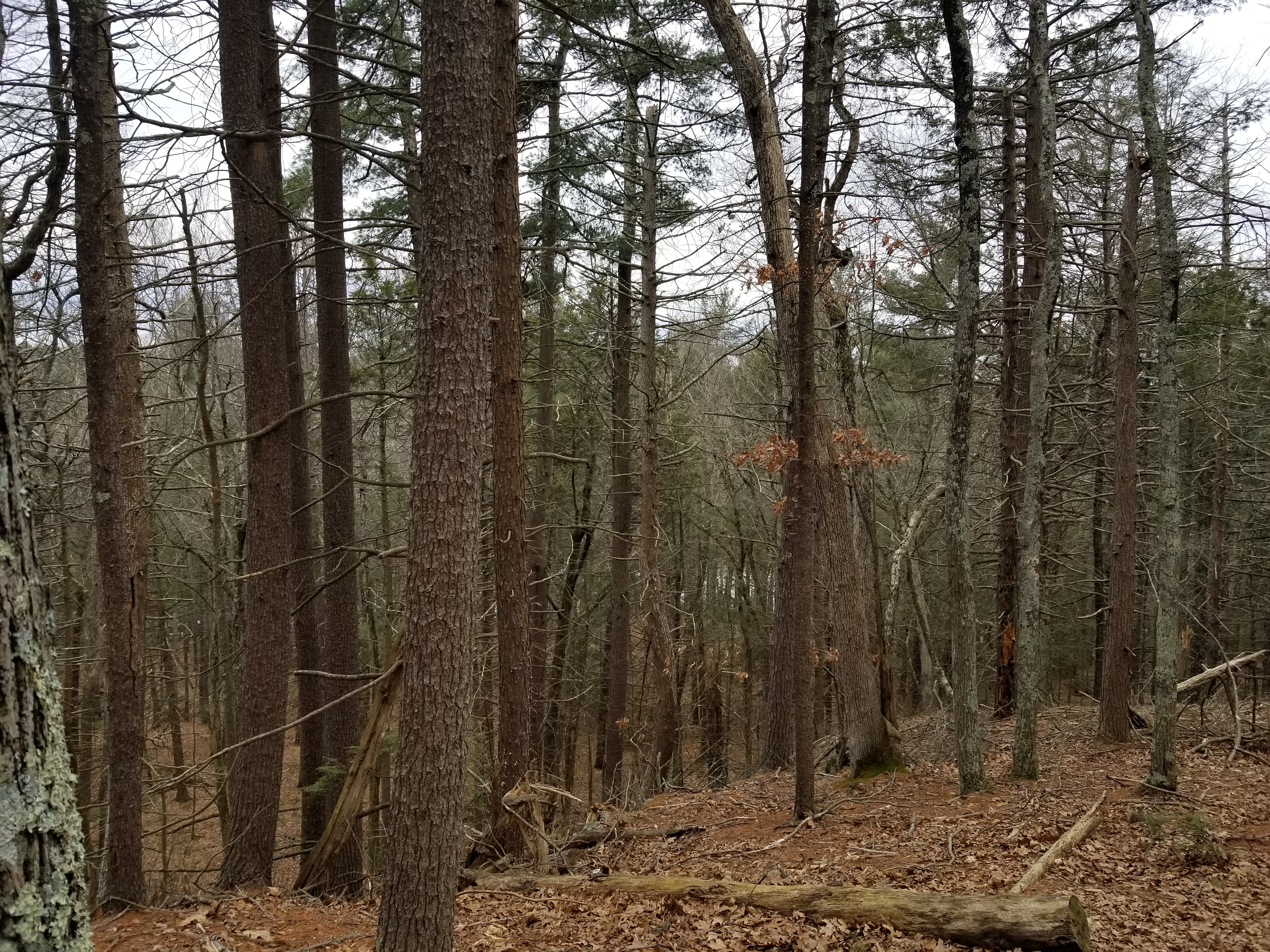
View from Mt. Misery

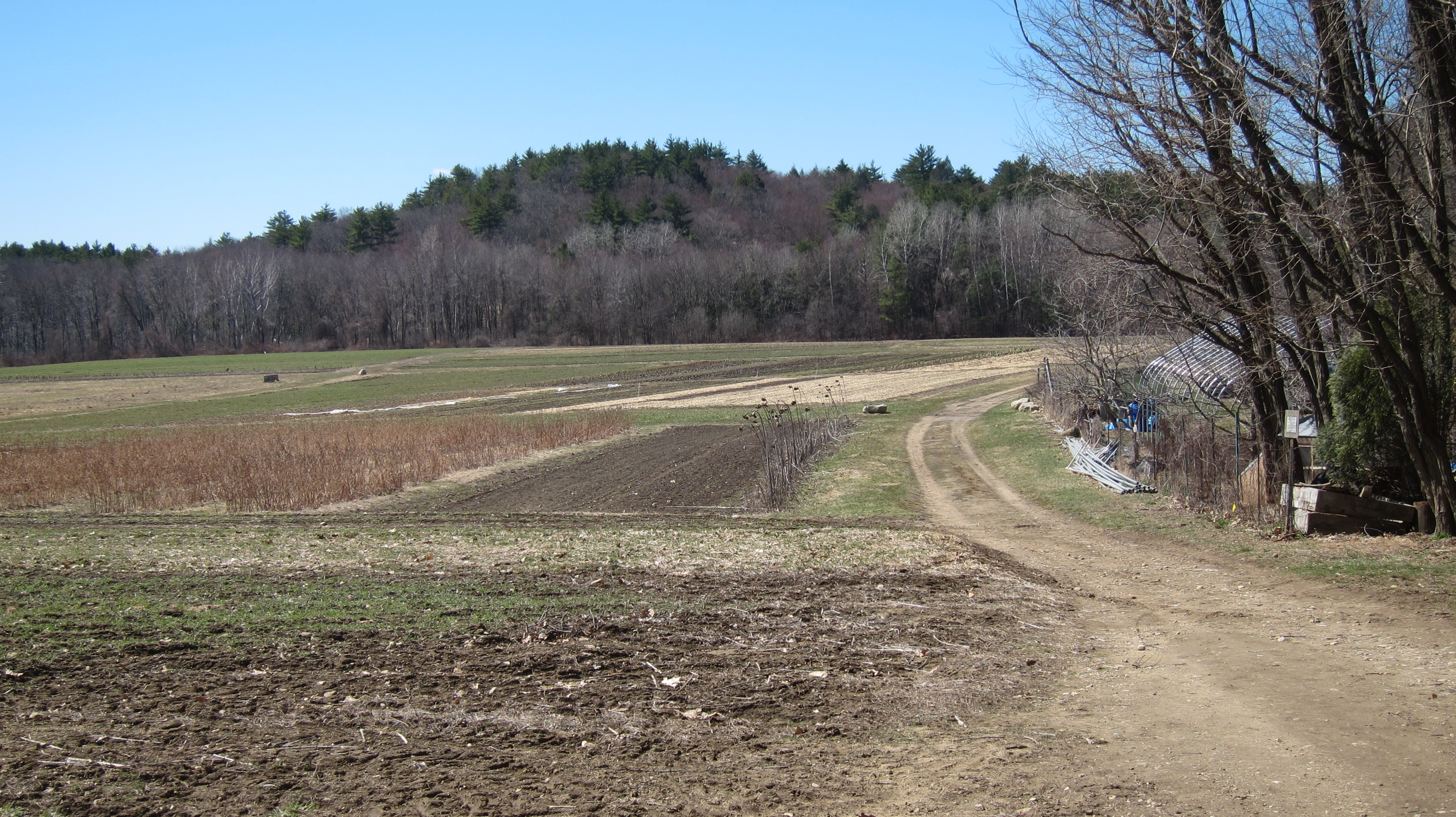
View of Mt. Misery

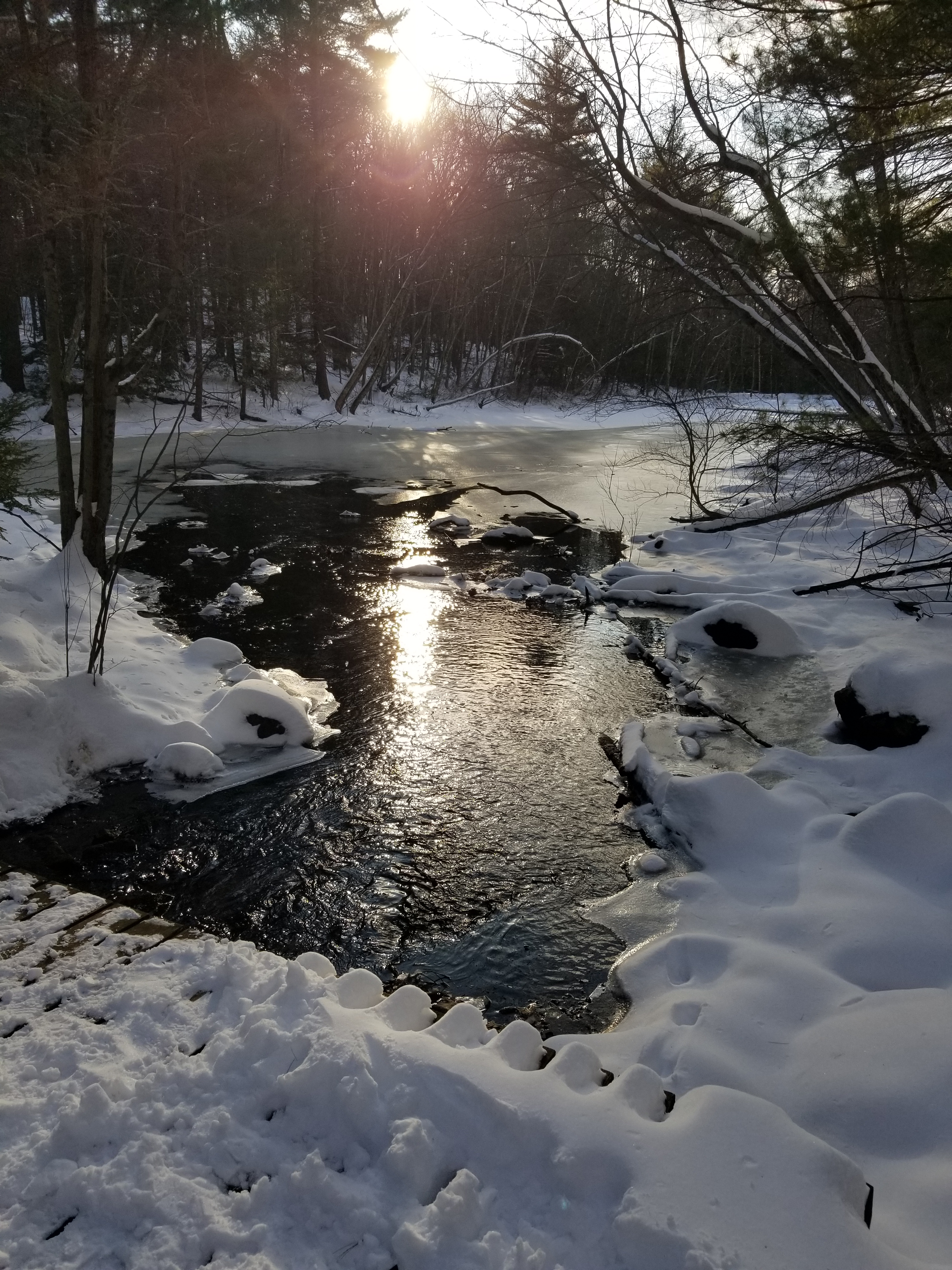
Bridge over Beaver Dam Brook at former Mill Pond (upper pond)
