= Mary Hartwell =

- Born: March 22, 1747; Concord, Province of Massachusetts Bay
- Died: July 23, 1846 (aged 99); Lincoln, Massachusetts, U.S.
- Spouse: Samuel Hartwell (m. 1769–1829; his death)

Mary Flint Hartwell (March 22, 1747 – July 23, 1846) was an American woman who played a prominent role in the battles of Lexington and Concord, during the American Revolutionary War of 1775 to 1783.

== Early life ==
Mary Flint was born in Concord, Massachusetts, in 1747, to Ephraim Flint, a founder of Lincoln, Massachusetts, and Ruth Wheeler. She was the second of their five children.

== Personal life ==
On September 12, 1769, a 22-year-old Flint married Samuel Hartwell, son of Ephraim and Elizabeth, who was five years her senior.

== Battles of Lexington Concord ==
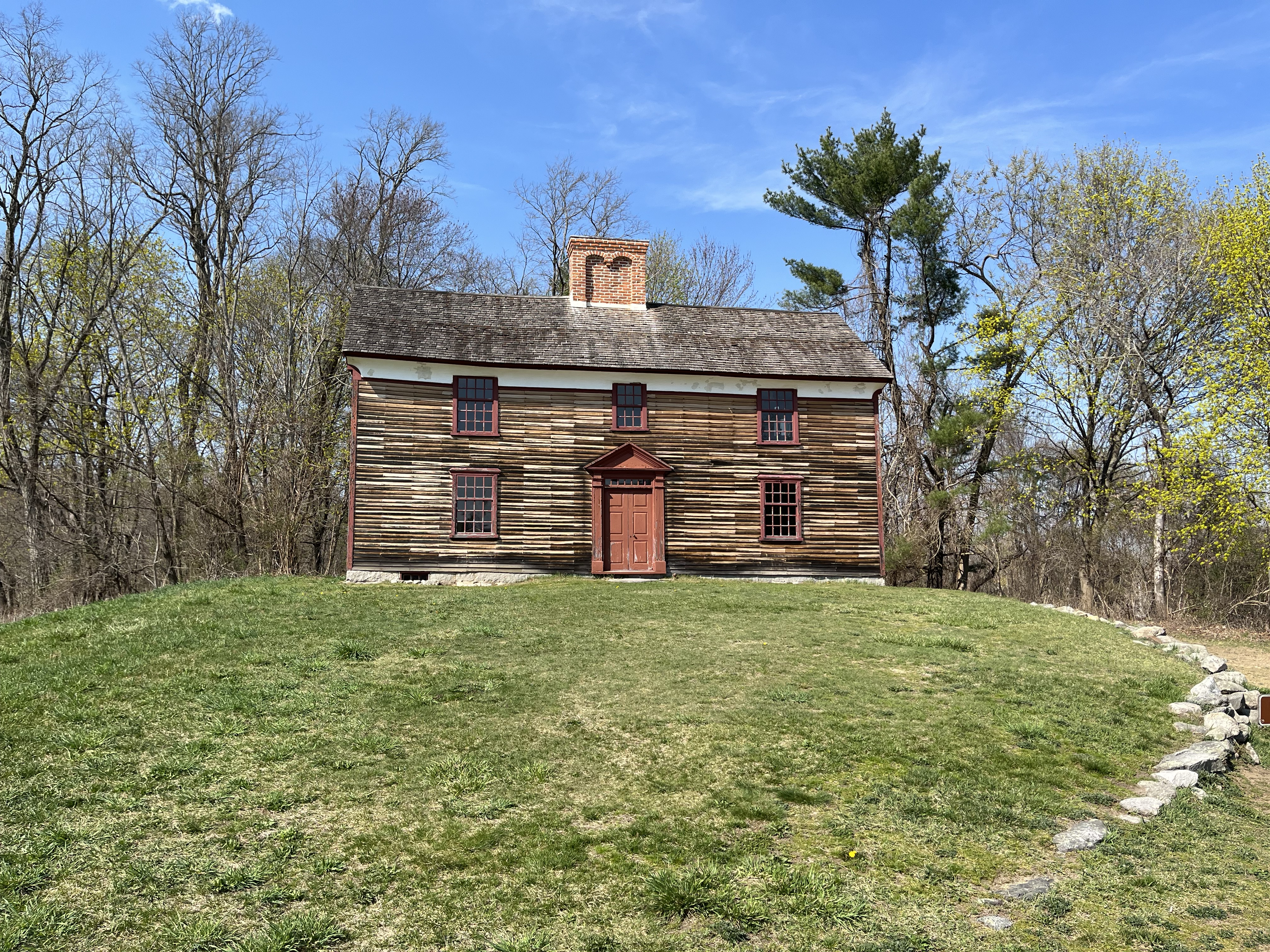
The Captain William Smith House, to which Hartwell traveled to alert its owner of the impending arrival of British troops

In the early hours of April 19, 1775, during Paul Revere's "Midnight Ride", Samuel Prescott escaped a British Army patrol on Battle Road in Concord, Massachusetts. He emerged onto nearby North County Road and sought assistance at Hartwell Tavern. Ephraim Hartwell, the tavern's owner, sent his black slave, Violet, down the road to the Samuel Hartwell House to alert his son, Samuel, and his family of the impending arrival of the British soldiers. Mary made her way to alert Captain William Smith, commanding officer of the Lincoln minutemen, who lived nearby. The minutemen received the notice in time, and arrived at Old North Bridge before their enemy. Prescott, meanwhile, made it to Concord.

The army of the King marched up in fine order and their bayonets glistened in the sunlight like a field of waving grain. If it hadn't been for the purpose they came for I should say it was the handsomest sight I ever saw in my life.

I heard the musket shots just below by the Old Brooks Tavern and trembled believing that our folks were killed. Some of the rough, angry soldiers rushed up to this house and fired in but fortunately for me and the children the shots went into the garret and we were safe. How glad I was when they all got by the house and your grandfather and our neighbors reached home alive.

— Mary Hartwell's account of the events, as remembered by members of her family.

== Death ==
Hartwell died in 1846, aged 99. She had survived her husband by seventeen years, and was buried beside him in Lincoln Cemetery (also known as the Precinct Burial Ground).
