= Thomas Graves (judge) =

American judge (1684–1747)

Thomas Graves or Greaves (1684 – June 19, 1747) was an associate justice of the Massachusetts Superior Court of Judicature from 1737 to 1738. Appointed by Governor Jonathan Belcher, he served as a temporary replacement for Edmund Quincy while the latter was in England on other business, and was replaced after Quincy's death by Stephen Sewall. Graves was born in Charlestown and graduated from Harvard College in 1703. His father, also named Thomas, was a magistrate in Middlesex County best known for denouncing the Salem witch trials of 1692.

Graves was trained as a medical doctor, but was drawn into legal work with an appointment as a special judge in Middlesex County in 1731. He was eventually appointed to that county's court of common pleas, where he served until his temporary appointment to the provincial high court in 1737. Edmund Quincy, whose seat he took, was sent to England as a commissioner concerning the border between Massachusetts and New Hampshire, died in England of smallpox. After Sewall was named to replace Quincy, Graves resigned from the high court and returned to the court of common pleas, on which he served until his death.

Political offices
Preceded by Edmund Quincy	Justice of the Massachusetts Superior Court of Judicature; 1737–1738	Succeeded by Stephen Sewall
