= The Carroll School =

Coordinates: 42.4285°N 71.32°W

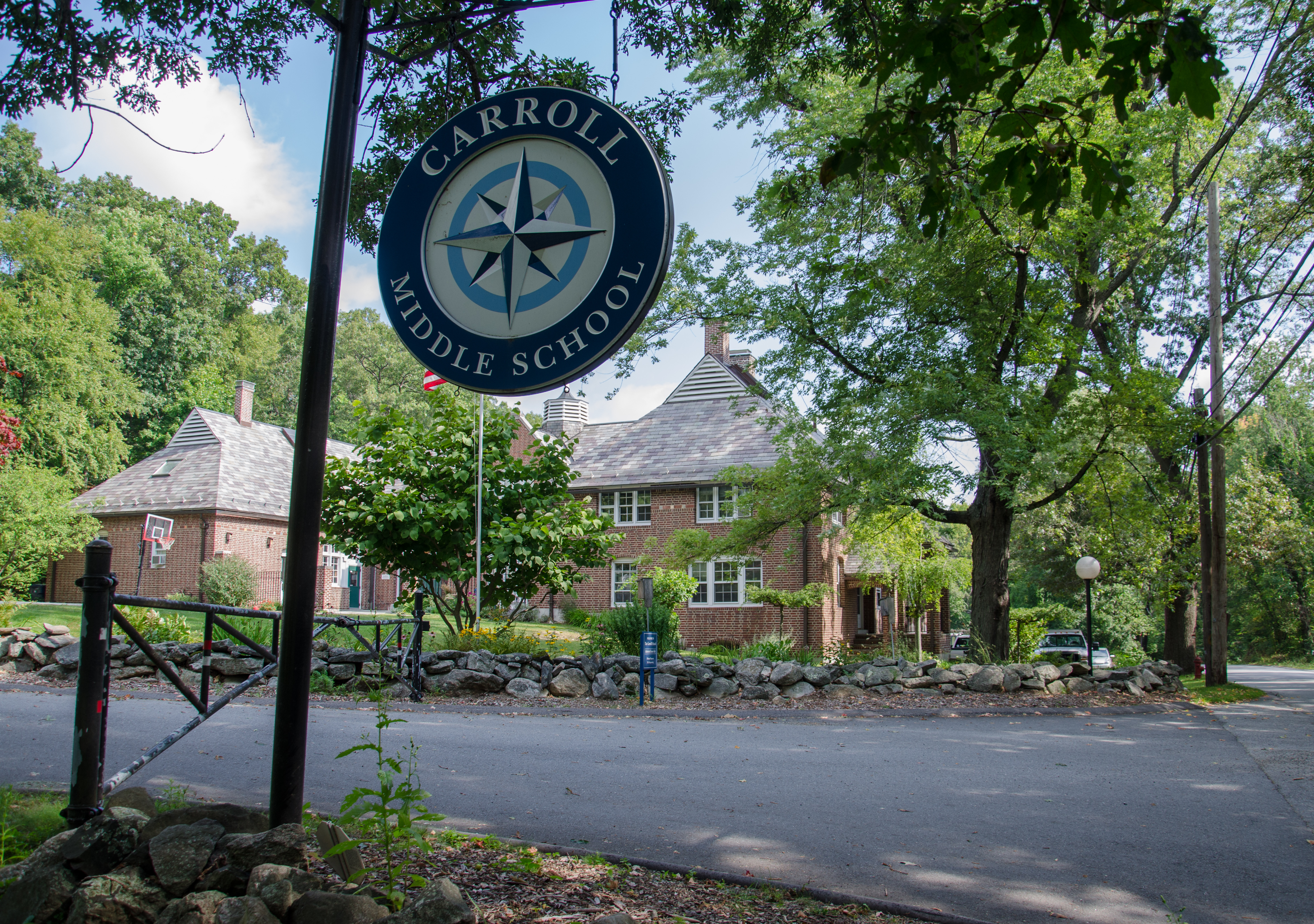
- 25 Baker Bridge Rd. Lincoln, MA, USA

Information
- Type: Private
- Established: 1967
- Head of school: Renée Greenfield
- Website: www.carrollschool.org

The Carroll School is a school for students diagnosed with learning disabilities such as dyslexia. The school consists of a lower school in Waltham, Massachusetts, a Middle School in Lincoln, and an upper school in Wayland, Massachusetts. The school serves grades 1 through 9.

== History ==
The Carroll School was founded in 1967 by Dr. Edwin Cole, F. Gorham Brigham, and Samuel Lowe. Since its founding, the campus has expanded multiple times. The lower campus goes up to grade five. The middle campus goes up to grade eight. The upper school campus is a former mansion, and was bought for $5 million from businessman John Fish in 2016. Located in Wayland, Massachusetts, it serves the two-year 8th-9th grade program as well as the non-academic administration.
