= Arborvitae Cemetery =

Cemetery in Lincoln, Massachusetts

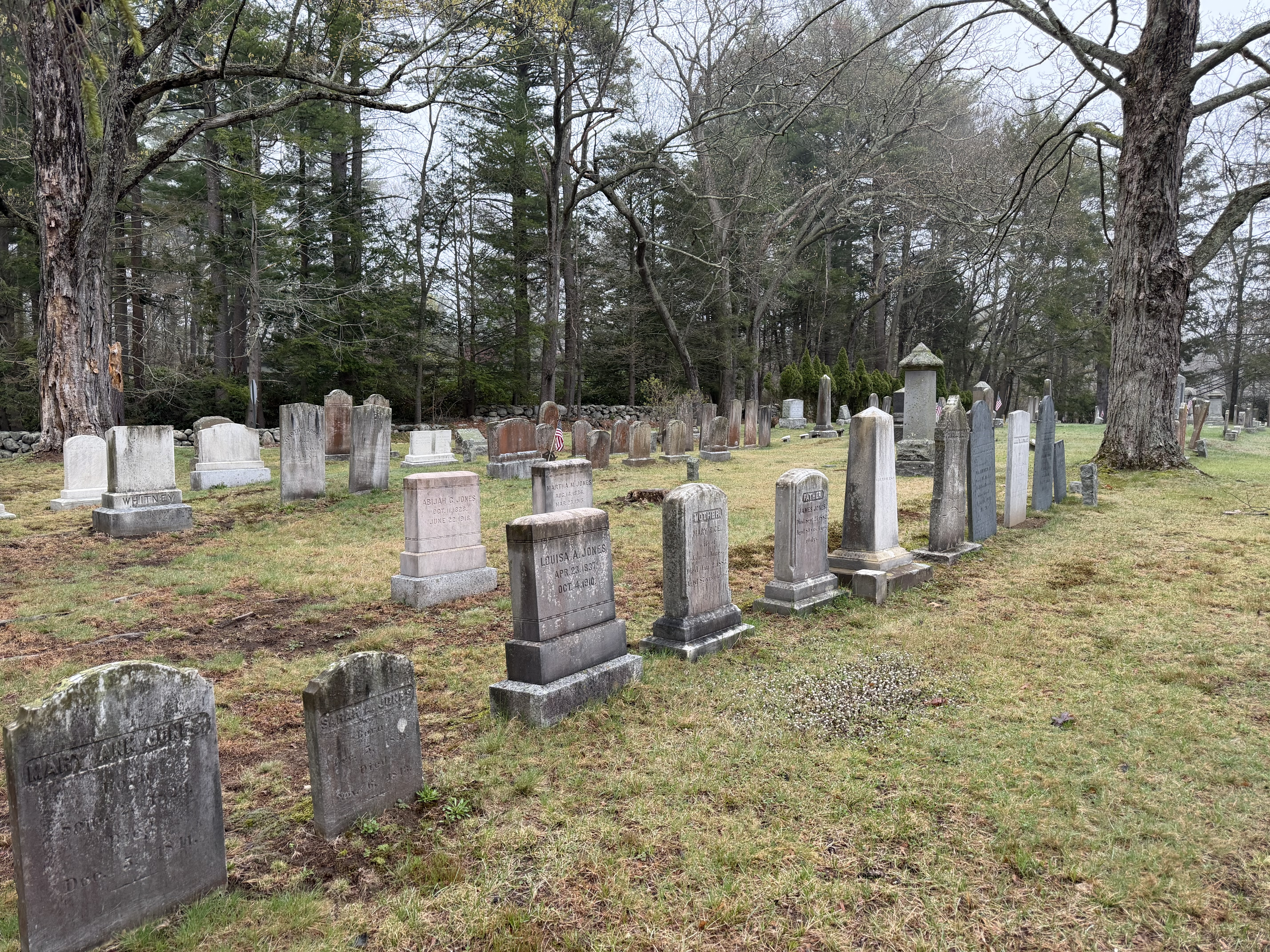
- Interactive map of Arborvitae Cemetery

Details
- Established: c. 1837 (189 years ago)
- Location: Trapelo Road, Lincoln, Massachusetts, U.S.
- Country: United States
- Coordinates: 42.425415°N 71.298563°W
- Owned by: Town of Lincoln
- Find a Grave: Arborvitae Cemetery

Arborvitae Cemetery (also known as the Triangular Cemetery or Three-Cornered Cemetery) is a historic cemetery in Lincoln, Massachusetts, United States. Dating to around 1837, it was the third cemetery established by the town, after Precinct Burial Ground (also known as Lincoln Cemetery or Old Burying Ground) and Town Hill Cemetery. The cemetery is located in a triangular plot of land bordered by Trapelo Road to the south, Lexington Road to the west and Old Lexington Road to the east.

Some interments pre-date the establishment of the cemetery, having been moved there after the opening ceremony.

In 1946, the Daughters of the American Revolution copied the inscriptions from the headstones in the cemetery.

== Notable interments ==
- James DeNormandie (1907–1987), Massachusetts state senator, legislator and preservationist
