= Flint House (Massachusetts) =

Historic house in Massachusetts, United States

- U.S. National Register of Historic Places
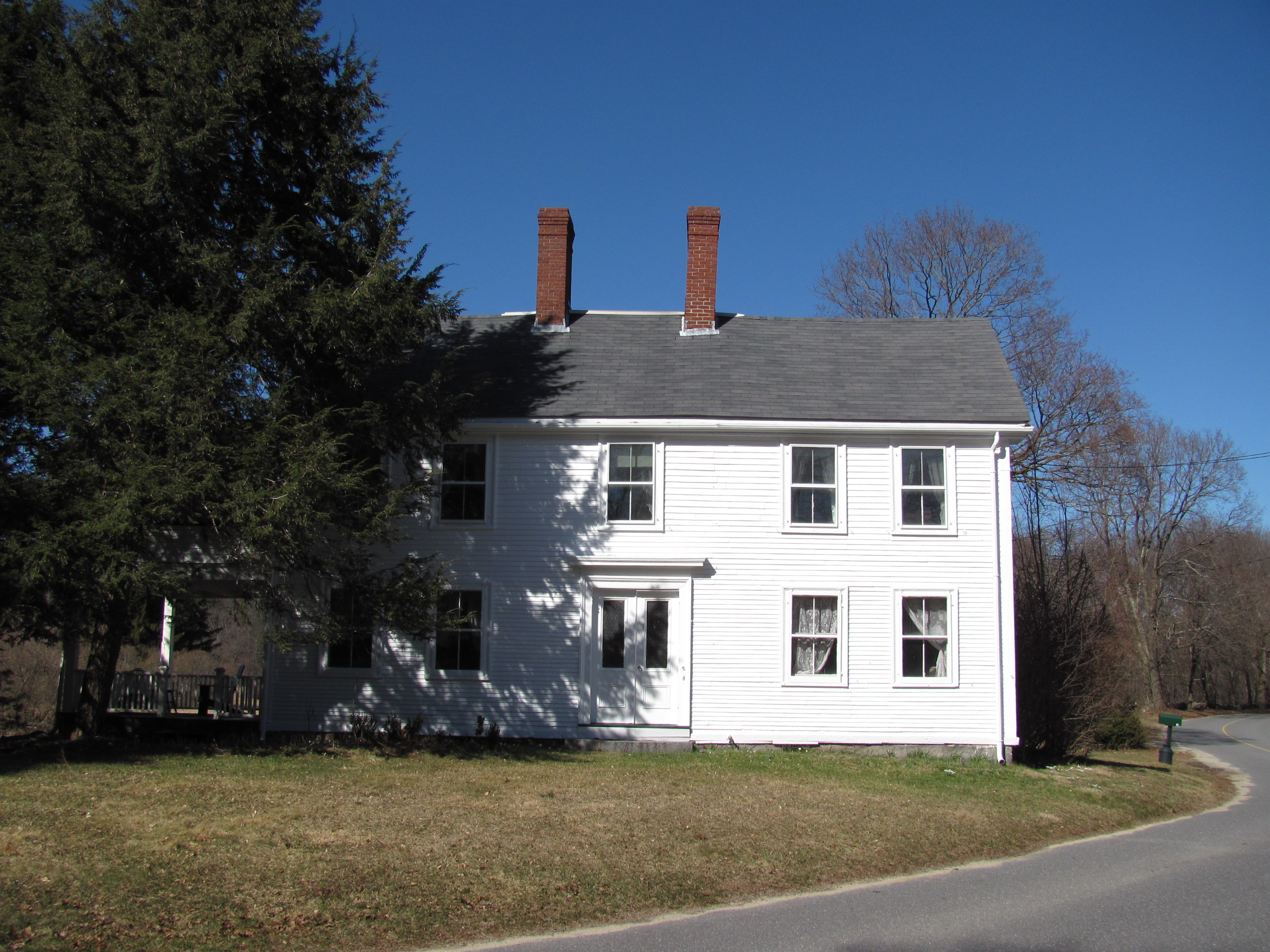
- Flint House

- Location within Massachusetts Location within the United States
- Location: Lincoln, Massachusetts
- Coordinates: 42°25′44″N 71°17′46″W
- Area: 1.84 acres (0.74 ha)
- Built: 1708
- Architectural style: Colonial, Georgian
- NRHP reference No.: 03000684
- Added to NRHP: July 25, 2003

The Flint House is a historic First Period house at 28 Lexington Road in Lincoln, Massachusetts. Standing on land acquired by Thomas Flint in the 1640s, the oldest portions of this house have very early colonial construction, and its main block either is, or contains portions of, a "mansion" built by Ephraim Flint and mentioned in a 1709 deed. This main block appears to have portions of two older structures that were joined; the exact sequence of construction is difficult due to extensive alterations of the building over the 18th and 19th centuries. The property includes a barn which is thought to have been built before 1750, and is unaltered despite having been moved a relatively short distance on the grounds. The house has been occupied by nine generations of Flints, who have been a major force in the civic life of Lincoln.

The Flint family received their Century Farm Award in 1990. The house was listed on the National Register of Historic Places in 2003.

In 2015, Sarah Flint was the eleventh generation of the family living on Matlock Farm. She stated that the farm is the second-oldest working, family farm in the country.

Edward Flint, a cousin of Ephraim, who died in 1754, is buried "below in the corner of the old Flint lot." This is believed to be today's Precinct Burial Ground (or Lincoln Cemetery), around 0.5 miles (0.80 km) to the northeast.

== See also ==
- Flints Pond
- National Register of Historic Places listings in Middlesex County, Massachusetts
