= Patricia Warner =

American spy (1921–2020)

Patricia Rosalind Cutler (May 21, 1921 - September 26, 2020) was an American spy and a Congressional Gold Medal recipient.

After her husband was killed on the U.S.S. Duncan in the Battle of Guadalcanal less than a year after they got married, Warner wanted to help the war effort and joined the Office of Strategic Services. She served as a spy for two years. Warner was stationed in Spain, where her cover was working as a secretary. She infiltrated the high society and helped downed American pilots escape from Nazi occupied France through the French Resistance. She also traveled to New York, Washington, D.C., and London.

Warner earned a degree from Barnard College in 1949. She was offered a Fulbright Scholarship in 1951, but declined it to marry her second husband. Warner later was awarded a certificate in learning disabilities from Tufts University in 1975. In 1985, she earned a master's degree in independent studies, specializing in eating disorders, from Lesley College.

Warner had six children, with one from her first marriage and five from her second. In 2019, at the age of 98, she was awarded the Congressional Gold Medal in a surprise ceremony by Congresswoman Katherine Clark at the Lincoln Public Library. She lived in Lincoln, Massachusetts until her death on September 26, 2020, at age 99.
