= Gardy's Millpond =

- Location within Virginia Location within the United States
- Location: Northumberland / Westmoreland counties, Virginia, United States
- Coordinates: 38°00′6.48″N 76°36′12.85″W
- Type: reservoir
- Basin countries: United States
- Surface area: 75 acres (30.35 ha)
- Average depth: 4 ft (1 m)

Gardy's Millpond is a 75 acres (30.35 ha) reservoir located in a tranquil setting along the Westmoreland and Northumberland county line in Northeast Virginia.

The millpond is relatively shallow with an average depth of about 4 ft (1 m). The upstream portion of the impoundment is swampy and the shoreline is largely forested. Scenic and decorated with lily pads, Gardy's Millpond is a quiet spot to fish for black crappie, bluegill and redear sunfish, bream, chain pickerel, largemouth bass and yellow perch.

A new dam was built here soon after Hurricane Bob caused severe damage to the older structure in 1985. The place was subsequently stocked with fish and re-opened to public fishing in 1990.
