= Sophie Freud =

Austrian American psychologist (1924–2022)

- Born: Miriam Sophie Freud; August 6, 1924; Vienna, Austria
- Died: June 3, 2022 (aged 97); Lincoln, Massachusetts, U.S.
- Education: Radcliffe College; Simmons University; Brandeis University
- Occupation: social worker
- Spouse: Paul Loewenstein (m. 1945; div. 1985)
- Children: 3
- Parent(s): Jean Martin Freud; Esti Freud
- Relatives: Walter Freud (brother); Sigmund Freud (grandfather); Freud family

Miriam Sophie Freud (August 6, 1924 – June 3, 2022) was an Austrian American clinical social worker, educator, and author. The granddaughter of Sigmund Freud, she was a critic of psychoanalysis, aspects of which she described as "narcissistic indulgence". Her criticisms of the elder Freud's psychoanalytical doctrines made her the "black sheep" of the family — yet she observed how all of her female relatives, including her mother, Ernestine, and aunt Anna, were adversely affected by Sigmund's claims about women and their internal experiences.

== Early life and education ==
Freud was born in Vienna, Austria, and was raised in what her mother, Ernestine "Esti" Freud (née Drucker, 1896–1980), a speech therapist, referred to as an upper class Jewish ghetto. Her father, lawyer Jean Martin Freud (1889–1967), was the eldest son of Sigmund Freud. He later became the director of Freud's Psychoanalytic Publishing House. Sophie had one elder brother, Walter (1921–2004).

Freud fled Vienna in 1938 after the Anschluss. From 1942, she lived in Boston and attended Radcliffe College, receiving her bachelor's degree in 1946. Subsequent studies at Simmons University School of Social Work led to a master's degree in 1948. Freud was awarded a doctoral degree from Brandeis University in 1970.

== Career ==
Freud then taught at Simmons College, along with taking time to teach social work in Canada and across countries in Europe. She went on to write a book entitled Living in the Shadow of the Freud Family for her mother, which was released in Germany as In the Shadow of the Freud Family: My Mother Experiences the 20th Century. She also wrote My Three Mothers and Other Passions. She appeared in the 2003 film Neighbours: Freud and Hitler in Vienna, in which she stated: "In my eyes, both Adolf Hitler and my grandfather were false prophets of the twentieth century."

Freud served as the book review editor for the American Journal of Psychotherapy.

=== Research ===
A primary focus of Freud's life's research alongside her social work activities was on re-investigating the work of her grandfather regarding women and narcissism. In the 1970s, she conducted surveys of women on their "passions" and the things they felt strongly about, showing that Sigmund Freud was incorrect in his claim that only men have "true passion".

== Personal life ==
Freud was the last surviving granddaughter of Sigmund Freud, whom she visited regularly on Sundays when she was a child. She was a feminist who pushed for women's rights in academia and fought against the presumption that a woman who became pregnant would be unable to continue with education or, in her case, professional social work activities.

Freud married Paul Loewenstein (1921–1992) in 1945; the couple had three children. They divorced in 1985 and Freud reverted to using her maiden name. On June 3, 2022, Freud died of pancreatic cancer at her home in Lincoln, Massachusetts, aged 97.

== Bibliography ==
- —; Freud, Ernestine Drucker (2007). Living in the Shadow of the Freud Family. Praeger Publishers. ISBN 9780275994150.
- — (1988). My Three Mothers and Other Passions. NYU Press. ISBN 9780814726006.
