= Richard T.T. Forman =

American landscape ecologist

Richard T. T. Forman
- Born: November 10, 1935 (age 90); Richmond, Virginia
- Awards: Lindback Foundation Award for Excellence in Teaching

Academic background
- Education: B.S. Haverford College; Ph.D University of Pennsylvania
- Thesis: Growth under controlled conditions, an explanation of the distribution patterns of the moss Tetraphis pellucida (1961)
- Doctoral advisor: Ralph O. Erickson

Richard T. T. Forman is a landscape ecologist. He is a professor at the Graduate School of Design and at Harvard College in Harvard University. Forman has been called the "father" of landscape ecology for his work linking ecological science with spatial pattern, describing how people and nature interweave on land.

He is the author of a widely held textbook for landscape ecology, Land Mosaics: The Ecology of Landscapes and Regions. According to WorldCat, the book is held in 713 libraries.

He served as Vice President of the Ecological Society of America from 1982 to 1983 and was elected a Fellow in 2012.

== Early life and education ==
Forman earned a B.S. in biology from Haverford College in 1957, followed by a Ph.D. in botany from the University of Pennsylvania in 1961. He later received honorary degrees including an L.H.D. from Miami University in 1987, D.Sc. from Florida International University in 2001, and an M.A. (honorary) from Harvard University in 1985. He was also awarded the European equivalent of honorary doctoral degrees: a Bronze Medal from the University of Florence, Italy in 1997, and a Bronze Medal from Charles University, Prague, Czech Republic in 1998.

== Academic career ==
Forman began his academic career as an assistant professor of biology at the Escuela Agricola Panamericana (Panamerican Agricultural College, El Zamorano, Honduras) from 1962 to 1963. He then served as an assistant professor of botany and zoology at the University of Wisconsin from 1963 to 1966. In 1966, he moved to Rutgers University, where he remained until 1984, advancing through the ranks to become Professor II. During his time at Rutgers, he also directed the Hutcheson Memorial Forest Center from 1972 to 1984 and the Graduate Program in Botany and Plant Physiology from 1979 to 1983.

In 1984, Forman joined Harvard University as the PAES Professor of Landscape Ecology in the Graduate School of Design, where he taught until 2013. He then served as a research professor until 2018, before becoming professor emeritus. Forman held appointments in both graduate and undergraduate programs, notably teaching a junior-senior course in ecology and land-use planning within Harvard's Faculty of Arts and Sciences.

=== Recent work ===
In recent years, Forman has turned his landscape ecology expertise toward the localized ecology and history of Concord, Massachusetts. His publication Deciphering Concord’s Old Stone Walls and What They Indicate (2022), produced in collaboration with the Concord Land Conservation Trust, reveals the labor and ingenuity behind New England’s iconic stone walls. Drawing from field investigations and historical records, Forman traced different wall types those built for pastures, cultivation fields, and walls for cows or sheep dating back to the 17th and 18th centuries. He explained how the structure of these walls reflected agricultural needs, including taller, stronger fences for sheep, oxen, and horses, and heavily built, often damaged stone walls along town roads.

In another study, he investigated the sudden proliferation of wild rice in Concord’s Fairyland Pond and Concord River, linking it to drought conditions that enhanced germination in oxygenated sediments. He noted the plant’s ecological role as a food source for ducks and fish, and perhaps a revegetation marker for wetland health.

Forman also co-authored Ecology Along Concord Trails: Exploring Fourteen Areas with Delia Kaye, Concord’s Natural Resources Director, and Robert White. The guidebook blends ecological interpretation with the region’s natural and cultural history. He regards these enduring local features from riverside grass to lichen-layered stone walls as "treasures to discover," offering insight into the intertwined story of land use, biodiversity, and human settlement.

== Research and contributions ==
=== Early Ecology ===
Forman's early research focused on plant, bird, and forest ecology, and he was among the first to emphasize spatial scale in ecological analysis. His 1976 study on patch size and biodiversity, designed with statistical rigor, helped catalyze the development of landscape ecology. His 1979 book on the Pine Barrens clearly stimulated his focus on whole landscapes.

=== Landscape Ecology ===
Forman co-authored the seminal text Landscape Ecology (1986) with the leading French scholar Michel Godron. The book introduced the influential patch–corridor–matrix model, now foundational in spatial ecological analysis. His solo volume, Land Mosaics: The Ecology of Landscapes and Regions (1995), extended the field globally and won the International Association for Landscape Ecology Award. This phase also marked the beginning of Forman's international collaborations. A more applied guide, Landscape Ecology Principles in Landscape Architecture and Land-Use Planning (1996), was co-authored with a Harvard student and a Norwegian ecologist and brought these concepts into practice.

=== Road Ecology ===
Forman helped found the field of road ecology, analyzing how transportation networks affect ecological systems. His co-authored 2003 book, Road Ecology: Science and Solutions, brought together contributions from 14 experts and remains a foundational text. He later advanced the concept of a “netway system” an alternative infrastructure model replacing fossil-fuel-driven roadways with ecologically integrated networks.

=== Urban Ecology and Planning ===
Forman then turned his attention to urban regions, applying ecological science to spatial planning at large metropolitan scales. His 2004 book Mosaico territorial para la región metropolitana de Barcelona and Urban Regions: Ecology and Planning Beyond the City (2008) brought together design, planning, and ecology. These were followed by Urban Ecology: Science of Cities (2014), which synthesized global urban ecology research and was a finalist for the Society of Biology Award in London.

=== Town Ecology ===
In Towns, Ecology, and the Land (2019), Forman addressed the ecological significance of small towns and villages, which are home to nearly half of the world's population. The book explored towns’ roles in resource use, land patterns, and ecological impacts, further emphasizing his commitment to scale-sensitive environmental work.

=== Integrative themes ===
Beginning in 1981 with landscape ecology and continuing through 2019 with town ecology, Forman engaged with international colleagues. He co-authored books with French (1986), Dutch (1990), Norwegian (1986), and Canadian (2003) ecologists, delivered over 300 invited talks in more than 30 countries, and lived in 8 countries across 4 continents. His work consistently incorporated global examples and literature. He was recognized with Bronze Medals from the University of Florence and Charles University in Prague, and is considered one of the few American ecologists who consistently presented avant-garde ecological ideas on a worldwide stage. Forman's work followed a thoughtful trajectory, beginning with animal, plant, and forest ecology, moving into landscape ecology, and expanding into road ecology, urban region planning, urban ecology, and ultimately, town ecology reflecting a career-long commitment to understanding and managing the interplay between nature and human systems across all scales.

== Selected publications ==
- Forman, Richard T. T. (1964). "Growth under Controlled Conditions to Explain the Hierarchical Distributions of a Moss, Tetraphis pellucida". Ecological Monographs. 34 (1): 2–25. Bibcode:1964EcoM...34....1F. doi:10.2307/1948461. ISSN 0012-9615. JSTOR 1948461.
- Forman, Richard T. T. (1969). "Comparison of Coverage, Biomass, and Energy as Measures of Standing Crop of Bryophytes in Various Ecosystems". Bulletin of the Torrey Botanical Club. 96 (5): 582–591. doi:10.2307/2483795. ISSN 0040-9618. JSTOR 2483795.
- Forman, Richard T. T. (1975). "Canopy Lichens with Blue-Green Algae: A Nitrogen Source in a Colombian Rain Forest". Ecology. 56 (5): 1176–1184. Bibcode:1975Ecol...56.1176F. doi:10.2307/1936157. ISSN 0012-9658. JSTOR 1936157.
- Allen, Edith Bach; Forman, Richard T. T. (1976). "Plant Species Removals and Old-Field Community Structure and Stability". Ecology. 57 (6). Ecological Society of America (Wiley): 1233–1243. Bibcode:1976Ecol...57.1233A. doi:10.2307/1935047. ISSN 0012-9658. JSTOR 1935047.
- Forman, Richard T. T.; Alexander, Lauren E. (1998). "Roads and Their Major Ecological Effects". Annual Review of Ecology and Systematics. 29 (1). Annual Reviews: 207–231. Bibcode:1998AnRES..29..207F. doi:10.1146/annurev.ecolsys.29.1.207. ISSN 0066-4162.

=== Books ===
- Forman, Richard T. T., ed. 1979. Pine Barrens: Ecosystem and Landscape. New York: Academic Press, ISBN 9780122634505 According to WorldCat, the book is held in 562 libraries
- Forman, Richard T. T. and Michel Godron 1986. Landscape Ecology. John Wiley and Sons (New York) ISBN 0471870374
- Zonneveld, Isaak S.; Baudry, J.; Zonneveld, Isaak S.; Baudry, Jacques; Forman, Richard T.T, eds. (1990). Changing landscapes: an ecological perspective. Berlin Heidelberg: Springer. ISBN 978-0-387-97102-5.
- Forman, Richard T. T. 1995. Land Mosaics: The Ecology of Landscapes and Regions. Cambridge [England]: Cambridge University Press, ISBN 9780521479806
- Dramstad, Wenche (1996). Landscape Ecology Principles in Landscape Architecture and Land-Use Planning. James D. Olson, Richard T. T. Forman (1st ed.). Washington, D. C: Island Press. ISBN 978-1-61091-467-3.
- Forman, Richard T. T. et al. 2003. Road Ecology: Science and Solutions. Washington, DC: Island Press, 2003. ISBN 9781559639330
- Forman, Richard T. T. (2004). Mosaico territorial para la región metropolitana de Barcelona (in Spanish). Editorial Gustavo Gili. ISBN 978-84-252-1971-9.
- Forman, R. T. T. 2008. Urban Regions: Ecology and Planning Beyond the City. Cambridge University Press, Cambridge/New York. 408 pp .
- Forman, R. T.T. 2014. Urban Ecology: Science of Cities. Cambridge University Press, Cambridge/New York. 462 pp. [Finalist, Society of Biology 2014 Book Award; Chinese edition in preparation].
- Forman, R. T. T. 2015. Launching landscape ecology in America and learning from Europe. In History of Landscape Ecology in the United States. G.W. Barrett, T.L. Barrett and J. Wu, eds. New York: Springer. Pages 13–30.
- Forman, Richard T. T. (2019). Towns, Ecology, and the Land (1st ed.). C: Cambridge University Press. ISBN 978-1-108-18306-2.
- Forman, Richard T. T.; Kaye, Delia R. J.; resident), Robert White (Concord (2021). Ecology Along Concord Trails: Exploring Fourteen Areas. Town of Concord Natural Resources Division.
- Forman, Richard T. T. (2025). Town Ecology: Concord, Thoreau and Onward. Cambridge, United Kingdom: Natural Resources Division, Town of Concord, Massachusetts. p. 337.

== See also ==
- Mill Brook, about which Forman wrote in his 1977 publication Concord's Mill Brook: Flowing Through Time
