= Jonathan M. Sewall =

American lawyer and poet (1748–1808)

Jonathan Mitchel Sewall (1748–1808) was an American lawyer and poet who achieved some notability, published as Jonathan M. Sewall.

He was born in Salem, Massachusetts, to Mitchel Sewall and Elizabeth Price. (or according to other sources, York in 1749 but this is not correct as on Sunday, March 27, 1748 he was christened Jonathan Mitchel Sewall just along the street from his parents home in Salem at the First Church of Salem by The Rev. John Sparhawk.). He and his brother Stephen were adopted by their uncle, Chief Justice Stephen Sewall (1702-1760) and they attended Boston Public Latin School from 1755 until at least 1760 when their uncle died. He studied law with his cousin Jonathan Sewall (1729-1796) in Cambridge, Massachusetts. He joined the law office of John Pickering (1737 - 1805) in Portsmouth, New Hampshire in the early 1770s. In 1774 he became register of probate in Grafton County, New Hampshire but resigned the following year. His ode, War and Washington which was written when British troops occupied Boston in 1775 was celebrated and sung in the Revolutionary War. A volume of his poems was published in 1801.).He died in Portsmouth, New Hampshire on March 29, 1808.
