= Codman House =

Historic house in Massachusetts, United States

- The Grange
- U.S. National Register of Historic Places
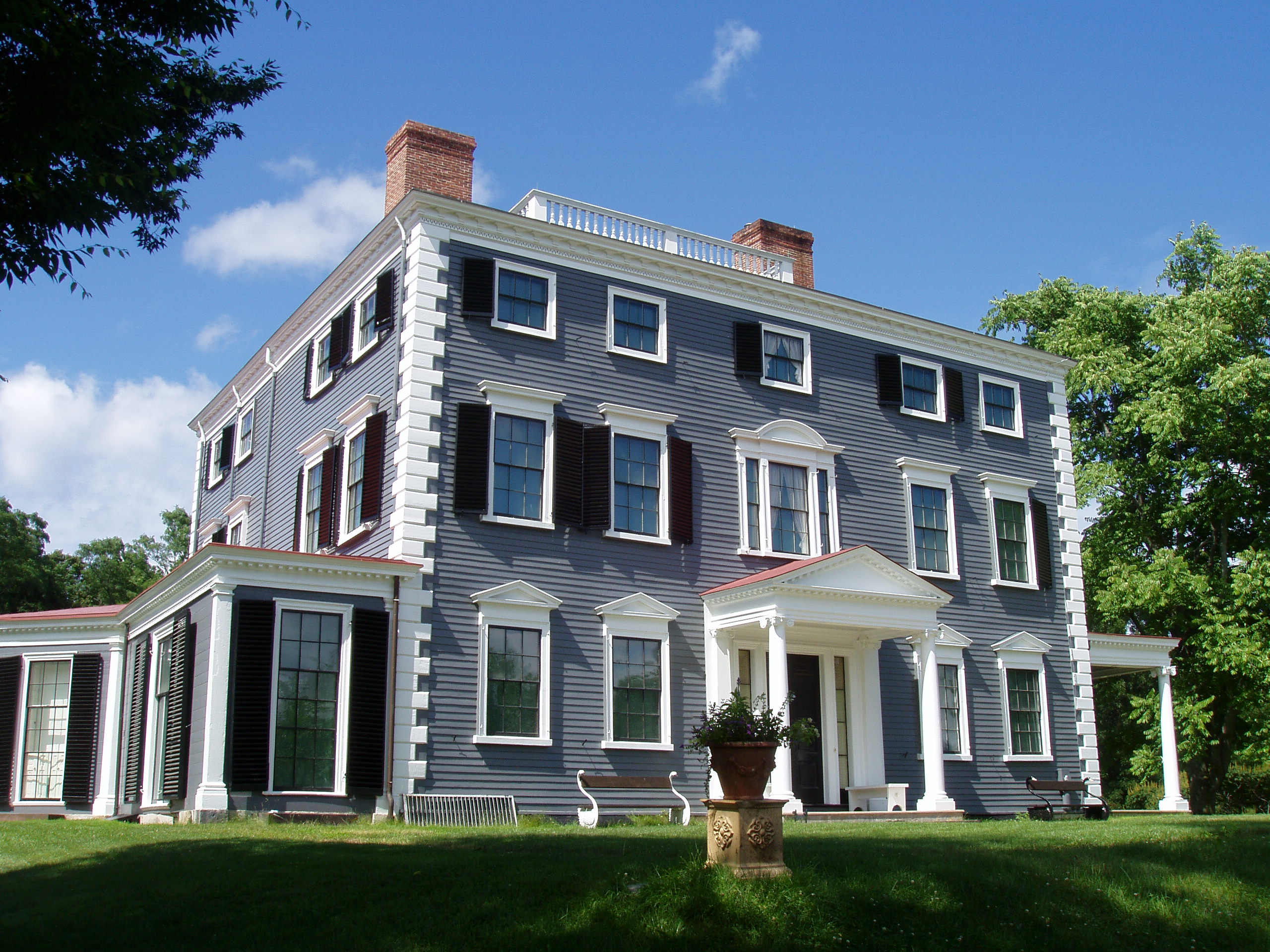
- Codman Estate

- Location within Massachusetts Location within the United States
- Location: 36 Codman Rd. Lincoln, Massachusetts
- Coordinates: 42°25′2″N 71°19′52″W
- Area: 16 acres (6.5 ha)
- Built: c. 1740
- Architect: Charles Bulfinch; John Hubbard Sturgis
- Architectural style: Georgian, Federal
- NRHP reference No.: 74000373
- Added to NRHP: April 18, 1974

The Codman House (also known as The Grange) is a historic house set on a 16-acre (6.5 ha) estate at 36 Codman Road, Lincoln, Massachusetts. Thanks to a gift by Dorothy Codman, it has been owned by Historic New England since 1969 and is open to the public June 1–October 15 on the second and fourth Saturdays of the month. An admission fee is charged.

The main house was originally Georgian in style and was built in approximately 1735 by Chambers Russell, the de facto founder of Lincoln, Massachusetts. It was enlarged in the 1790s to its current three-story Federal style by John Codman, brother-in-law of Chambers Russell III and executor of his estate. This was perhaps with some involvement of noted American architect Charles Bulfinch. The interior is extensively furnished with portraits, memorabilia, and art works collected in Europe. Various rooms preserve the decorative schemes of every era, including those of noted interior designer Ogden Codman, Jr.

The former carriage house, built c. 1870 to a design by Snell & Gregerson, is also located on the property. Until the 1980s, it was original to its use as a stable and an early auto garage and contained many artifacts of both. A few of those artifacts continue to be on display in the carriage house including an early gas pump and a large machine powered lathe.

The grounds have been farmed almost continuously since 1735 and now also include an Italian garden, circa 1899, with perennial beds, statuary, and a reflecting pool filled with waterlilies, as well as an English cottage garden, circa 1930.

The Codman Estate was added to the National Register of Historic Places as "The Grange" in 1974.

== See also ==
- National Register of Historic Places listings in Middlesex County, Massachusetts
