= War and Washington =

Song by Jonathan M. Sewall

- by Jonathan M. Sewall
- Genre: Marching song
- Melody: The British Grenadiers
- Performed: Between 1775 and 1783

War and Washington was a song written during the American Revolution by Jonathan M. Sewall. To be sung to the tune of The British Grenadiers the verses are:

Vain Britons, boast no longer with proud indignity,
By land your conquering legions, your matchless strength by sea.
Since we, your sons incensed, our swords have girded on.
Huzza! huzza! huzza! huzza, for War and Washington!

Still deaf to mild entreaties, still blind to England's good,
You have for thirty pieces betray'd your country's blood.
Like Esop's cur you'll gain but a shadow for your bone,
Yet find us fearful shades indeed, inspired by Washington.

Mysterious! unexampled!, incomprehensible!
The blustering schemes of Britain, your downfall will foretell,
Like lions roar and grumble, mere asses have you shown,
And ye shall share an ass's fate, and drudge for Washington!

Yet think not thirst of glory unsheaths our vengeful swords,
To rend your bands asunder, and cast away your cords.
'Tis heaven-born freedom fires us all, and strengthens each brave son,
From him who humbly guides the plough, to godlike Washington.

Fired with that great idea, our fathers' shades would rise;
To view the stern contention, the gods desert their skies.
And Wolfe, 'mid hosts of heroes, superior bending down,
Cry out with eager transport, well done brave Washington!

Your dark, unfathom'd counsels our weakest heads defeat,
Our children rout your armies, our boats destroy your fleet,
And to complete the dire disgrace, coop'd up within a town,
You live, the scorn of all our host, the slaves of Washington!

Great heaven! is this the nation whose thundering arms were hurl'd,
Through Europe, Afric, India? whose navy ruled a world?
The lustre of your former deeds, whole ages of renown,
Lost in a moment, or transferred to us and Washington!

For this, Oh could our wishes your ancient rage inspire,
Your armies should be doubled, in numbers, force, and fire.
Then might the glorious conflict prove which best deserved the boon,
America, or Albion; a George, or Washington!

Should George, too choice of Britons, to foreign realms apply,
And madly arm half Europe, yet still we would defy
Turk, Hessian, Jew, and Infidel, or all those powers in one,
While Adams guides our senate, our camp great Washington!

Should warlike weapons fail us, disdaining slavish fears,
To swords we'll beat our ploughshares, our pruninghooks to spears,
And rush, all desperate! on our foe, nor breathe till battle won;
Then shout, and shout America! and conquering Washington!

Proud France should view with terror, and haughty Spain revere,
While every warlike nation would court alliance here.
And George, his minions trembling round, dismounting from his throne,
Pay homage to America, and glorious Washington!

— George Washington's Mount Vernon, The Music of Washington's World series.
