= Mill pond =

Body of water used as a reservoir for a water-powered mill

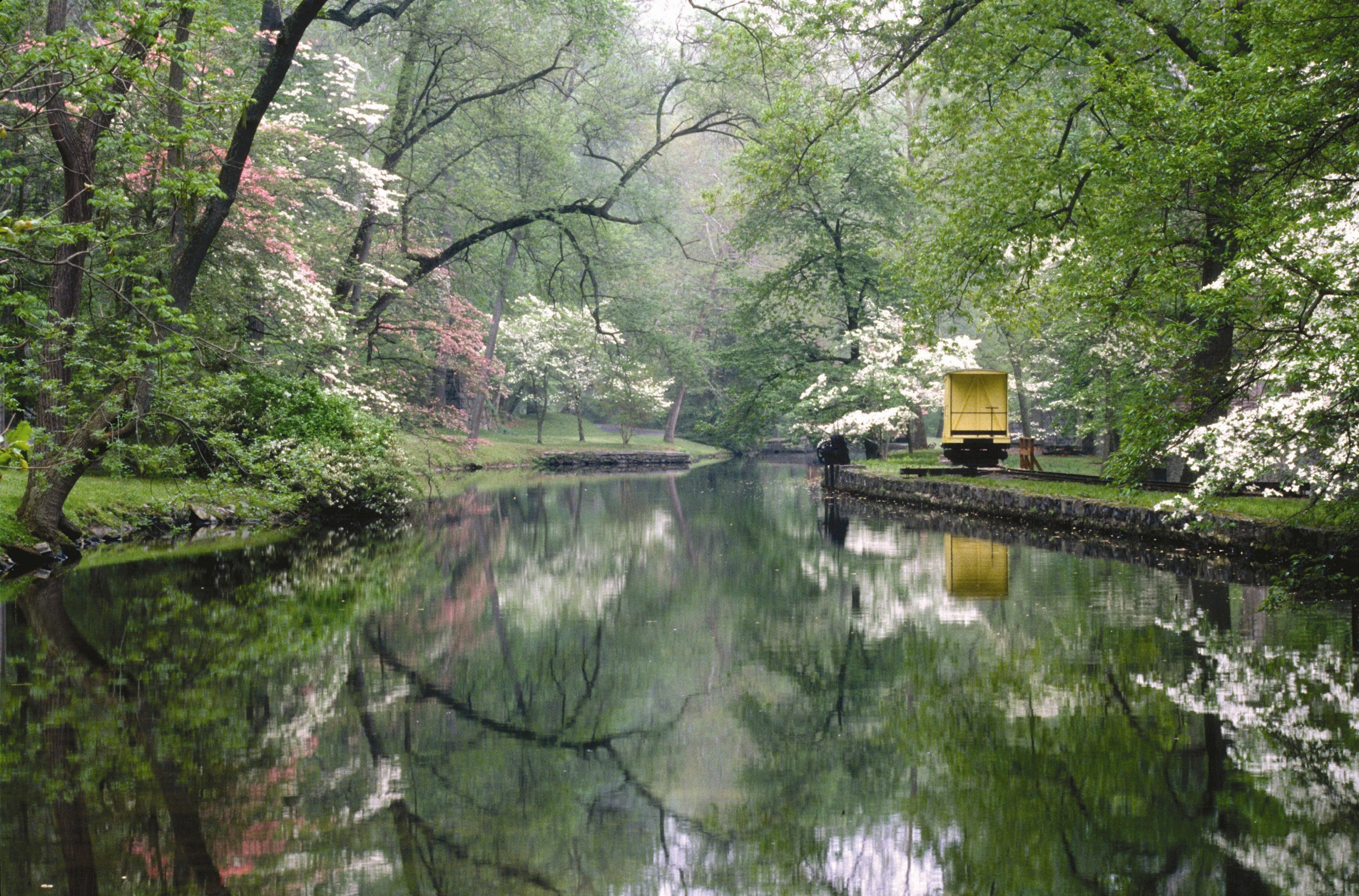
Hagley mill pond on Brandywine Creek in Delaware which fed the mill race powering the gunpowder mills owned by DuPont, historical armaments supplier in the U.S.

A mill pond (or millpond) is a body of water used as a reservoir for a water-powered mill.

== Description ==
Mill ponds were often created through the construction of a mill dam or weir (and mill stream) across a waterway.

In many places, the common proper name Mill Pond has remained even though the mill has long since gone. It may be fed by a man-made stream, known by several terms including leat and mill stream. The channel or stream leading from the mill pond is the mill race, which together with weirs, dams, channels and the terrain establishing the mill pond, delivers water to the mill wheel to convert potential and/or kinetic energy of the water to mechanical energy by rotating the mill wheel. The production of mechanical power is the purpose of this civil engineering hydraulic system.

The term mill pond is often used colloquially and in literature to refer to a very flat body of water. Witnesses of the loss of RMS Titanic reported that the sea was "like a mill pond".

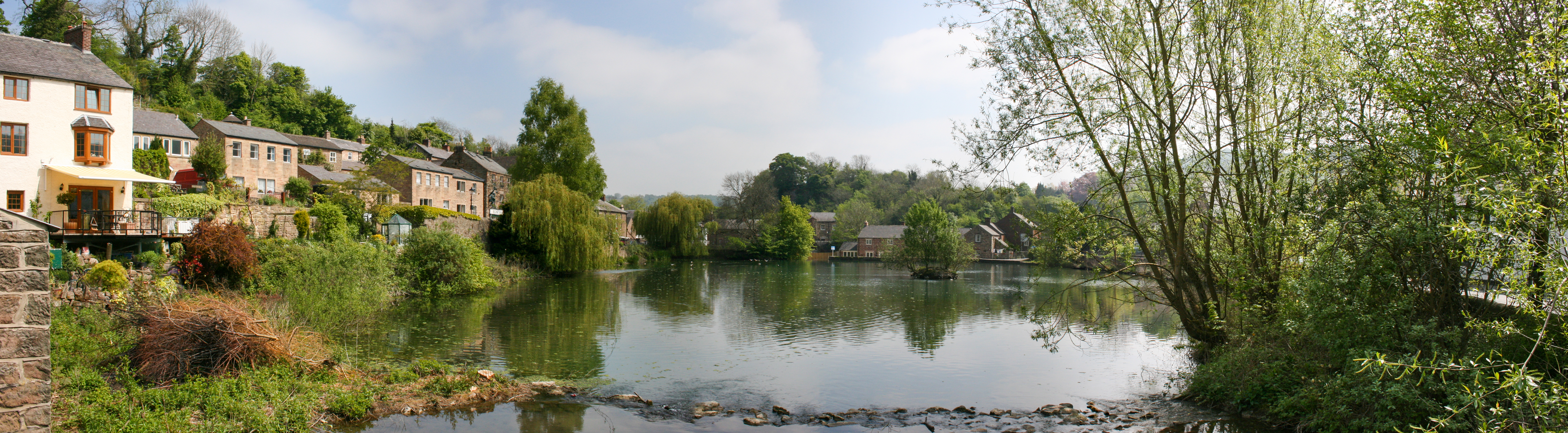
Panorama of Cromford mill pond at Cromford, Derbyshire, England

== Footnotes and references ==
=== References ===
- mill pond. Dictionary.com. Dictionary.com Unabridged. Random House, Inc. http://dictionary.com/browse/mill pond (accessed: September 7, 2013).
- mill pond. Dictionary.com. Collins English Dictionary - Complete & Unabridged 10th Edition. HarperCollins Publishers. http://dictionary.com/browse/mill pond (accessed: September 7, 2013).
- leat. Dictionary.com. Collins English Dictionary - Complete & Unabridged 10th Edition. HarperCollins Publishers. http://dictionary.com/browse/leat (accessed: September 7, 2013).
