= Flints Pond =

Body of water in Lincoln, Massachusetts, United States

- Sandy Pond
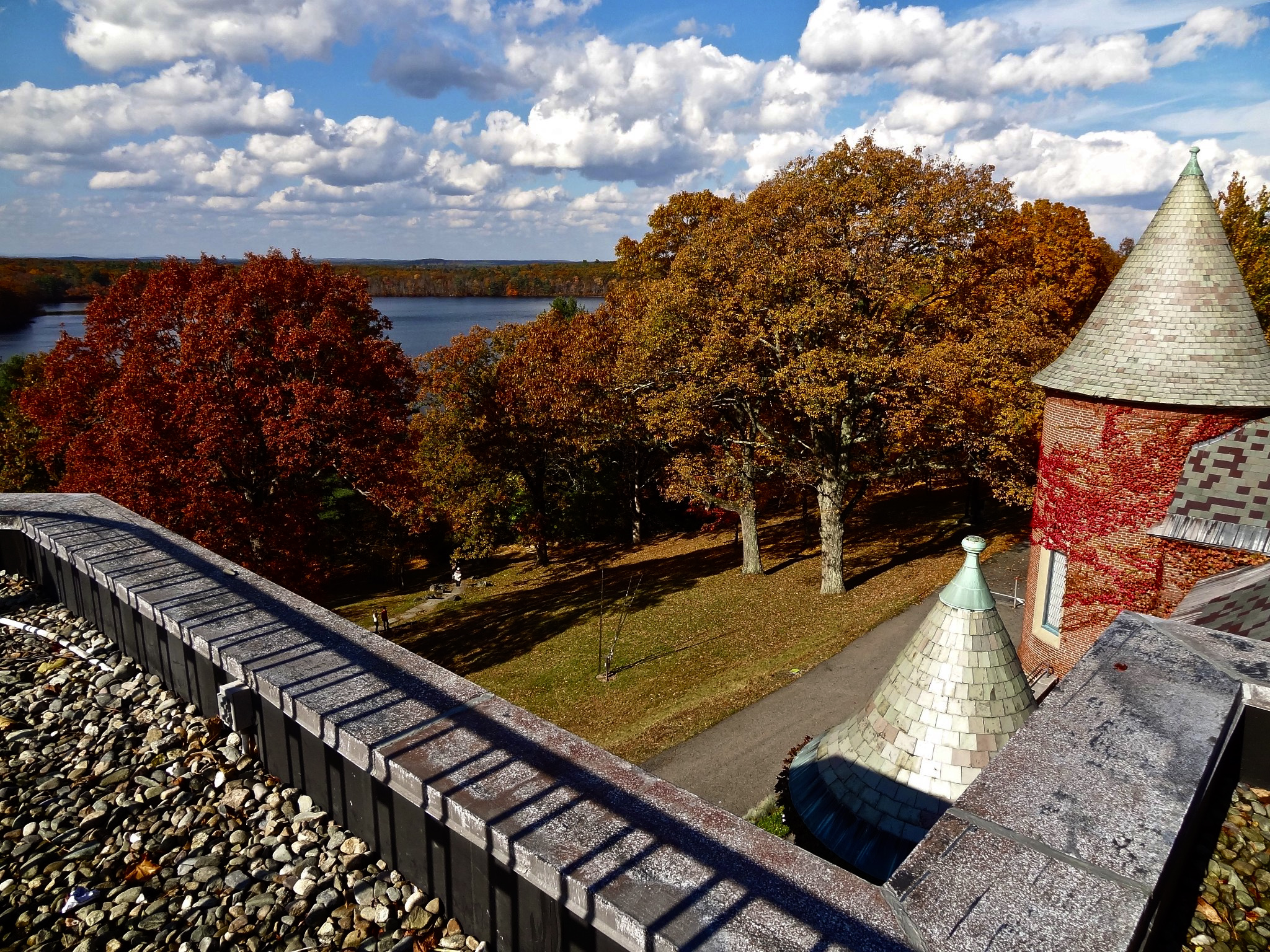
- A view of the pond from the roof of the DeCordova Museum

- Location within Massachusetts Location within the United States
- Location: Middlesex County, Massachusetts
- Coordinates: 42.43532925°N 71.3147677°W
- Primary outflows: Mill Brook, Stony Brook
- Basin countries: United States
- Settlements: Lincoln, Massachusetts

Flints Pond (or Flint's Pond; also known as Sandy Pond) is a body of water in Lincoln, Massachusetts, United States. Named for Flint House, on the land of which it was situated, it is the town's major water supply, with Tower Road Well being the supplemental source.

The pond is located around 1.15 miles (1.85 km) north-northwest of Lincoln's town centre. The DeCordova Sculpture Park and Museum, built on the former estate of Julian de Cordova, sits on the southern shores of the pond. The pond is passed by State Route 2 around 0.5 miles (0.80 km) to the north.

One of its outflows is Mill Brook, noted for its connection to the battles of Lexington and Concord.

== History ==
The land around the pond was used by European settlers for their source of food.

After Thoreau's time at Walden Pond, a mile to the west, Sandy Pond was renamed back to Flints Pond at the request of the Flint family. Henry David Thoreau's college classmate Charles Stearns Wheeler built a hut at Flints Pond in 1836. He lived there during his vacations over the following six years, with Thoreau being a guest during the first year. Thoreau asked for permission to build a cabin on the pond, but the Flint family denied his request due to his accidentally having caused a fire near Fairhaven Bay.

Local residents purchased a parcel of land beside the pond in 1958 to prevent development on it occurring. The Lincoln Land Conservation Trust was thus formed. There is now a water-supply protection zone surrounding the pond. Its watershed consists of 445 acres (180 ha), of which the Town of Lincoln owns around 92 percent, as of 2023.
