= Milldam (Concord, Massachusetts) =

Town in Massachusetts

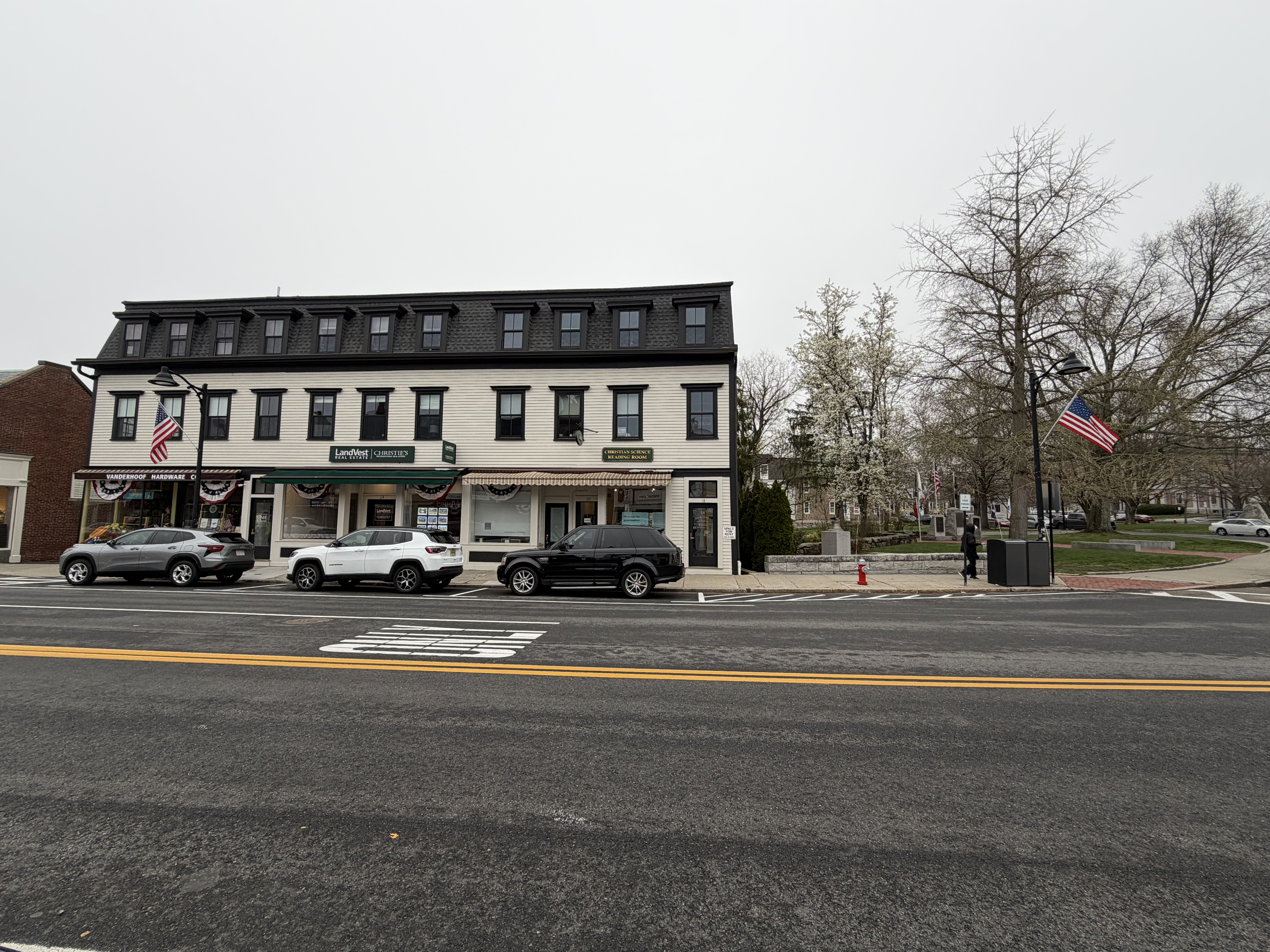
The Milldam in 2026

The Milldam was a dam which formerly blocked Mill Brook in Concord, Massachusetts, United States, near the intersection of today's Main Street and Monument Square.

Originally the site of an American Indian fishing weir, in 1635, English settlers established a village beside lower Mill Brook, with a dam, pond and mill being built the following year at the Milldam. A road (Main Street) was built across the dam in 1742. Before 1739, a diversion of water between Elm Brook and Mill Brook occurred.

The Milldam pond was drained in 1828, with the dam and mill buildings demolished. Main Street was widened shortly thereafter and covered in crushed stone by the early 1880s.
