= Stephen Sewall =

American judge

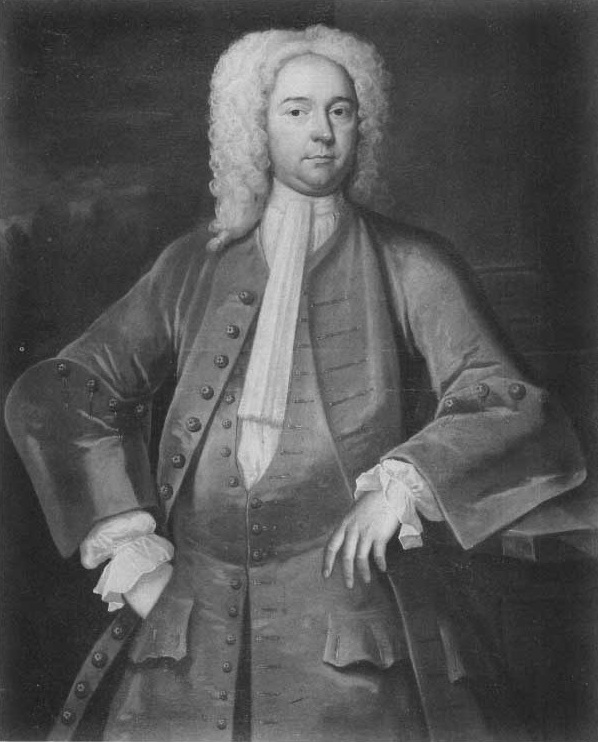
- Portrait by Benjamin Feke (c. 1755)

Chief Justice of the Massachusetts Superior Court of Judicature
- In office 1752–1760
- Appointed by: William Shirley
- Preceded by: Paul Dudley
- Succeeded by: Thomas Hutchinson

Associate Justice of the Massachusetts Superior Court of Judicature
- In office 1739–1752
- Appointed by: Jonathan Belcher
- Preceded by: Thomas Graves
- Succeeded by: Chambers Russell

Personal details
- Born: December 13, 1702 Salem, Massachusetts
- Died: September 10, 1760 (aged 57) Boston, Massachusetts
- Education: Harvard University

Stephen Sewall (December 14, 1702 – September 10, 1760) was a judge in colonial Massachusetts. Born in Salem, Massachusetts, he was the son of Stephen Sewall, the clerk of court at the Salem witchcraft trials, and a nephew of Chief Justice Samuel Sewall, who presided at the witchcraft trials. He was the uncle of lawyer Jonathan Sewall and of the poet, lawyer and patriot, Jonathan Mitchell Sewall of Portsmouth, NH.

He attended Harvard University, graduating in 1721. Although never formally trained as a lawyer or admitted to the bar, he was appointed first as an associate justice, and then as Chief Justice of the Massachusetts Superior Court of Judicature, the highest court in the colony. He also served on the Massachusetts Governor's Council, which was then the upper house of the Massachusetts General Court. He was generally respected by both friends (the "court party") and foes (the "popular party") of royal government.

Sewall's death in Boston in 1760 was followed by controversy. James Otis, Jr. believed that his father, James Otis, Sr., had been promised the office of chief justice, but Governor Francis Bernard appointed Crown supporter Thomas Hutchinson instead, creating a political rift that would have important implications in the development of the American Revolution. While Sewall had expressed doubts about the legality of writs of assistance, which were controversial general search warrants, Hutchinson authorized them—over the objections of Otis—in the famous "writs of assistance case" of 1761.

Legal offices
Preceded by Thomas Graves	Associate Justice of the Massachusetts Superior Court of Judicature; 1739–1752	Succeeded by Chambers Russell
Preceded by Paul Dudley	Chief Justice of the Massachusetts Superior Court of Judicature; 1752–1760	Succeeded by Thomas Hutchinson
