= Lincoln, Massachusetts =

- Town
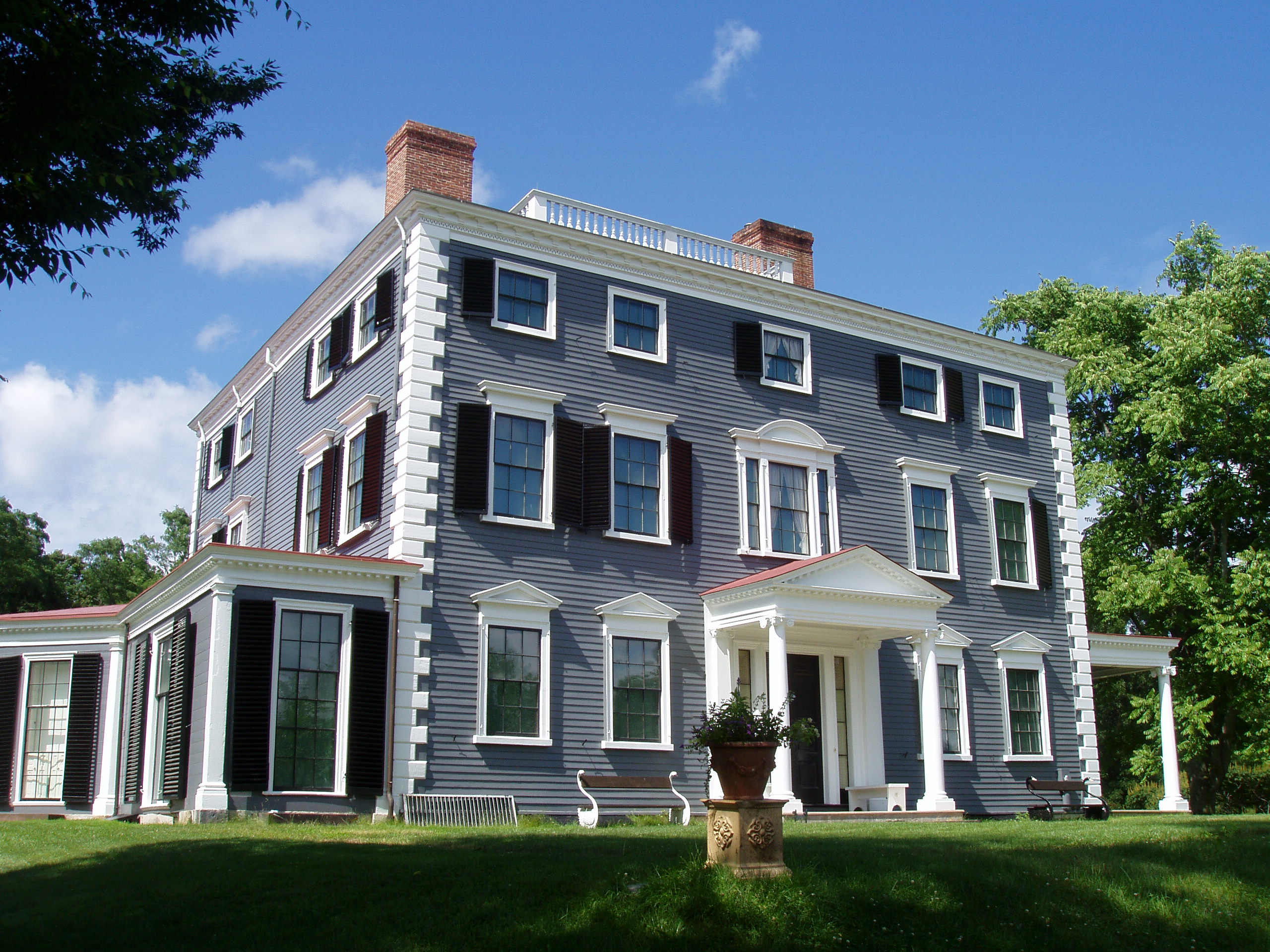
- Codman House

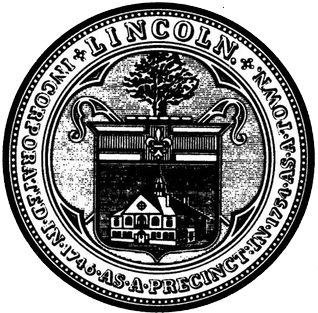
- Seal

- Location in Middlesex County in Massachusetts
- Coordinates: 42°25′33″N 71°18′16″W
- Country: United States
- State: Massachusetts
- County: Middlesex
- Settled: 1650
- Incorporated: 1754

Government
  - Type: Open town meeting
  - Town Administrator: Timothy Higgins

Area
  - Total: 15.0 sq mi (38.9 km^{2})
  - Land: 14.4 sq mi (37.2 km^{2})
  - Water: 0.66 sq mi (1.7 km^{2})
- Elevation: 259 ft (79 m)

Population (2020)
  - Total: 7,014
  - Density: 488/sq mi (188.5/km^{2})
- Time zone: UTC−5 (Eastern)
  - Summer (DST): UTC−4 (Eastern)
- ZIP Codes: 01773 (Lincoln); 01731 (Hanscom AFB)
- Area code: 339/781
- FIPS code: 25-35425
- GNIS feature ID: 0619402
- Website: www.lincolntown.org

Lincoln is a town in Middlesex County, Massachusetts, United States. The population was 7,014 according to the 2020 United States census, including residents of Hanscom Air Force Base who live within town limits. The town, located in the MetroWest region of Boston's suburbs, has a large amount of colonial history and a sizeable amount of public conservation land.

== History ==
Lincoln was settled by Europeans in 1654, as a part of Concord. The majority of Lincoln was formed by splitting off a substantial piece of southeast Concord and incorporated as a separate town in 1754. Due to their "difficulties and inconveniences by reason of their distance from the places of Public Worship in their respective Towns," local inhabitants petitioned the General Court to be set apart as a separate town. Because the new town was composed of parts "nipped" off from the adjacent towns of Concord, Weston (which itself had been part of Watertown) and Lexington (which itself had been part of Cambridge), it was sometimes referred to as "Niptown."

Chambers Russell, a Representative in the Court in Boston, was influential in the town's creation. In gratitude, Russell was asked to name the new town. He chose Lincoln, after his family home in Lincolnshire, England. His homestead in Lincoln was later known as the Codman House property, which was occupied after his death by his relatives, the Codman family.

Lincoln is one of the few American towns named after the county of Lincolnshire, England, and not the Revolutionary War Major General Benjamin Lincoln or President Abraham Lincoln.

Paul Revere was captured by British soldiers in Lincoln on the night of April 18, 1775. Minutemen from Lincoln were the first to arrive to reinforce the colonists protecting American stores of ammunition and arms in Concord. Colonel Abijah Pierce of Lincoln led his troops, armed with a cane. He upgraded his weapon to a British musket after the battle. Five British soldiers who fell in Lincoln are buried in the town cemetery. A substantial portion of the first battle of the Revolutionary War, the battles of Lexington and Concord, was fought in Lincoln.

Reverend Charles Stearns, a Harvard-trained minister, served the Congregational Church in Lincoln from late 1781 until his death 45 years later.

== Education ==
The Lincoln School District operates elementary and middle schools, while the zoned high school is Lincoln-Sudbury Regional High School, in Sudbury, of the school district of that name.

Lincoln's non-base area is home to one public K–8 school, the Lincoln School. In December 2018, voters in Lincoln approved the construction of a new K–8 school building and a Proposition 2 1/2 property tax override to pay for the school. To date $80 million financing has been raised via bond issuance for a $93.9 million renovation project at Lincoln School.

The on-post K–8 Hanscom School of Hanscom Air Force Base, a base which is partially in Lincoln, is operated the Lincoln School District. Dependents of active duty military living on the base are sent to Bedford High School of the Bedford School District. High school students living on the base who are not dependents of active duty military personnel are sent to Lincoln-Sudbury Regional High.

The private school The Carroll School maintains its middle school in Lincoln.

== Geography ==
Lincoln has a total area of 15.0 square miles (39 km^{2}), of which 14.4 square miles (37 km^{2}) is land and 0.6 square miles (1.6 km^{2}) is water, representing 4.26% of the town's total area. (Source: United States Census Bureau.)

== Demographics ==
Historical population
Year	Pop.	±%
1790	740	—
1850	719	−2.8%
1860	718	−0.1%
1870	791	+10.2%
1880	907	+14.7%
1890	987	+8.8%
1900	1,127	+14.2%
1910	1,175	+4.3%
1920	1,042	−11.3%
1930	1,493	+43.3%
1940	1,783	+19.4%
1950	2,427	+36.1%
1960	5,613	+131.3%
1970	7,567	+34.8%
1980	7,098	−6.2%
1990	7,666	+8.0%
2000	8,056	+5.1%
2010	6,362	−21.0%
2020	7,014	+10.2%
2022*	6,855	−2.3%
* = population estimate. Source: United States census records and Population Estimates Program data.

At the 2020 census, there were 7,014 people residing in the town. The racial makeup of the town was 76.2% White, 3.2% African American, 0.2% Native American, 6.4% Asian, 0.2% Pacific Islander, 1.0% from other races, and 5.6% from two or more races. Hispanic or Latino of any race were 7.3% of the population. The 21.03% drop in population between the 2010 and 2000 censuses was the largest of any municipality in Massachusetts. Diversity in the public schools is higher due to the METCO program.

The majority of the land in the town is zoned for residential and agricultural use.

== Media ==
=== Newspapers ===
Lincoln was formerly served by the Lincoln Journal, a newspaper (not to be confused with the Lincoln Journal Star, a newspaper in Nebraska). The Lincoln Journal, which eventually came under the ownership of GateHouse Media, merged with the nearby Concord Journal in 2019. Prior to the merger, the newspaper had gone without any full time staff for several years, becoming a ghost newspaper.

During the 1950s and 1960s, the Fence Viewer was published, a newspaper which covered the town in addition to neighboring Sudbury. The Concord Journal covered the town until the Lincoln Journal was created as a dedicated local paper for the town.

Lincoln is served by the Lincoln Squirrel, a news website created by Alice Waugh. The Squirrel also hosts the Lincoln Review, an online magazine, on its website. The Lincoln Review previously operated as a print magazine until 2019. It was rebranded the Lincoln Chipmunk and became an online publication hosted by the Squirrel in 2020 before going back to its original name in 2024.

== Points of interest ==
- Arborvitae Cemetery
- Bemis Hall
- Codman House
- DeCordova Sculpture Park and Museum
- Drumlin Farm
- The Food Project
- Gropius House
- Hanscom Field and Hanscom Air Force Base
- Hartwell Tavern
- Hunt–Rice Tavern
- Lincoln Center Historic District
- Lincoln Public Library
- Massachusetts Audubon Society Headquarters
- Mount Misery
- Ponyhenge
- Virginia Road

== Transportation ==
Commuter rail service from Boston's North Station is provided by the MBTA with a stop in Lincoln on its Fitchburg Line. Lincoln was previously home to a second railroad station, Baker Bridge station, which was the site of a deadly 1905 train wreck.

== In popular culture ==
- The 1988 They Might Be Giants album Lincoln is named after the town, as it is the hometown of both of the band's founding members.
- Lincoln is featured in the 2013 video game The Last of Us, as well as the 2023 HBO television adaption, although the game indicates that Lincoln is part of Amherst County, which does not exist; the real Amherst is a town approximately 75 miles (120 kilometers) west of Lincoln.

== Notable people ==
- Bradford Cannon, pioneer in reconstructive surgery
- Holly Clarke, distance runner
- Collin Graf, NHL player
- David Herbert Donald, professor and Pulitzer Prize-winning Author
- Susan Fargo, Massachusetts state senator
- John Farrar, Harvard scientist
- John Flansburgh, musician, co-founder of the alternative rock group They Might Be Giants
- Miriam Sophie Freud, Austrian American psychosociologist, educator, and author, the granddaughter of Sigmund Freud
- Julia Glass, author
- Diana Golden, ski racer
- Harriet Louise Hardy, first woman professor at Harvard Medical School
- Mary Hartwell, who played a prominent role in the battles of Lexington and Concord
- Maggie Hassan, Senator, New Hampshire Governor
- Greg Hawkes, keyboardist for The Cars
- David Hunter Hubel FRS (1926–2013), neurophysiologist and Nobel prizewinner
- Charles Kindleberger, economic historian and author
- John Linnell, musician, co-founder of the alternative rock group They Might Be Giants
- Martin Nowak, scientist
- Joan Risch, housewife who disappeared from her home in Lincoln in 1961 under mysterious circumstances
- Nicholi Rogatkin, professional cyclist
- Joseph M. Sussman, MIT professor
- Ray Tomlinson, computer programming pioneer, inventor of e-mail
- Lester Thurow, Dean of MIT Sloan School, author
- Patricia Warner, spy for OSS during World War II
- Charles Stearns Wheeler, Transcendentalism pioneer
- Alex Taylor, distance runner
- Frank Wood, actor
- Robert Coldwell Wood, political scientist

== See also ==
- Beaver Pond
- Flints Pond
