= Samuel Gray Ward =

American private banker

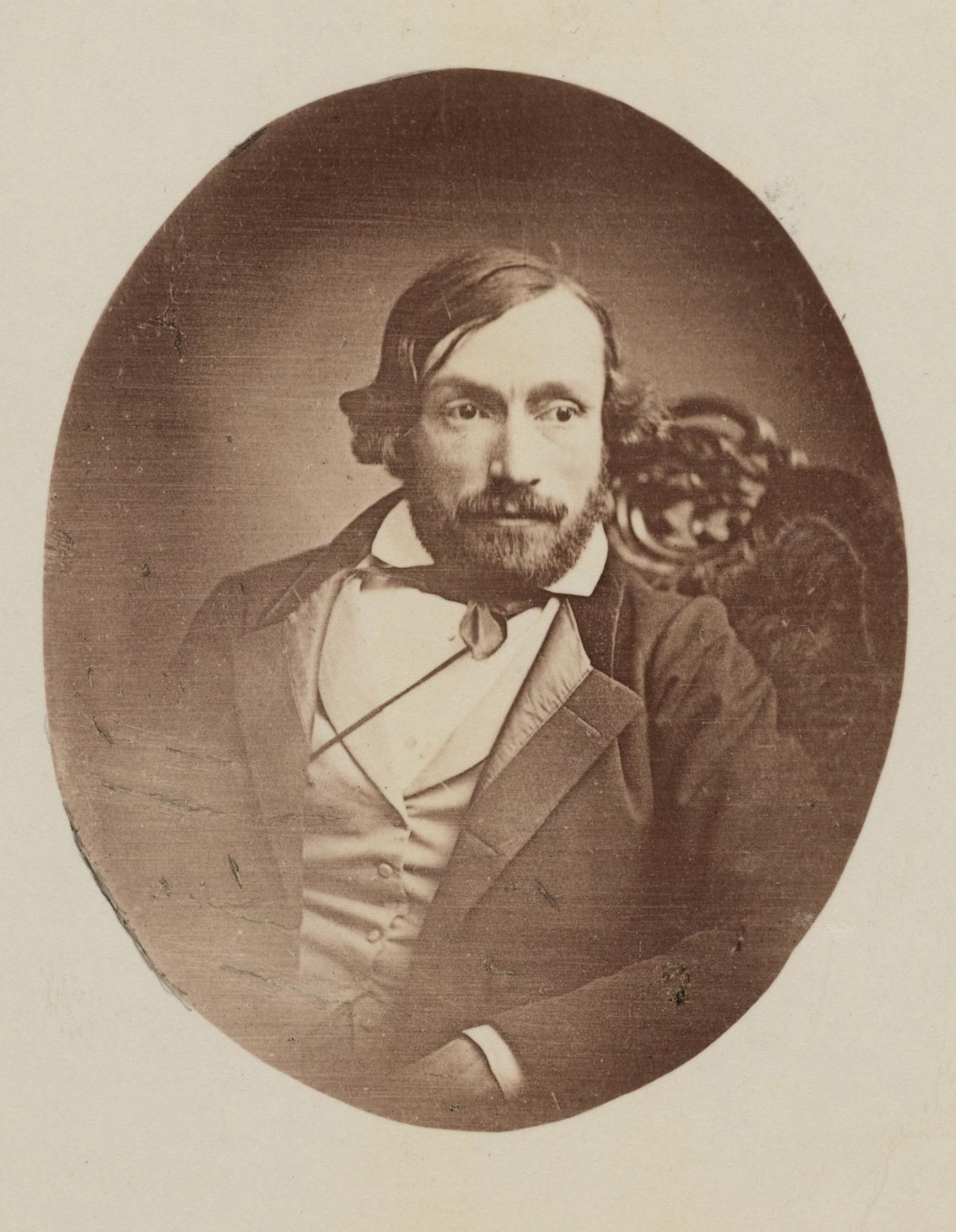
- Born: October 3, 1817; Portland, Maine, U.S.
- Died: November 17, 1907 (aged 90); Washington, D.C., U.S.
- Education: Harvard College
- Occupations: Writer, banker
- Spouse: Anna Hazard Barker (m. 1840; died 1900)
- Children: 4
- Parent(s): Thomas Wren Ward; Lydia Gray

Samuel Gray Ward (October 3, 1817 – November 17, 1907) was an American poet, author, and minor member of the Transcendentalism movement. He was also a banker and a co-founder of the Metropolitan Museum of Art. Among his circle of contemporaries were poets and writers such as Ralph Waldo Emerson and Margaret Fuller who were deeply disappointed when Ward gave up a career in writing for business just before he married.

== Early life ==
Ward was born on October 3, 1817, in Portland, Maine. He was the son of Lydia Gray (1789–1874) and Thomas Wren Ward (1786–1858), who served as treasurer of Harvard from 1830 to 1842 and was the American agent for London-based Baring Brothers & Co., merchant bank. His brother was George Cabot Ward.

Ward attended Harvard College and graduated along with Transcendentalist poet Jones Very, though the two were not friends. As a student, he boarded for a time with Professor John Farrar and his wife Eliza Ware Farrar. He joined the Farrars on a trip to Europe in the summer of 1836, though he broke from them for private travels to England, Paris, and Rome, before rejoining them in the Swiss Alps by August 1837.

== Career ==
Ward became associated with Ralph Waldo Emerson and began contributing to the Transcendentalist journal The Dial, which published four of his poems in its inaugural issue. Emerson reflected on meeting him: "Beautiful among so many ordinary & mediocre youths as I see, was S. G. W. when I first fairly encountered him". Emerson particularly relied on Ward to inform him about art criticism; he wrote to Ward in 1838 that he was "especially curious of information on art & artists, of which however, I warn you, I know nothing." Emerson seemed particularly taken by the young man, writing to Ellery Channing in January 1840, "your friend Samuel G. Ward, whom though I have known but a little while I love much". A few months later, he told Ward, "I... wish you to love me".

When Ellery Channing published his book of poems, Ward subsidized its printing. Emerson edited the project but told Ward that Channing "goes to the very end of the poetic license, and defies a little too disdainfully his dictionary and logic". Critic Edgar Allan Poe agreed and noted in his review of Channing's book that it was "full of all kinds of mistakes, of which the most important is that of their having been written at all". After Margaret Fuller's death in 1850, Emerson attempted to persuade Ward into writing her biography, though he declined. "How can you describe a Force? How can you write the life of Margaret?" he asked.

Thanks to an inheritance from his father as well as his own business dealings, Ward became the wealthiest person among the Transcendentalist circle, though he did not pursue literature for long. Though Emerson chose four of his poems for his 1874 compilation Parnassus, Ward had stopped writing new poetry since his contributions to The Dial.

== Personal life ==
In 1840, Ward married Anna Hazard Barker (1813–1900), to the disappointment of their mutual friend Margaret Fuller. Barker's father, New York State Senator Jacob Barker (1779–1871), hired Ward to work as a banker, which Fuller worried removed him from a more aesthetic life. Ward had chosen such a career out of concern for proving he could support his soon to be wife. Fuller expressed her disappointment over Ward's decision in a letter to him, "I will confess, once and for all, I had longed to see you a painter... and not a merchant... when I learned you were to become a merchant, to sit at the dead wood of the desk, and calculate figures, I was betrayed into unbelief." Emerson was equally disappointed and wrote to fellow Transcendentalist Caroline Sturgis Tappan that the news affected him "with a certain terror" and he concluded that "happiness is so vulgar". Though he chose to pursue a career in business Ward continued to correspond with his friends in the Transcendentalist movement through the remainder of his life.

Ward and Barker eventually had four children: three daughters and a son:

- Anna Barker Ward (1841–1875), who married Joseph Marie Antoine Thoron, a French merchant, and died shortly after giving birth to her son, Ward Thoron.
- Lydia Gray "Lily" Ward (b. 1843), who married German Baron Richard von Hoffman in 1870.
- Thomas Wren Ward (1844–1940), who married Sophia Read Howard, a descendant of Gov. George Howard, in 1872.
- Elizabeth Barker "Bessie" Ward (1847–1920), who married Austrian Baron Ernst Augustus Schönberg-Roth-Schönberg (1850–1924) and lived at his castle, Schloss Pallaus, in South Tyrol.

For a time, the family kept a summer house in Lenox, Massachusetts, where a young Emma Lazarus would sometimes join them with her family. That home, built on land purchased in 1844, was named Oakwood and is an area now known as Shadow Brook Farm Historic District.

Ward died on November 17, 1907, in Washington, D.C.

=== Legacy ===
Ward was a founder of the Metropolitan Museum of Art in 1869, sat on the Board of Trustees from 1870 to 1889, and served as treasurer for a time. The institution now owns a bas-relief of Ward by Augustus Saint-Gaudens, who considered the work as one of his two best bas-reliefs.

=== Descendants ===
His granddaughter through his only son Thomas, Elizabeth Howard Ward (1873-1954) and Charles Bruen Perkins (1860-1929), a Harvard graduate who had studied architecture at the École des Beaux-Arts in Paris who was the son of Charles Callahan Perkins (1823–1886), in 1896.
