= Hunt–Rice Tavern =

Colonial building in Massachusetts

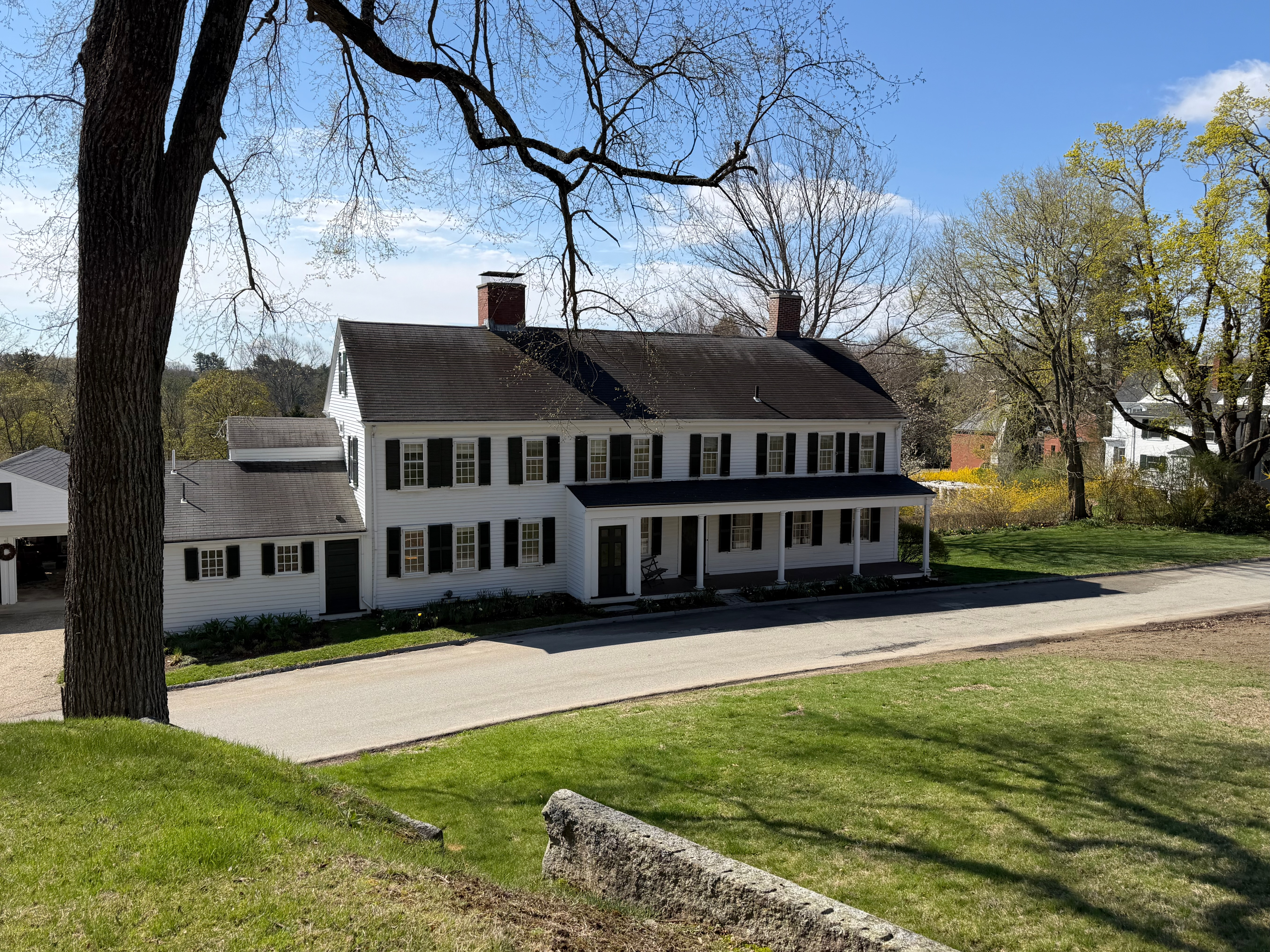
- Pictured in 2026, viewed from Town Hill Cemetery
- Interactive map of the Hunt–Rice Tavern area
- Alternative names: Poor House; Jonas Adams House

General information
- Location: Lincoln, Massachusetts, 7 Old Lexington Road
- Coordinates: 42.42699°N 71.30223°W
- Completed: c. 1785 (241 years ago)

The Hunt–Rice Tavern (also known as the Poor House and the Jonas Adams House) is a historic building in Lincoln, Massachusetts, United States. Located at 7 Old Lexington Road, immediately south of Bemis Hall and directly across the street from Town Hill Cemetery, the structure was completed around 1785.

The building was formerly the home of Robert Douglas Donaldson, a native Nova Scotian who became a prolific builder in Massachusetts.
