= Charles Stearns Wheeler =

American scholar and editor (1816–1843)

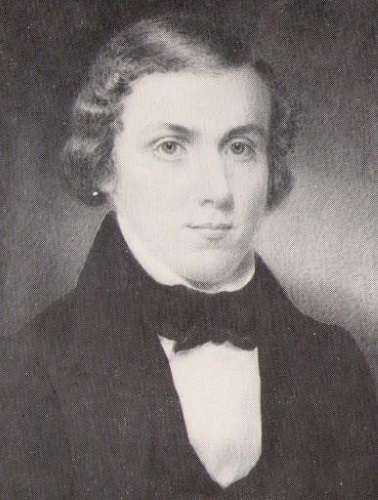
- Wheeler pictured around 1836
- Born: December 19, 1816; Lincoln, Massachusetts, U.S.
- Died: June 13, 1843 (aged 26); Leipzig, Germany
- Occupation: Gentleman farmer
- Parent(s): Charles Wheeler and Julia Stearns
- Relatives: Rev. Charles Stearns (grandfather)

Charles Stearns Wheeler (December 19, 1816 – June 13, 1843) was an American farmer and Transcendentalist pioneer. He is known as being one of the inspirations for Walden, the book published by his friend Henry David Thoreau in 1854.

== Life and career ==
Wheeler was born shortly before Christmas 1816 in Lincoln, Massachusetts, to Charles Wheeler and Julia Stearns. He was their fourth child, after Charles Wheeler in 1809, Julia Wheeler in 1810 and William Francis Wheeler in 1812. His grandfather, Reverend Charles Stearns, was pastor at Lincoln's Congregational Church for 45 years.

He attended Concord Academy and Harvard College. While at Harvard, he was a founding member of the A.D. Club, then known as an honorary chapter of Alpha Delta Phi fraternity.

In 1836, Wheeler built a shanty near Flints Pond. It was visited by Henry David Thoreau, his classmate at Concord and roommate at Harvard, who stayed there for much of the following summer, and was inspired to build his cabin at nearby Walden Pond. Charles Eliot Norton, a friend of Ralph Waldo Emerson and a Harvard classmate of Wheeler's, said of the duo's time at Flints Pond: Wheeler "introduced Thoreau to some of [nature's] intimacies to which he had not then attained".

In 1838, a year after graduating Harvard, Wheeler succeeded Jones Very as Greek tutor at Harvard Divinity School.

== Death ==
Wheeler died of gastric fever while in Leipzig, Germany, in 1843. He was 26. He was interred in Mount Auburn Cemetery in Cambridge, Massachusetts.
