= Robert Douglas Donaldson =

Canadian master builder

- Born: October 21, 1870; Tatamagouche, Nova Scotia, Canada
- Died: 1964 (aged 94)

Robert Douglas Donaldson (also known as R. D. Donaldson; October 21, 1870 – 1964) was a Canadian master builder who was prominent in the first half of the 20th century. During his time in Massachusetts, he became one of the state's most prolific builders.

== Early life ==
Donaldson was born in 1870 Tatamagouche, Nova Scotia, Canada, to David Donaldson and Flora Douglas. Without attaining a formal education, he emigrated south to Boston, Massachusetts, in his late teens, with farming and building experience. He worked as a farmhand in Acton.

== Career ==
Donaldson built his first house, in Lincoln, Massachusetts, in 1895. Located at 27 Tower Road, the house was constructed for William Pierce with plans purchased via a mail-order catalog. Later projects included moving Lincoln's Old Town Hall from beside today's First Parish Church to its location opposite the Town Offices Building on Lincoln Road. The Town Offices Building was completed by Donaldson in 1908. Many examples of Donaldsons handiwork are visible along the southern side of Trapelo Road, the main road in and out of Lincoln to and from the east. It is believed that he was responsible for the construction or alteration of around 100 buildings in Lincoln, with further examples existing in Cambridge, Brookline, Needham, Waltham and Concord. His work was mostly in the vernacular style. His prolific period ended around 1930, when "construction began employing machines and not men."

Donaldson and his family raised Guernsey cows at their Glendale Dairy until 1947, having purchased the land on Weston Road from John H. Pierce.

He served as a Selectman between 1913 and 1939, and also served on the Board of Health and the Cemetery Commission.

In 1942, Donaldson was the leader of Lincoln's First Parish Church when it was in the stone-built building on Bedford Road now serving as the Parish House. The Unitarians and Congregationalists merged around that time to form today's First Parish.

== Personal life ==
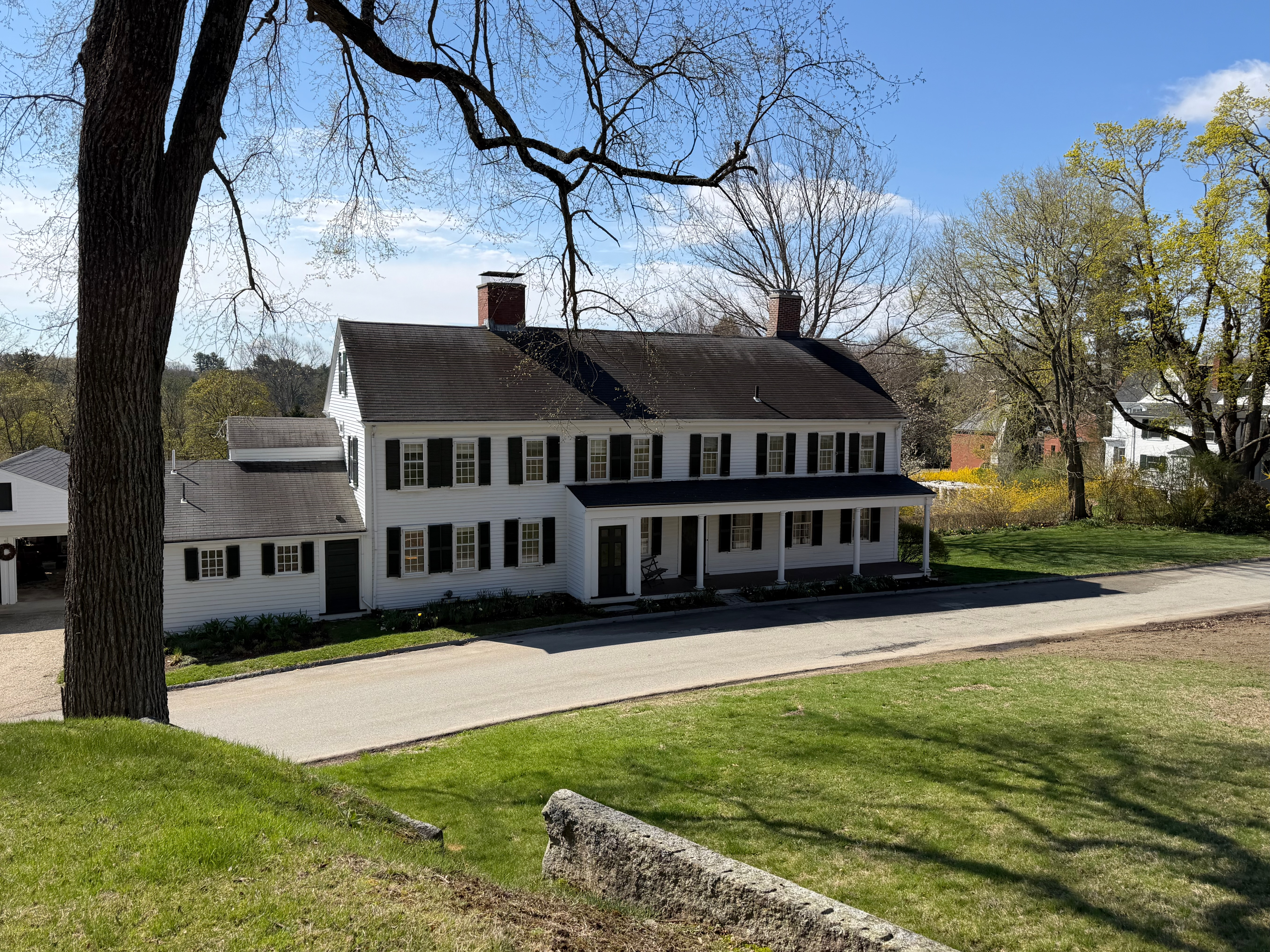
The Hunt–Rice Tavern, Donaldson's home in Lincoln, Massachusetts

Donaldson married Charlotte Henrietta Alcock in 1900, when he was living with his aunt in Somerville. Two years into their marriage, the Donaldsons purchased the Hunt–Rice Tavern in Lincoln, where they raised six children (four boys and two girls): Robert Jr., Malcolm, Donald, Gordon, Charlotte and Jean. His brother, James, also emigrated to Lincoln.

He was a Freemason.

== Death ==
Donaldson died in 1964, aged 94.
