= Old Meetinghouse (Lincoln, Massachusetts) =

Historic church in Massachusetts, United States

- A sketch of the church done from memory
- Old Meetinghouse
- 42.427474°N 71.303231°W
- Location: Bedford Road, Lincoln, Massachusetts, U.S.
- Denomination: Congregational

History
- Status: Demolished

Architecture
- Years built: 1747
- Closed: 1859

The Old Meetinghouse was a Congregational church which stood in Lincoln, Massachusetts, between 1747 and 1859. When it was completed, Lincoln was seven years away from being incorporated, having been part of Concord. It served as a venue for both religious and governmental meetings. Over 77 years, only two ministers served the church: the Reverend William Lawrence (for 31 years) and the Reverend Charles Stearns (for 45 years).

The meetinghouse was located just south of the Stone Church, at today's number 14 Bedford Road, which is now the Parish House. Its burial ground, Town Hill Cemetery, is located across Bedford Road, behind Bemis Hall. A third church, today's First Parish, is located a short distance to the south of the Parish House, opposite Lincoln Public Library. The meetinghouse burned down in 1859.

In 1942, the Unitarian and Congregationalists united after a century-long split to become today's First Parish.
