= Lincoln Center Historic District =

Historic district in Massachusetts, United States

- U.S. National Register of Historic Places
- U.S. Historic district
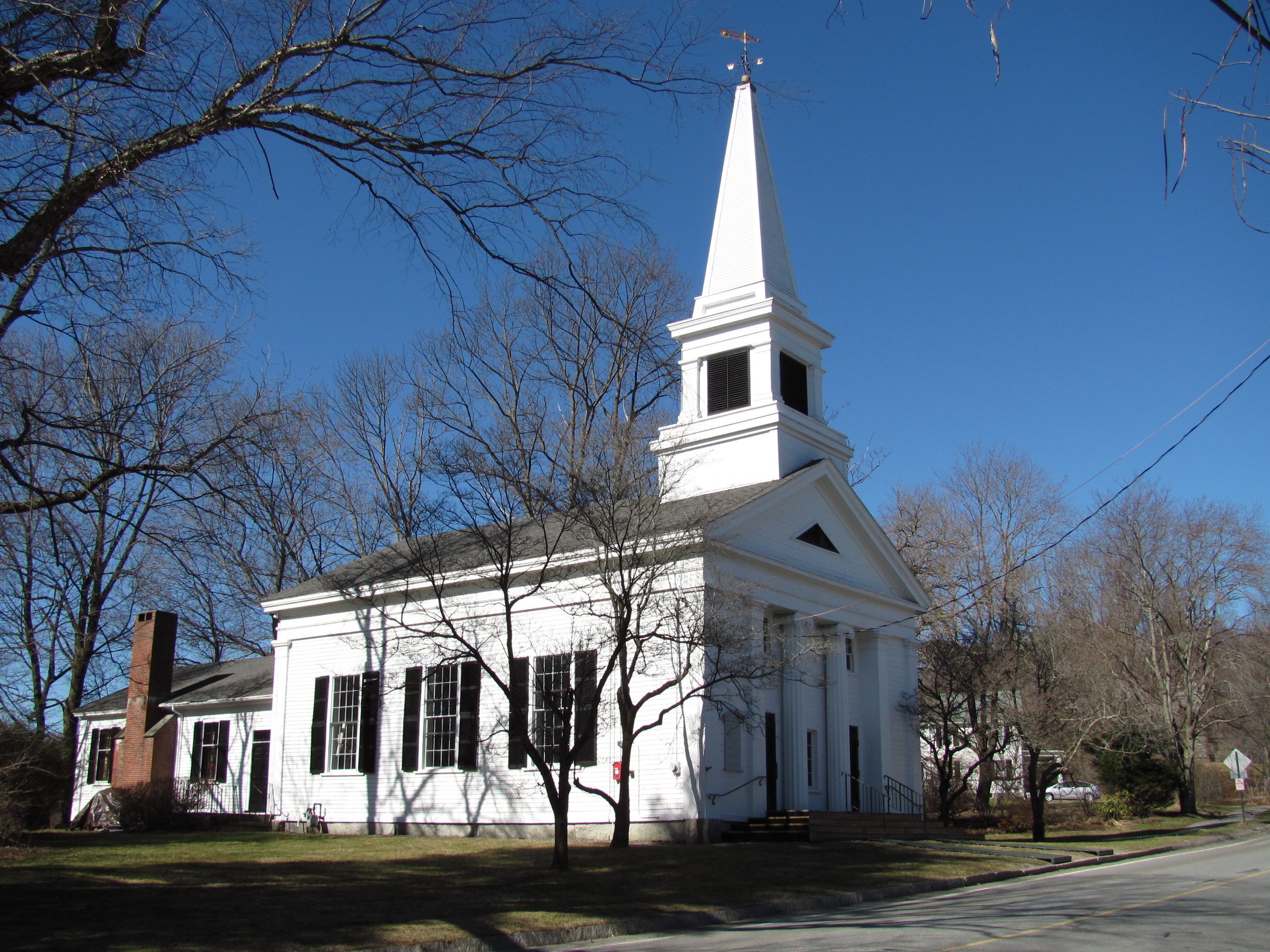
- First Parish

- Location within Massachusetts Location within the United States
- Location: Lincoln, Massachusetts
- Coordinates: 42°25′32″N 71°18′56″W
- Architect: Multiple
- Architectural style: Late 19th- and 20th-century Revivals, Greek Revival, Late Victorian
- NRHP reference No.: 85001604
- Added to NRHP: July 18, 1985

The Lincoln Center Historic District is a historic district covering Bedford, Lincoln, Old Lexington, Sandy Pond, Trapelo and Weston Roads in Lincoln, Massachusetts. The district encompasses Lincoln's civic heart, consisting of a traditional New England Meeting House (First Parish Lincoln), a late-Victorian church and the Lincoln Public Library, and a Georgian Revival (former) town hall (Bemis Hall), as well as a cluster of residences dating to the mid-18th century, when Lincoln was established as a town separate from its neighbors.

The Old Town Hall, which (as of 2026) stands on Lincoln Road, has been moved twice from its original location on Bedford Road. It was built in 1848.

The district was added to the National Register of Historic Places in 1985.

== See also ==
- National Register of Historic Places listings in Middlesex County, Massachusetts
