= H. Langford Warren House =

Historic house in Massachusetts, United States

- U.S. National Register of Historic Places
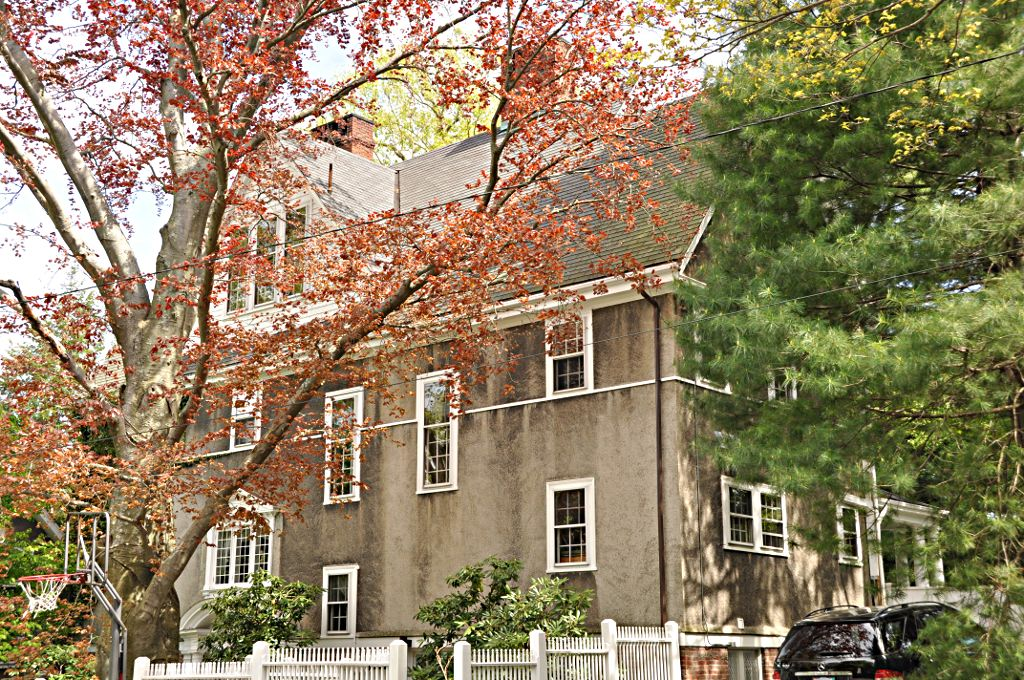

- Location within Massachusetts Location within the United States
- Location: Cambridge, Massachusetts
- Coordinates: 42°23′16″N 71°7′42″W
- Built: 1904
- Architect: Warren, Smith & Biscoe
- MPS: Cambridge MRA
- NRHP reference No.: 86001317
- Added to NRHP: May 19, 1986

The H. Langford Warren House is an historic house at 6 Garden Terrace in Cambridge, Massachusetts. It is a three-story structure, with a stuccoed exterior and a brick foundation. Its entry is sheltered by a Renaissance Revival hood supported by columns, and is flanked by sidelight windows. The windows are generally uniform in size and shape, but the number of lights varies, and they are grouped in places (for example, the stairwell above the main entrance) to provide additional lighting. The house was designed by and for H. Langford Warren, organizer and first department head of Harvard University's architecture department.

Herbert Langford Warren (1857–1917), both client and architect for this house, was an important figure in the Arts and Crafts movement in Boston, and one of the 24 founding members of the Society of Arts and Crafts in June 1897. (Some sources erroneously refer to him as "Lanford H. Warren".)

The house was built in 1904 and added to the National Register of Historic Places in 1986 (as "Langford H. Warren House").

== See also ==
- National Register of Historic Places listings in Cambridge, Massachusetts
