= Charles Stearns (minister) =

American minister (1753–1826)

The Reverend Charles Stearns
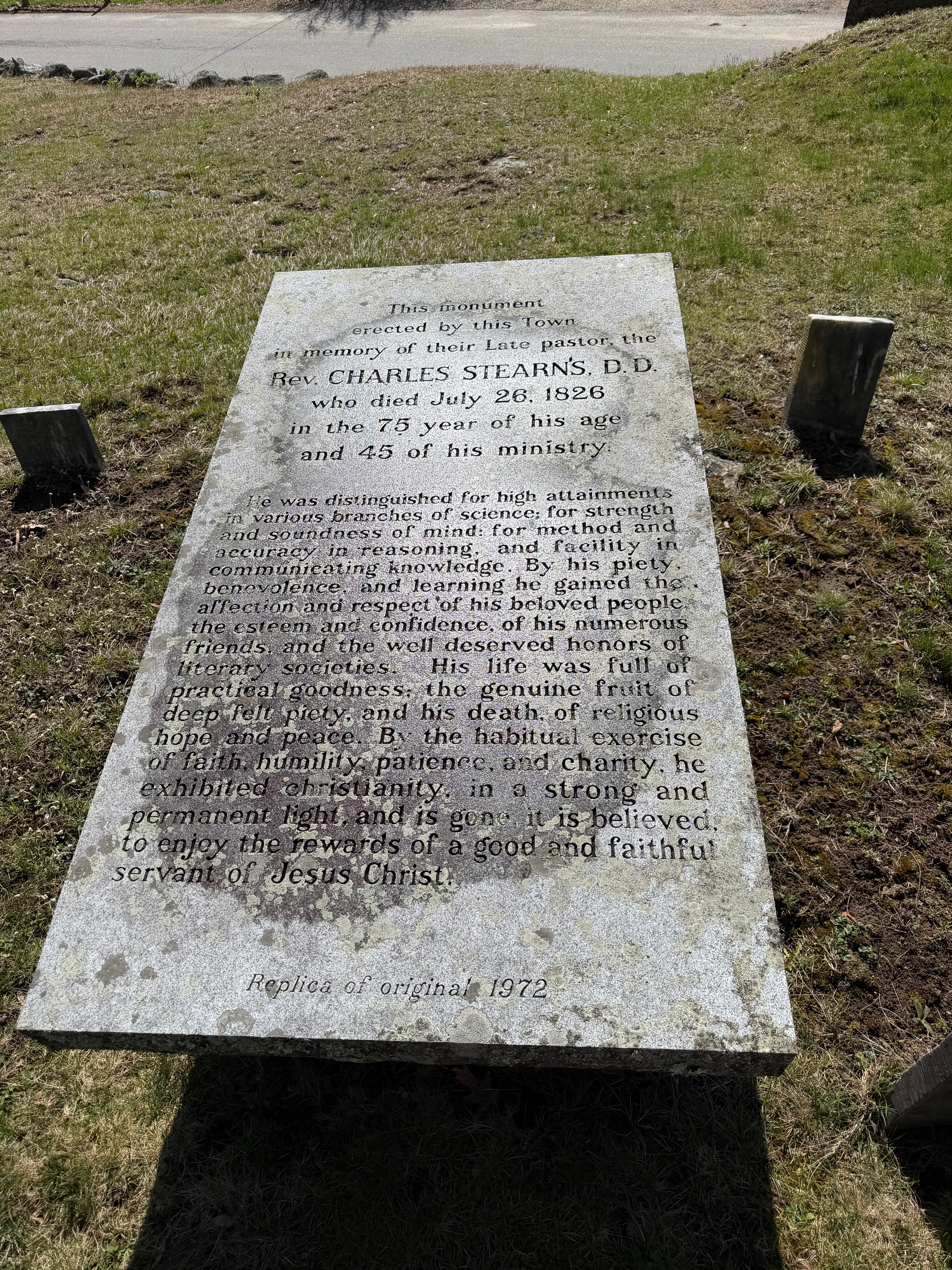
- Stearns's headstone, in Lincoln's Town Hill Cemetery, is a 1972 or the 1826 original
- Born: July 19, 1753; Lunenberg, Province of Massachusetts Bay
- Died: July 26, 1826 (aged 73); Lincoln, Massachusetts, U.S.
- Resting place: Town Hill Cemetery, Lincoln, Massachusetts, U.S.
- Occupation: Minister

Charles Stearns (July 19, 1753 – July 26, 1826) was an American Congregational minister who served as the pastor of the Congregational Church in Lincoln, Massachusetts, from 1781 until his death 45 years later.

He was classed among the "Unitarian divines" by Dr. William Buell Sprague.

== Early life ==
Stearns was born in 1753 in Lunenburg, Province of Massachusetts Bay, to Thomas Stearns and Lydia Mansfield. He was their fourth son and seventh child. His father was a descendant of Charles Stearns, a settler of Watertown, Province of Massachusetts Bay.

Stearns grew up in Leominster, Province of Massachusetts Bay, and graduated Harvard College in 1773.

He became principal of the Liberal School, in Lincoln, Massachusetts, which opened in 1793. While there, he wrote several education-related works, including Dramatic Dialogues for Use in Schools (1798). The school closed in 1808 but Stearns continued to tutor privately. His published works can be accessed at Early American Imprints, a microform and digital collection produced by the American Antiquarian Society. A summary article which surveys Stearns as a producer of children's drama is "The Dramatic Dialogues of Charles Stearns: An Appreciation" by Jonathan Levy, in Spotlight on the Child: Studies in the History of American Children's Theatre, ed. Roger L. Bedard and C. John Tolch (New York: Greenwood, 1989): 5–24.

== Ministry ==
Stearns became a preacher in Lincoln in October 1780, succeeding Rev. William Lawrence, who served for 32 years. Stearns was invited to be the pastor of the town's Congregational Church in February the following year. He was ordained in November.

In 1810, a year before his father's death at the age of 93, Lawrence gained a degree of Doctor of Divinity from Harvard College. He also became a Fellow of the American Academy of Arts and Sciences.

== Personal life ==
In the new year of 1782, Stearns married Susan Cowdry, with whom he had either eleven or twelve children: Susanna, Charles, Sarah, Francis, Rebecca, Samuel, Edwin, Dr. Thomas, Julia, Eliza and Reverend William and Daniel (twins). (One source lists eleven children, including Elizabeth Frances; another adds Francis as another son.) His grandson, through Julia, was Transcendentalist pioneer Charles Stearns Wheeler.

In 1795, Stearns's brother, Timothy, one of his seven known siblings, died at the age of 36 from tuberculosis. He had served as a lieutenant during the Revolutionary War.

== Death ==
Stearns died in 1826, a week after his 73rd birthday, from what is believed to have been bilious colic. He was interred in Town Hill Cemetery in Lincoln beside his children who had died before him. The epitaph on his table-marker gravestone was written by Stearns's friend, Dr. Ezra Ripley of Concord, Massachusetts, who also gave the sermon at Stearns's funeral. The marker was replaced in 1972. Stearns's widow survived him by six years and was buried beside him.

Stearns was succeeded as pastor of the Congregational church by the Rev. Elijah Diamond (or Demond).

=== Legacy ===
A "Stearns Room" was added to the First Parish Church in the 1960s.

== Publications ==
Stearns published the following eight works:

- The Ladies' Philosophy of Love (1797)
- A Sermon at the Exhibition of Sacred Music in Lincoln
- Dramatic Dialogues, for the use of Schools (1798)
- A Sermon, preached Nov. 11, 1806, at the Interment of the Hon. Eleazer Brooks
- A Sermon, delivered at Concord, before the Bible Society, April 16, 1815
- A Sermon, delivered before the Convention of Congregational Ministers in Massachusetts, in Boston, June 1, 1815
- Principles of Religion and Morality (1798 and 1807)
- A Sermon at the Interment of Mrs. Foster, of Littleton
