= Herbert Langford Warren =

American architect

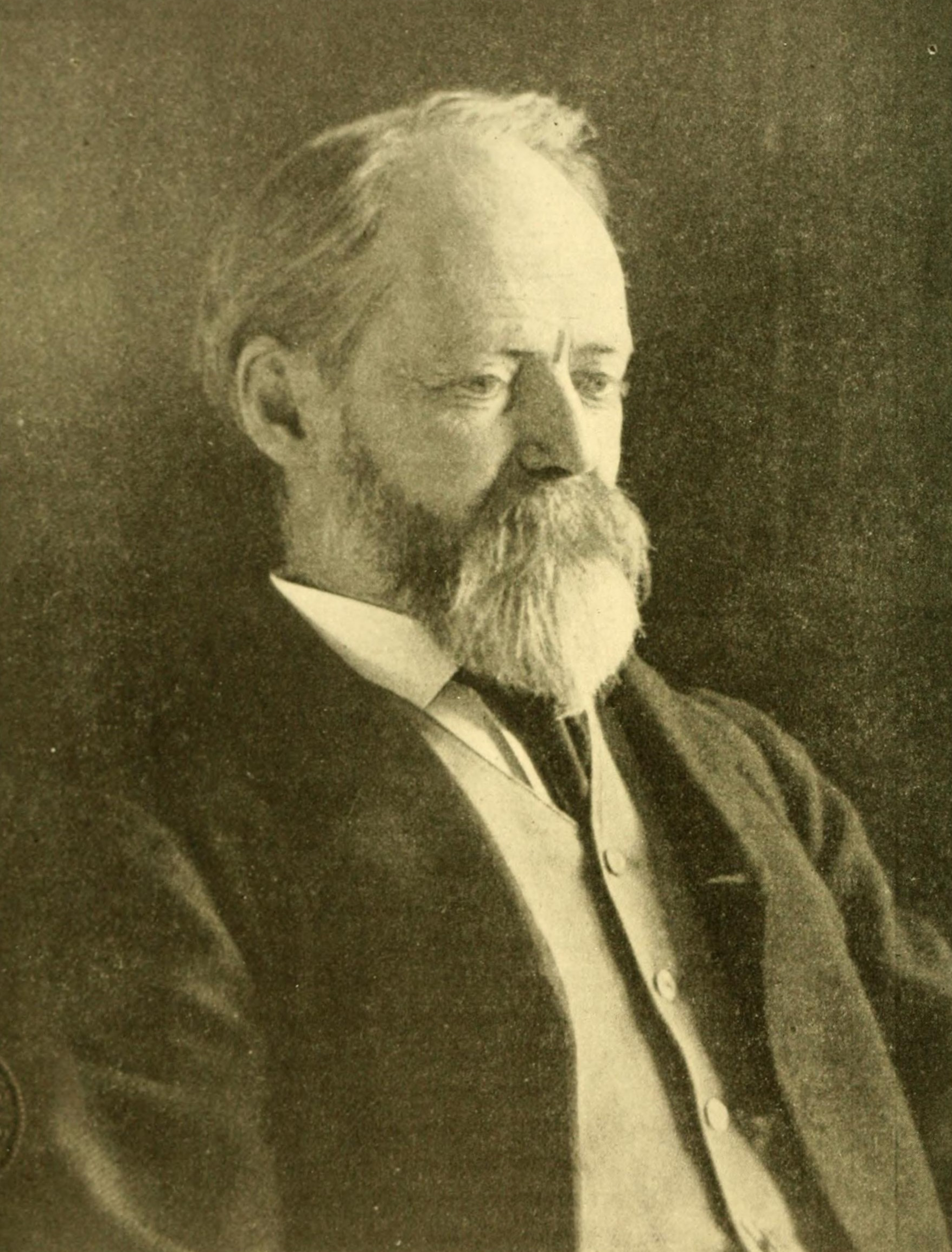
- Born: 29 March 1857; Manchester, England
- Died: 27 June 1917 (aged 60); Cambridge, Massachusetts
- Education: Owens College Manchester; Massachusetts Institute of Technology
- Occupation: Architect
- Spouse: Catharine Clark Reed (m. 1887)
- Practice: Warren, Smith and Bisco (later Warren & Smith)
- Buildings: Lincoln Town Hall; Billerica Town Hall; The Swedenborg Chapel; H. Langford Warren House
- Known for: Founded the School of Architecture at Harvard University

1st Dean of the Harvard University School of Architecture
- In office 1912 – June 1917
- Succeeded by: Charles Wilson Killam (acting)

3rd President of The Society of Arts and Crafts of Boston
- In office 1903–1917
- Preceded by: Arthur Astor Carey
- Succeeded by: Richard Clipston Sturgis

Herbert Langford Warren (29 March 1857 – 27 June 1917) was an English architect who practiced in New England. He is noted for his involvement in the American Arts and Crafts movement, and as the founder of the School of Architecture at Harvard University.

== Biography ==
Warren was born in Manchester, England. His father was Samuel Mills Warren, of colonial New England ancestry, and his mother was Sarah Anne Broadfield from Shropshire. His parents were Swedenborgians, and he followed them in that allegiance. He was educated in Manchester, except for two years (1869–1871) during which he attended the gymnasia of Gotha and Dresden, Germany. From 1871–1975 he attended Owens College Manchester, and then spent a year as draughtsman in the office of the Manchester architect William Dawes.

The family moved to the United States in 1876. He studied for two years at the Massachusetts Institute of Technology (1877–1879) then worked in the office of the architect H. H. Richardson in Brookline until 1884. During this period he took courses with Charles Eliot Norton as a special student at Harvard. In 1884 he travelled to Europe, studying the architecture of England, Italy, and France. On his return to the United States he set up in architectural practice in Boston, and later had an office in Troy, New York. He married in 1887, to Catharine Clark Reed. He went into partnership with Lewis H. Bacon in 1894, an arrangement that lasted about a year. The firm of Warren, Smith and Biscoe was set up in 1900 with Frank Patterson Smith and Maurice Biscoe. It became Warren & Smith in 1906 when Biscoe moved to Colorado.

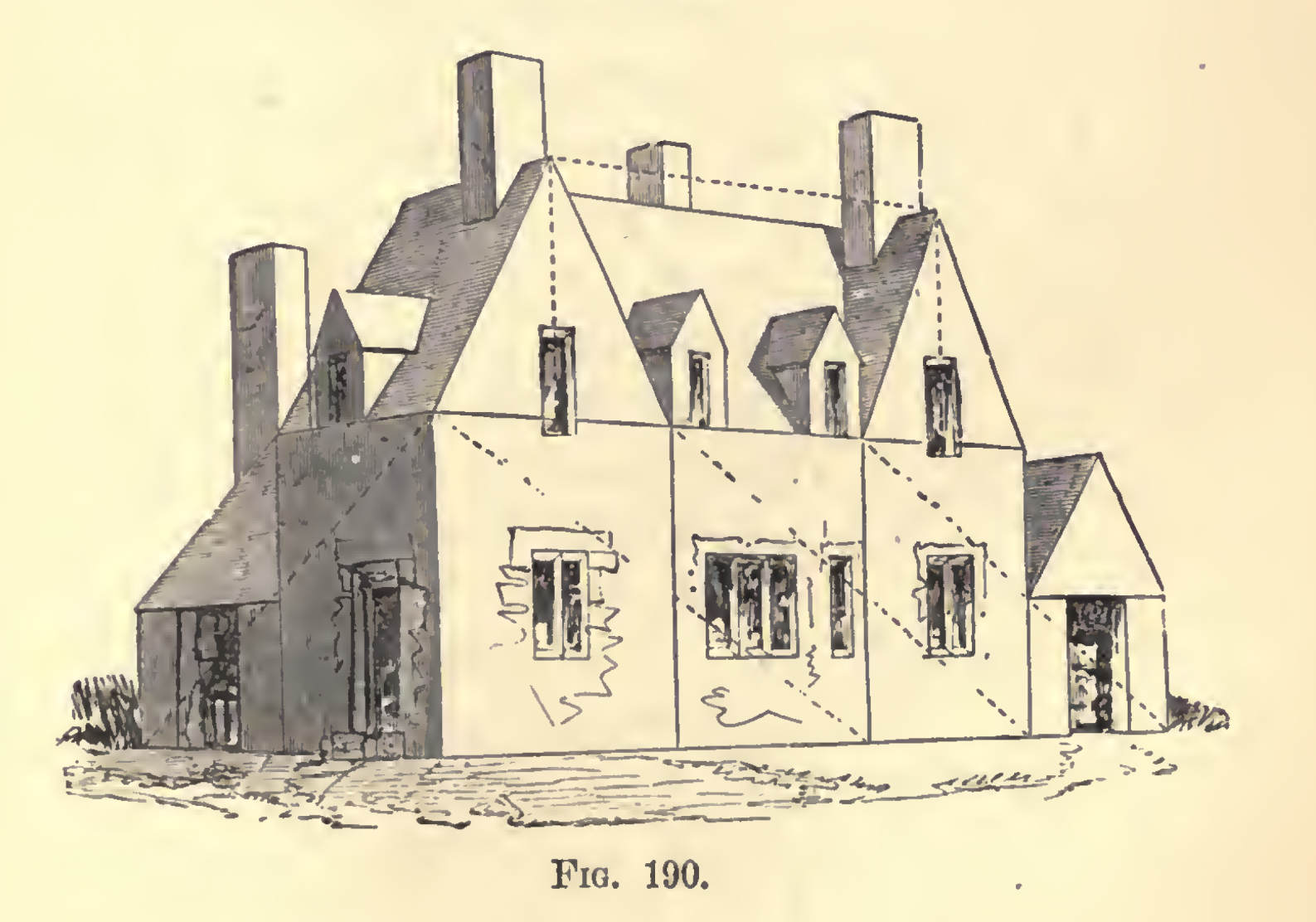
An illustration from Handbook of Drawing by William Walker, one of Warren's teachers at Owens College

As well as practicing architecture, Warren was a teacher and administrator with Harvard University from 1893, becoming Professor of Architecture in 1903. Warren developed the program of teaching of architecture at Harvard, culminating in the establishment of the School of Architecture in 1912. His approach to teaching emphasized architectural history, regarding this as just as important as technical training. He expressed the importance of this balance in an article on Architectural education at Harvard University:

The peculiar fascination of architecture lies in the fact that it is at once a fine art of the most exalted and ideal character and is at the same time in touch, as no other fine art is, with the most practical and exacting demands of everyday life.

Warren taught three-year-long courses in the history of European architecture, covering classical Greece, the Middle Ages, and the Renaissance. He emphasized that the purpose of this study was not to be able to imitate historical styles, but to understand the fundamental principles of design. In a memoir written after Warren's death, John Taylor Boyd, one of his students, wrote: "In his teaching, the experience of a practicing architect made real and mellowed the research of the scholar." Warren also taught architectural history at the Massachusetts Institute of Technology and at the Cambridge School of Architectural and Landscape Design for Women.

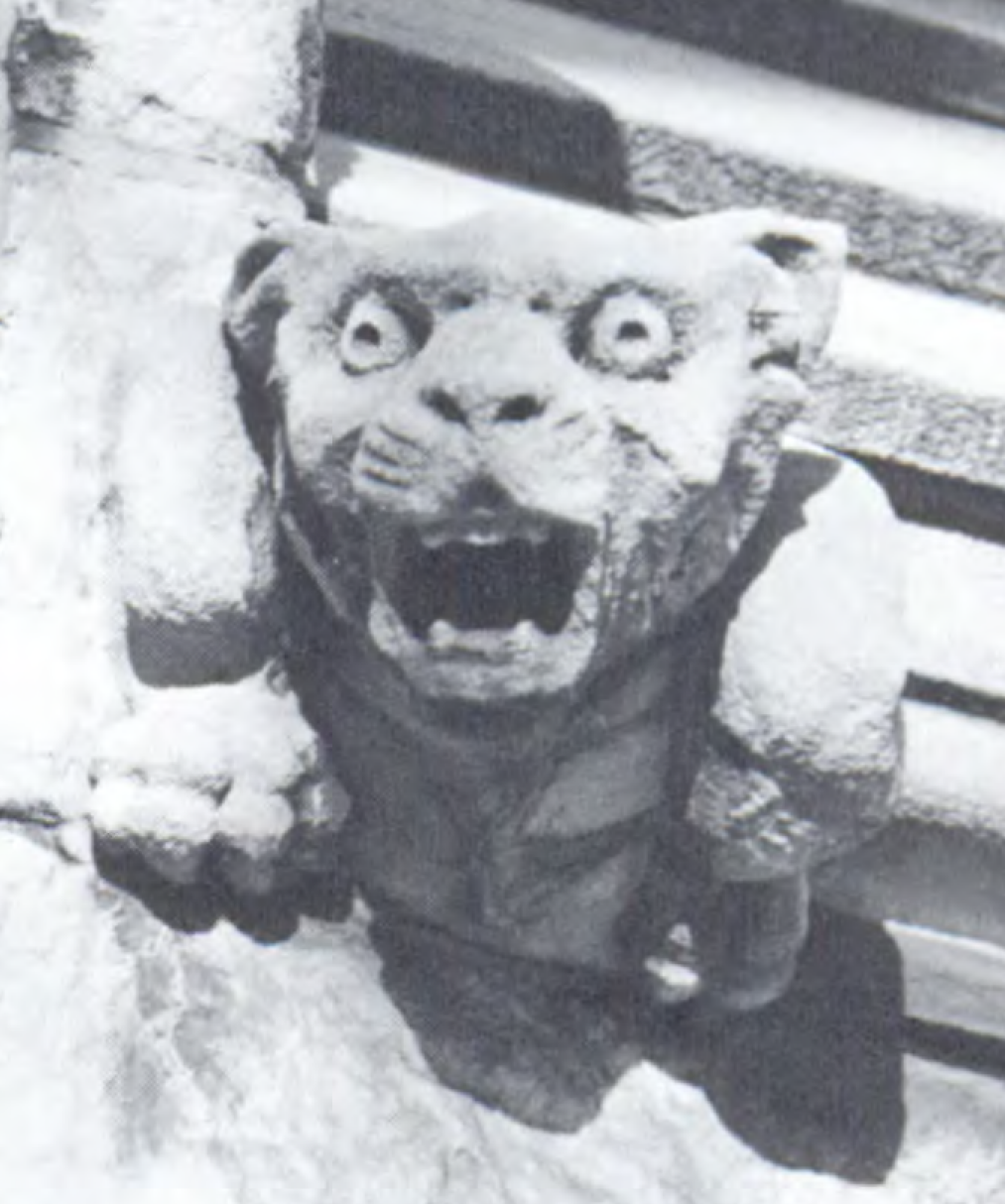
Sculpture from the Church of the Holy City, probably by John Evans

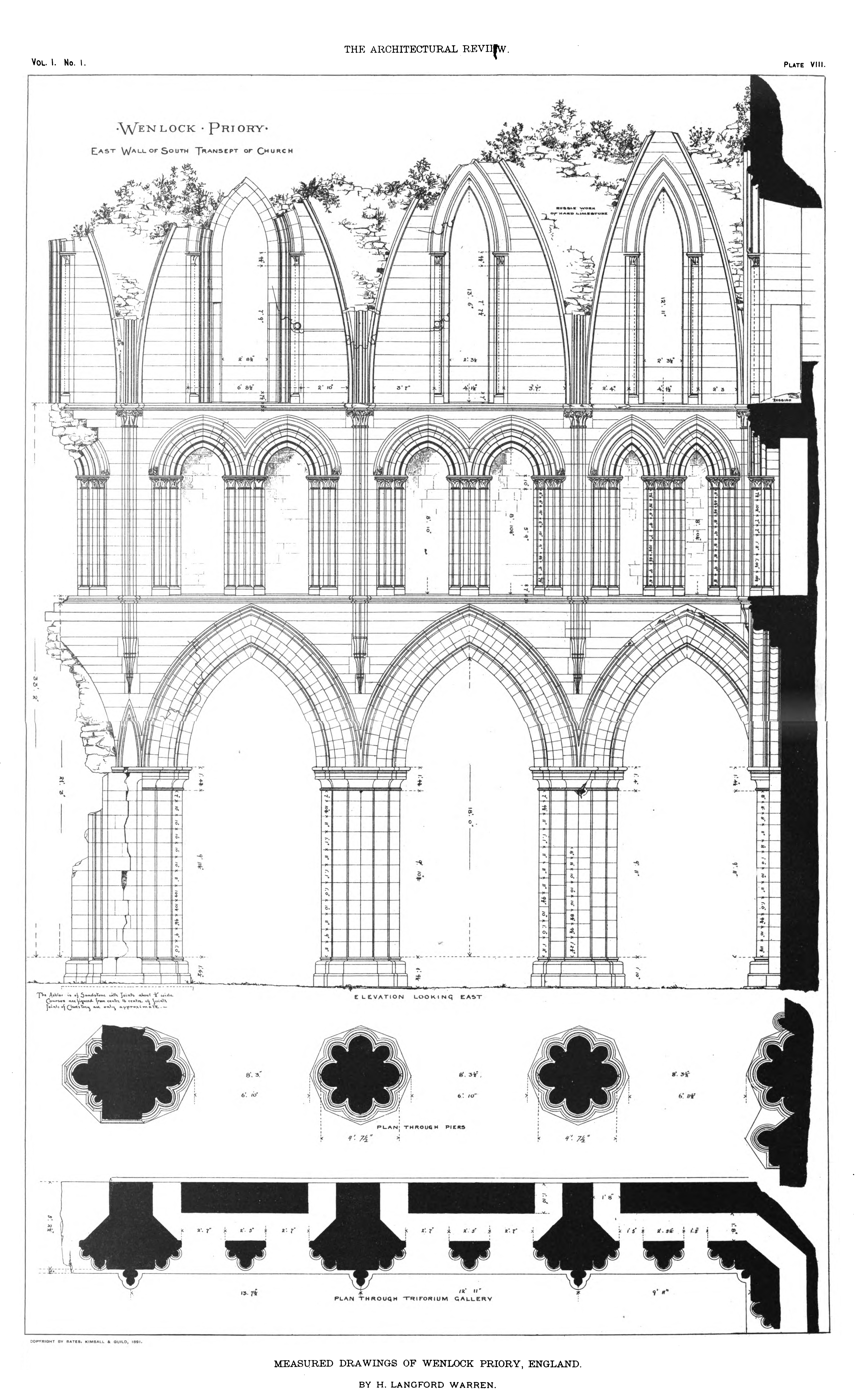
Wenlock Priory east wall, drawn in 1884, from Warren (1891)

== Arts and Crafts movement ==
Warren made a major contribution to the Arts and Crafts movement, which informed both his teaching and practice. A major exhibition devoted to handicrafts was held in Boston in April 1897, inspired by the English Arts and Crafts movement. The exhibition stimulated discussions on forming a society, with Warren in the chair. The Society of Arts and Crafts of Boston was founded in May 1897, with Charles Eliot Norton as president. The Society was based in Boston, but had the aim to become a National organization. The activities of the Society included exhibitions; education, including a library, lectures and drawing classes; a salesroom; and a Magazine, called Handicraft. Warren became President of the Society in 1904 following disagreements over political direction. Under Warren's leadership the American Society would reject the socialism that was an important part of the English movement. An important part of the Society's activities was encouraging close relations between architects and designers on the one hand and craftsmen on the other. One craftsman who had worked closely with H. H. Richardson and continued to collaborate with Warren was the sculptor John Evans. A later development was the formation of the National League of Handicraft Societies in 1907, with Warren as President.

== Political and social views ==
Warren was also involved in broader political and social issues, in particular the movement in support of the Allied cause in the years of U.S. neutrality in World War I. In April 1915 Warren sent a letter to The Nation entitled The English Tradition. He argued that the basis of American society is fundamentally English. He wrote: "like our language, our literature, and our common law, our political and social thought, our whole spiritual and intellectual atmosphere are by inheritance and tradition fundamentally English."

This idea of Englishness informed not only his political thought, and his specific advocacy of involvement on the side of the Allies, but his aesthetic as well, in particular the choice of English and early Anglo-American models for his architectural designs. This did not prevent him from admiring many aspects of German culture, and he was actively involved in a project for a Germanic Museum at Harvard, which was completed after his death.

Warren was also an active supporter of the Boston-based Citizen's League, and the American Rights League which it later merged with, and was an author of the Address to the people of the allied nations (April 1916). Signed by 500 prominent Americans, and later known as the Address of the 500 this urged American support for the allies. He was also distressed by the destruction of many of the buildings in France that he had studied and drawn thirty years earlier.

He died at his home in Cambridge on 27 June 1917, and was survived by his wife and four children. Some thought that the strain of his campaigning work in addition to his normal workload caused his health to fail. Warren's funeral was held 7 July 1917 at Harvard's Appleton Chapel with Richard Clipston Sturgis, Morton Prince, and Charles Wilson Killam as pallbearers. He was buried at Walnut Hills Cemetery in Brookline, Massachusetts.

== Buildings ==
Warren's early buildings were in a Romanesque Revival style, the style favored by H. H. Richardson, with whom he had worked. Examples include the Page House in Boston, and the competition design (not implemented) for the Cathedral of St. John the Divine in New York City. Later works were influenced more by English traditions, and mainly used Gothic Revival for churches, and Colonial Revival for houses and for his town and city halls. He was opposed to styles such as those inspired by the French Beaux-Arts tradition, considering that they lacked restraint. While Warren's buildings were traditional in terms of style, as Meister has noted, the use of space in his houses had much in common with the stylistically more modern architects, particularly in the West and Midwest, with rooms interconnecting, and with internal spaces connecting with the outside.

Buildings by Warren or his partnerships include:

=== Warren ===
- Charles J. Page House — Westland Avenue, Boston, Massachusetts (1888, demolished)
- Troy Orphan Asylum — Troy, New York (1891–1892, demolished)
- S. Alexander Orr House — Second and Congress Streets, Troy, New York (1890–1892, demolished)
- Lincoln Town Hall (now Bemis Hall) — Lincoln, Massachusetts (1891–1892)
- National Church of the Holy City (Swedenborgian) — Washington D.C. (1894–1896)

=== Warren and Bacon ===
- Billerica Town Hall (now Billerica Public Library) — Billerica, Massachusetts (1894–1895)

=== Warren, Smith and Biscoe ===
- New Church Theological School Chapel — Cambridge, Massachusetts (1899–1901)
- Theodore W. Richards House — 15 Follen Street, Cambridge, Massachusetts (1900)
- Robert DeCourcy Ward House — Cambridge, Massachusetts (1901)
- "Annerslea" (Edward H. Rathbun House) — Woonsocket, Rhode Island (1902)
- Concord City Hall — Concord, New Hampshire (1902–1903)
- H. Langford Warren House — Cambridge, Massachusetts (1904)

=== Warren and Smith ===
- Carey House — Proctor Academy, Andover, New Hampshire (1909, demolished)
- Everett D. Chadwick House — Winchester, Massachusetts (1909)
- John Jefferson Flowers Memorial Hall — Woman's Methodist College, Montgomery, Alabama (1909)
- Church of the Epiphany (Episcopalian) — Winchester, Massachusetts (1911)
- Cruft Laboratory — Harvard University, Cambridge, Massachusetts (1913–1915)
- Jordan Hospital — Plymouth, Massachusetts (1915)

A comprehensive list of Warren's buildings and projects can be found in the monograph by Maureen Meister (2003)

== Gallery of works ==
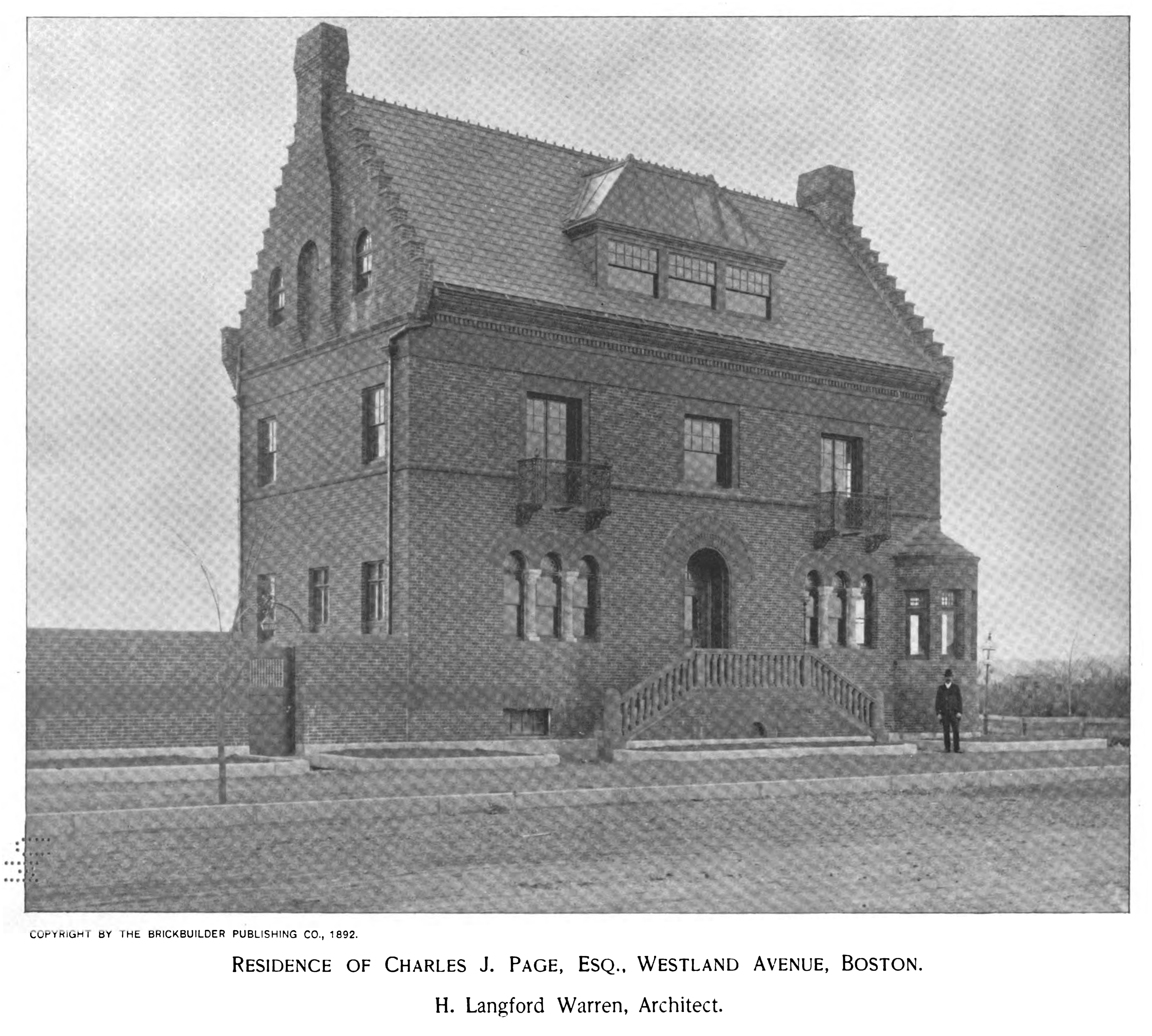
Residence of Charles J. Page, Westland Avenue, Boston, Massachusetts

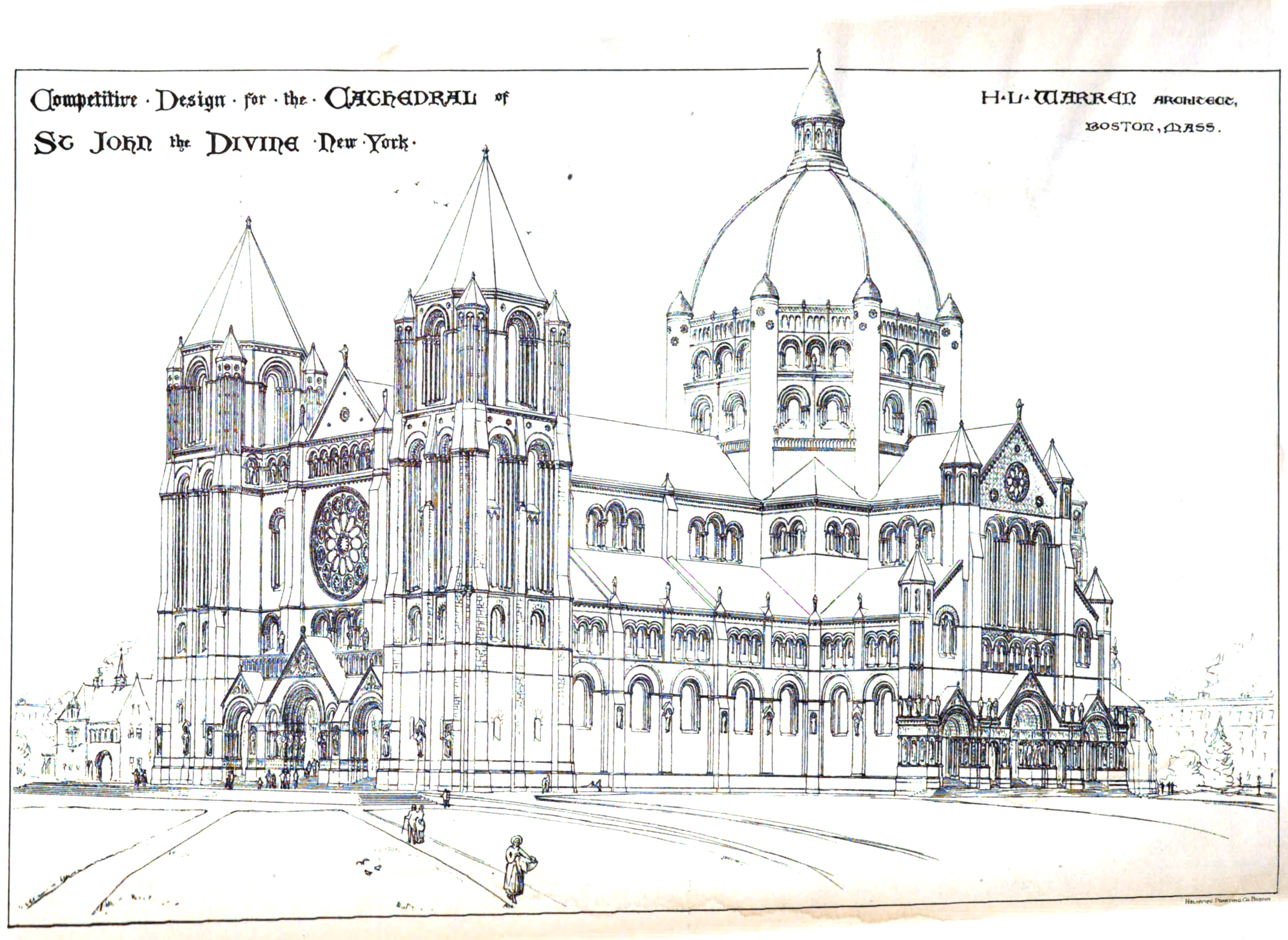
Design for the Cathedral of St. John the Divine, New York City, 1889

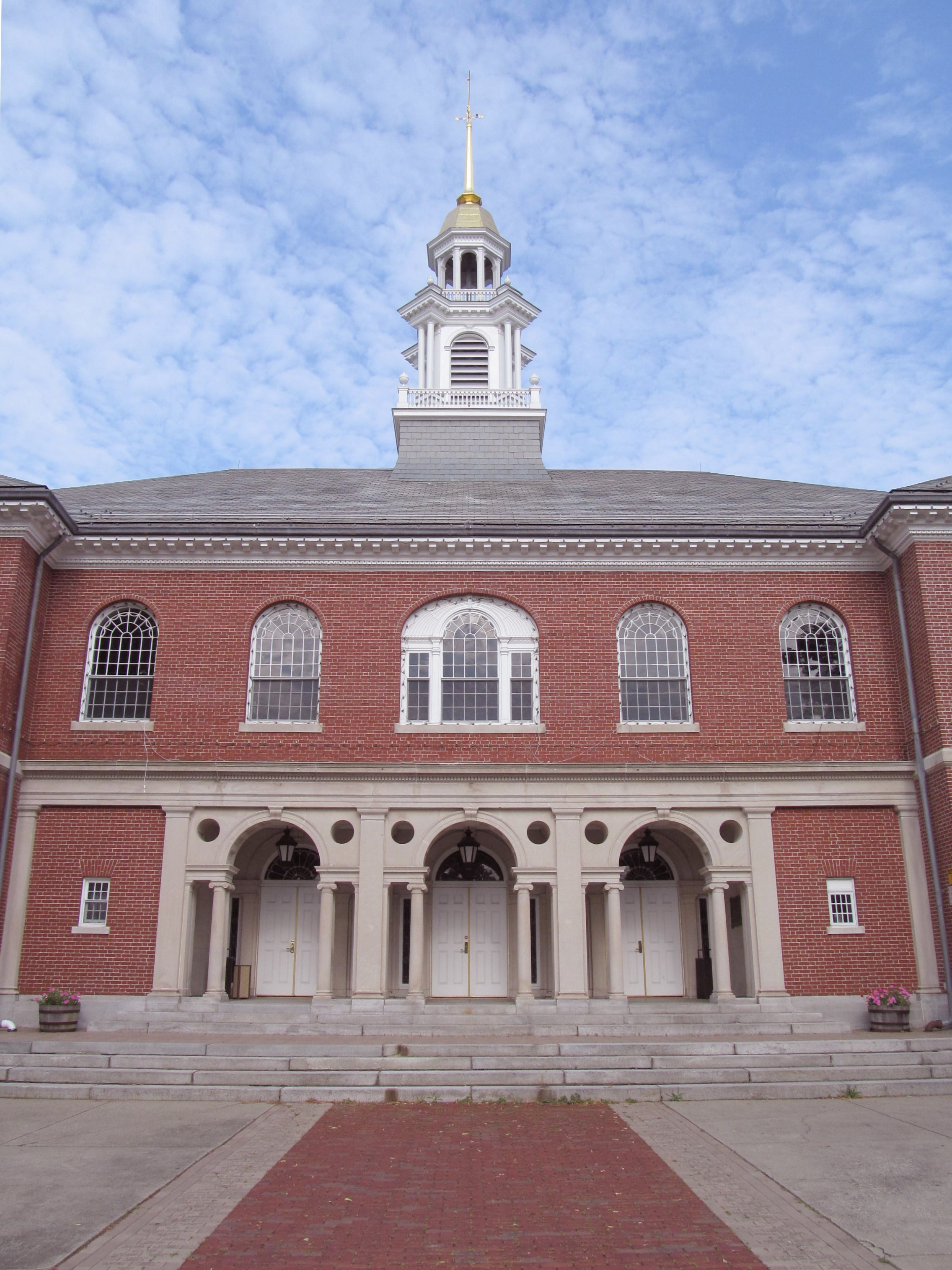
Billerica Town Hall, Billerica, Massachusetts

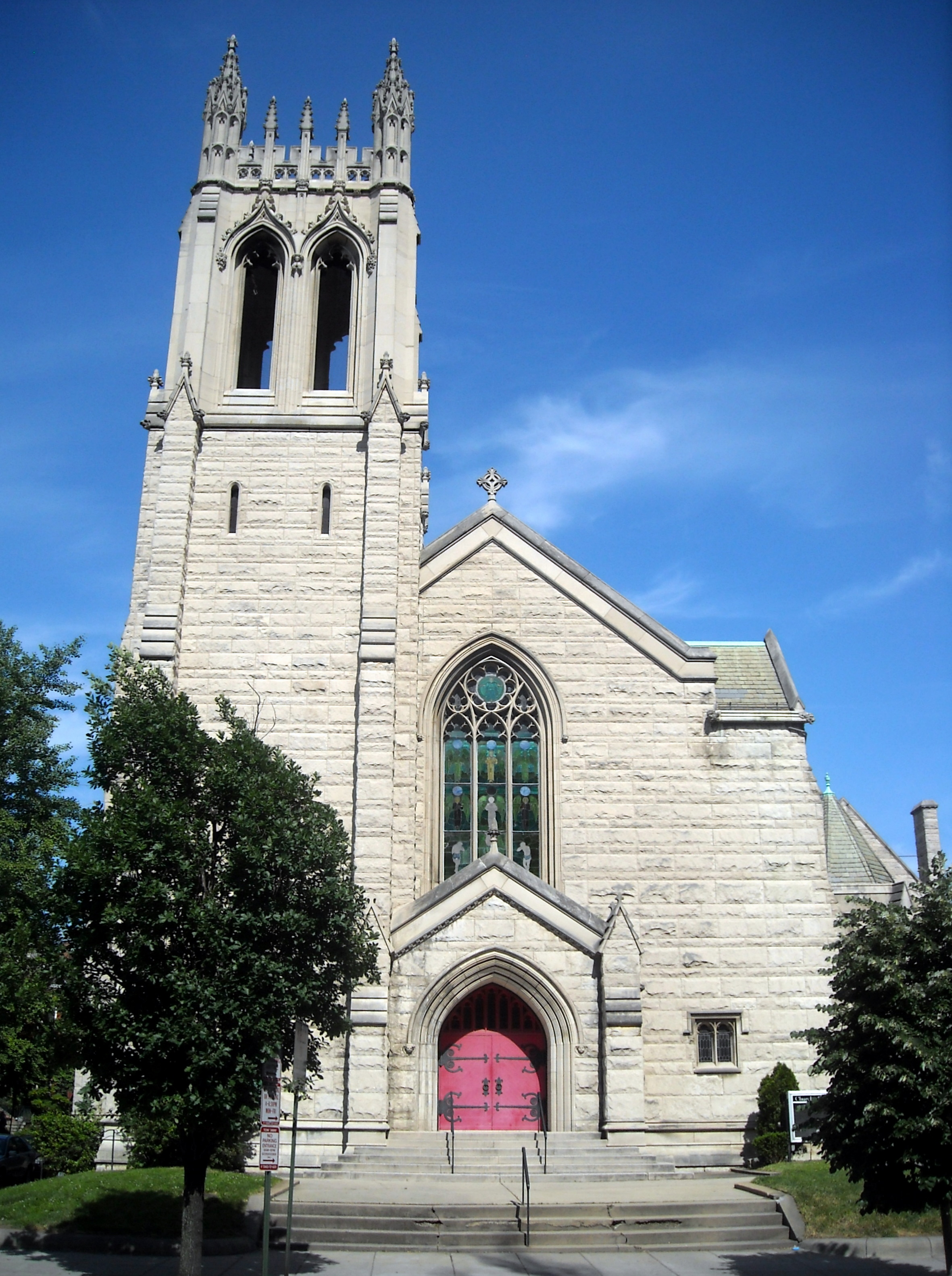
National Church of the Holy City, Washington D.C.

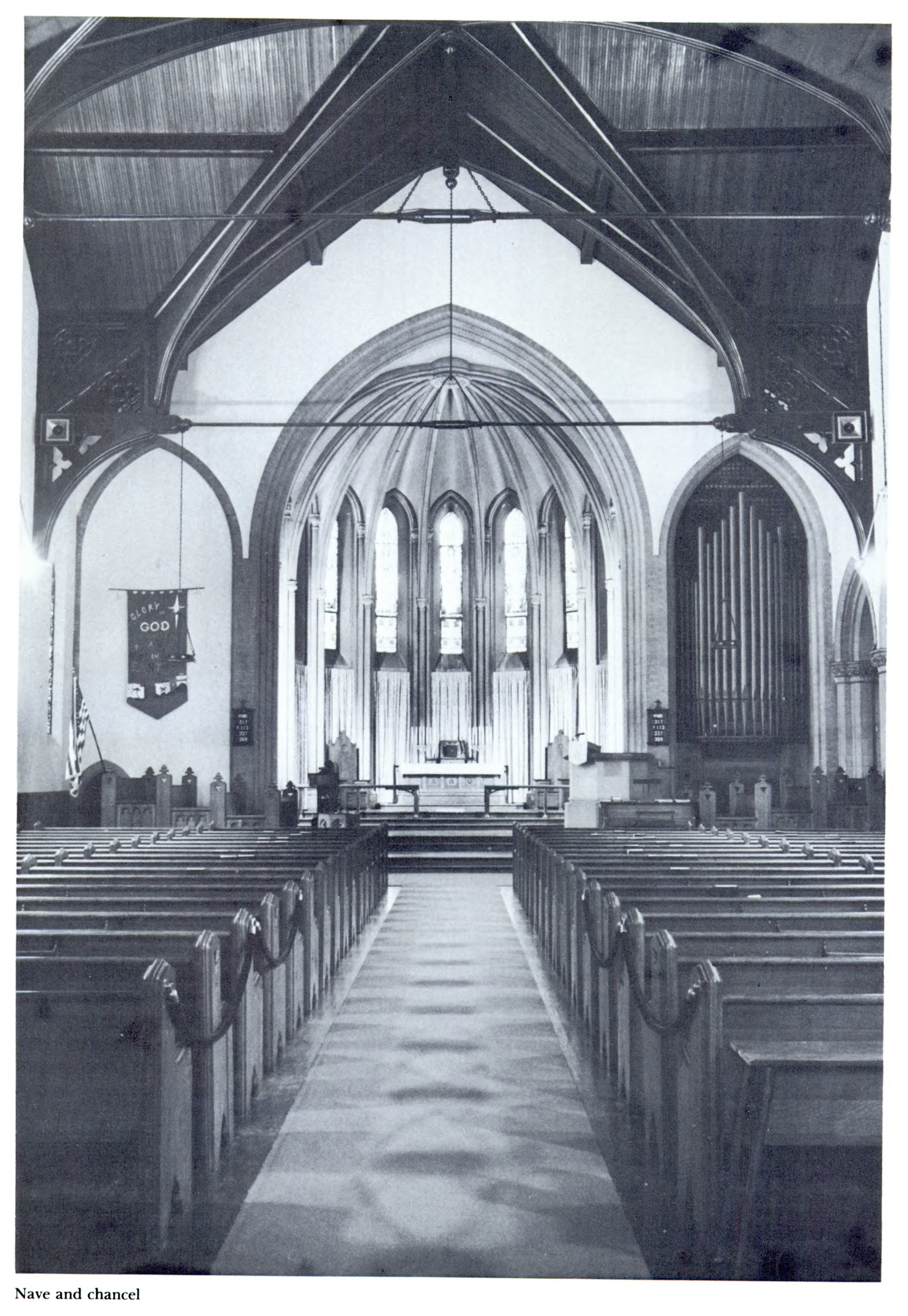
Church of the Holy City, interior

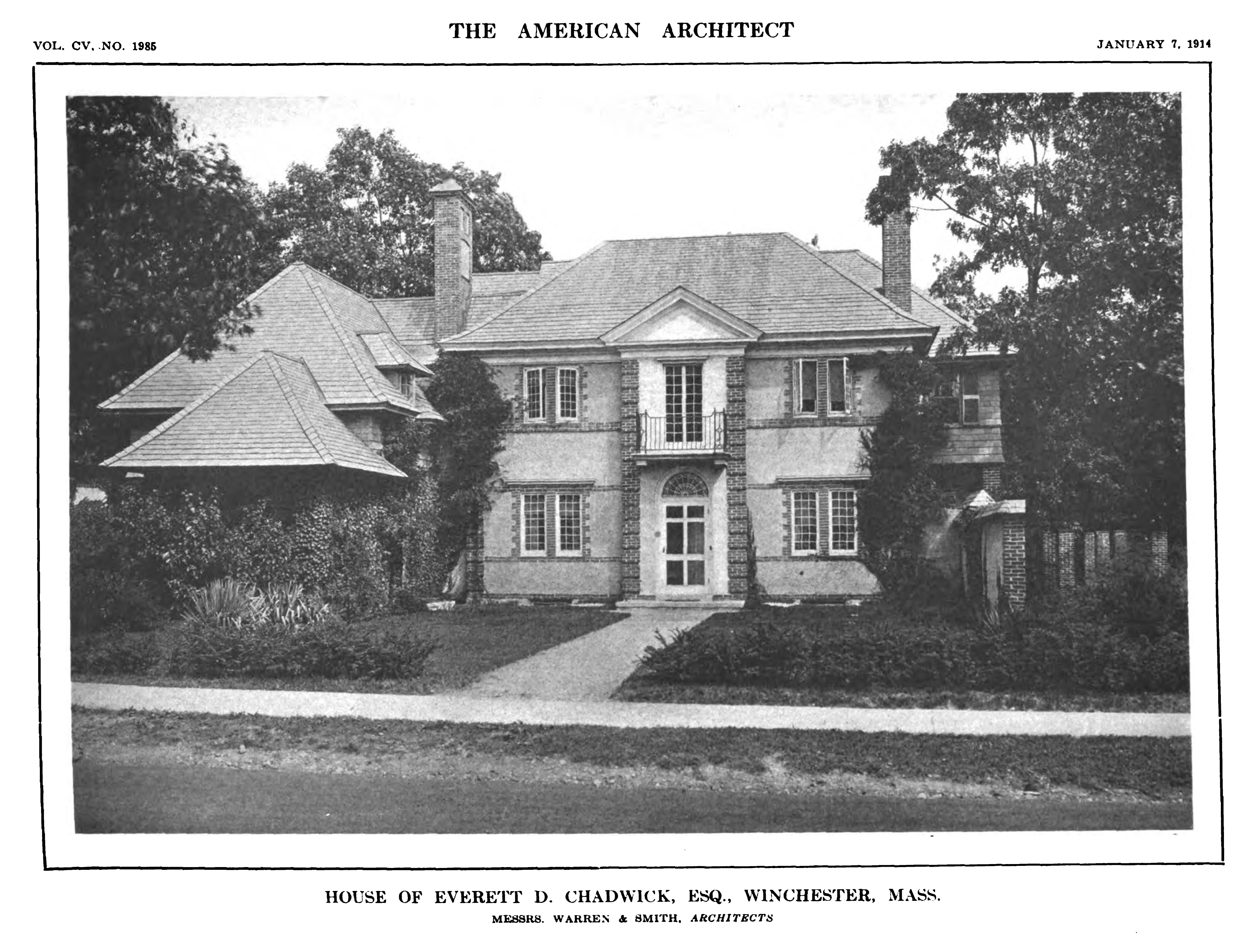
Chadwick House, Winchester, Massachusetts

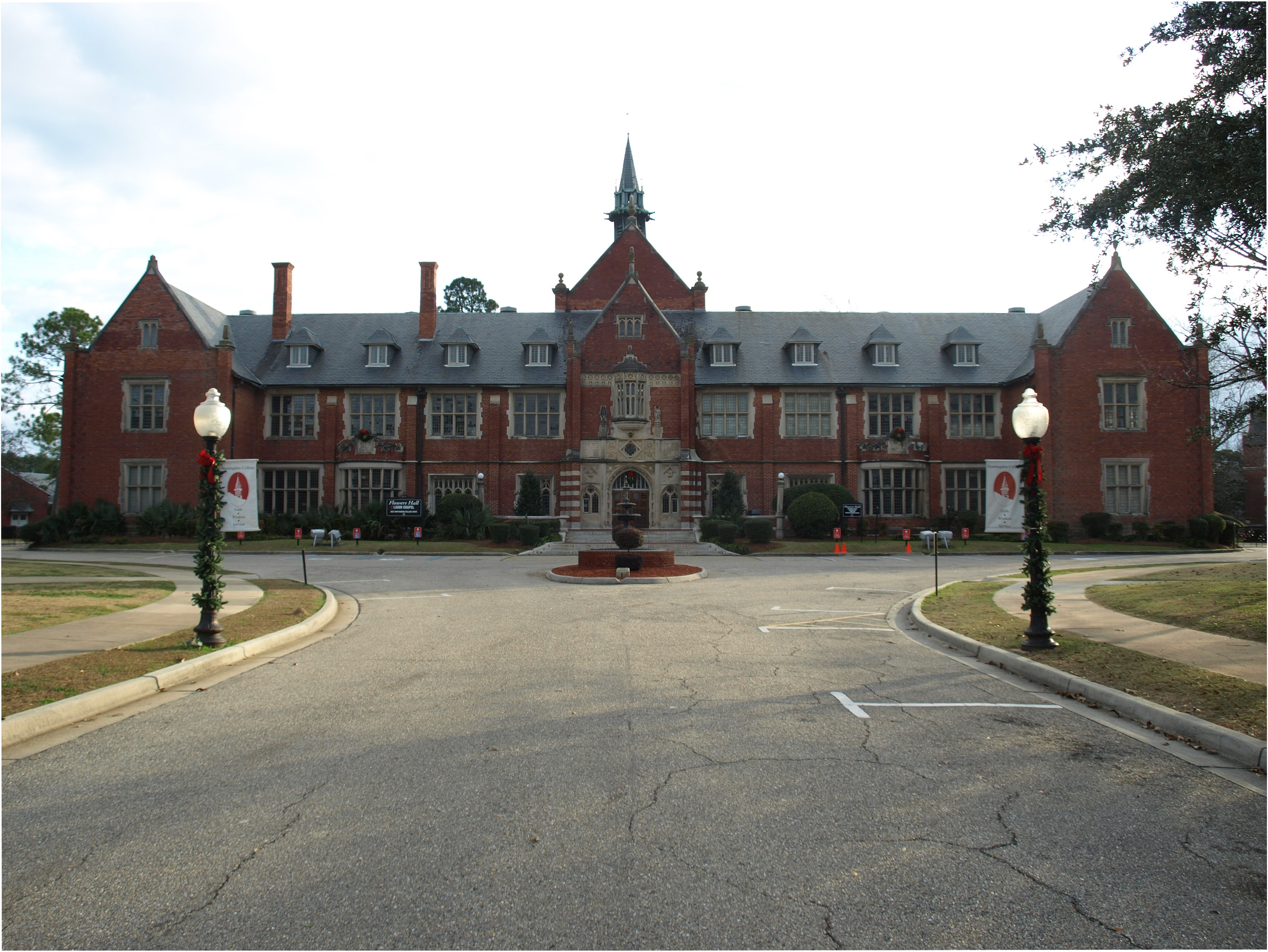
John Jefferson Flowers Memorial Hall

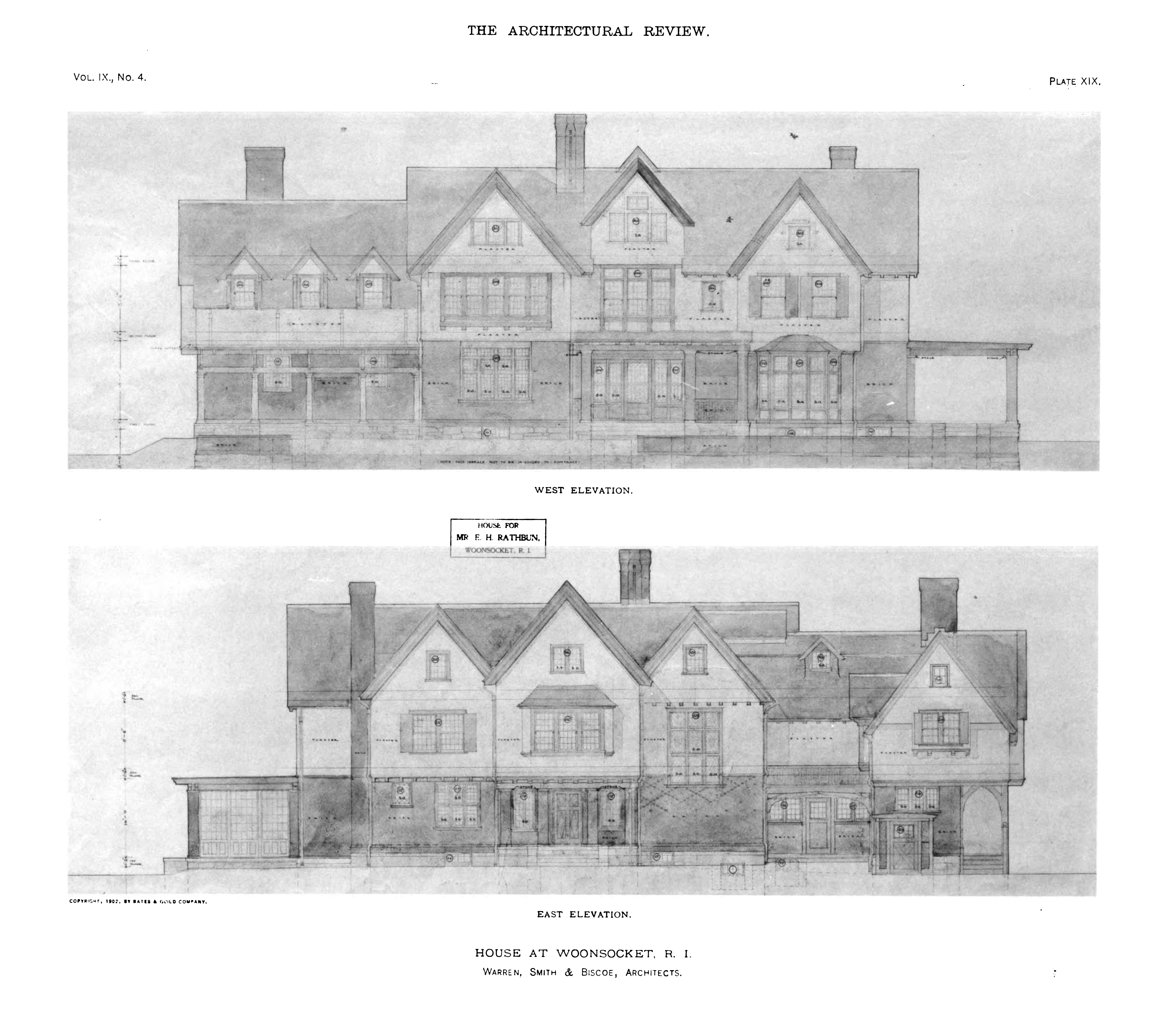
Annerslea, Woonsocket, Rhode Island

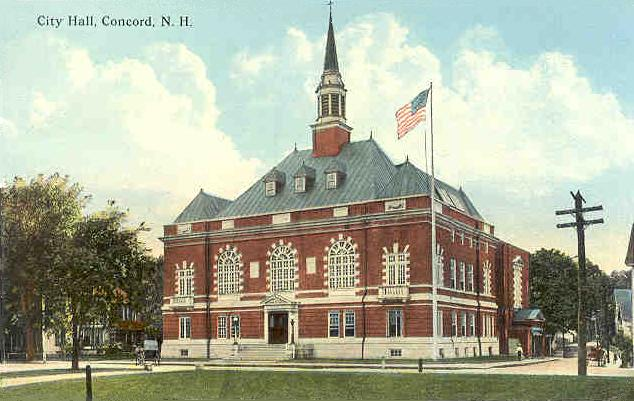
Concord City Hall, Concord, New Hampshire

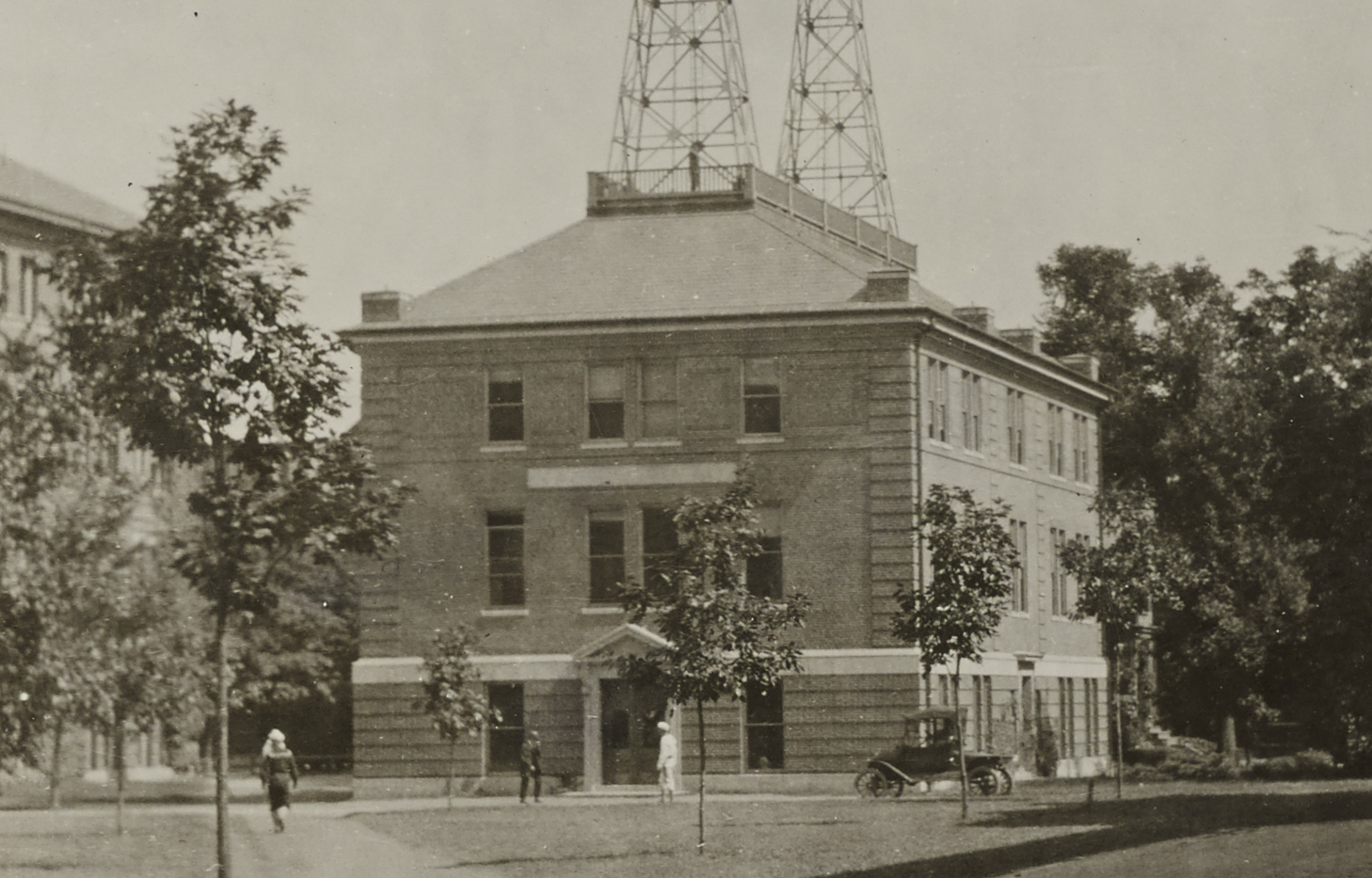
Cruft Laboratory, Harvard University

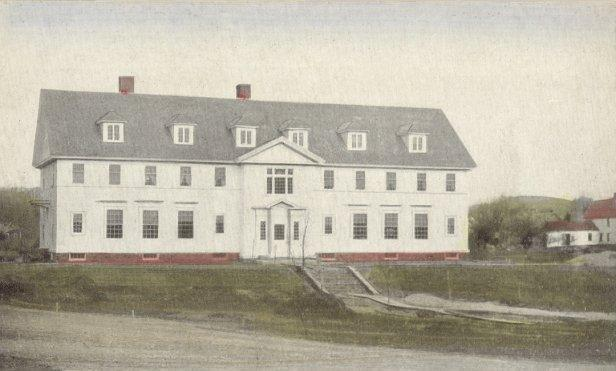
Carey House at Proctor Academy

== Positions held ==
=== Harvard University ===
- 1893 – 1894: Instructor
- 1894 – 1899: Assistant Professor
- 1899 – 1917: Professor
- 1916 – 1917: Dean of architectural faculty

=== Non-Academic ===
- Director of the American Institute of Architects
- Secretary of the Boston Society of Architects
- President of the National League of Handicraft Societies
- President of The Society of Arts and Crafts of Boston (1904–1917)

== Selected bibliography ==
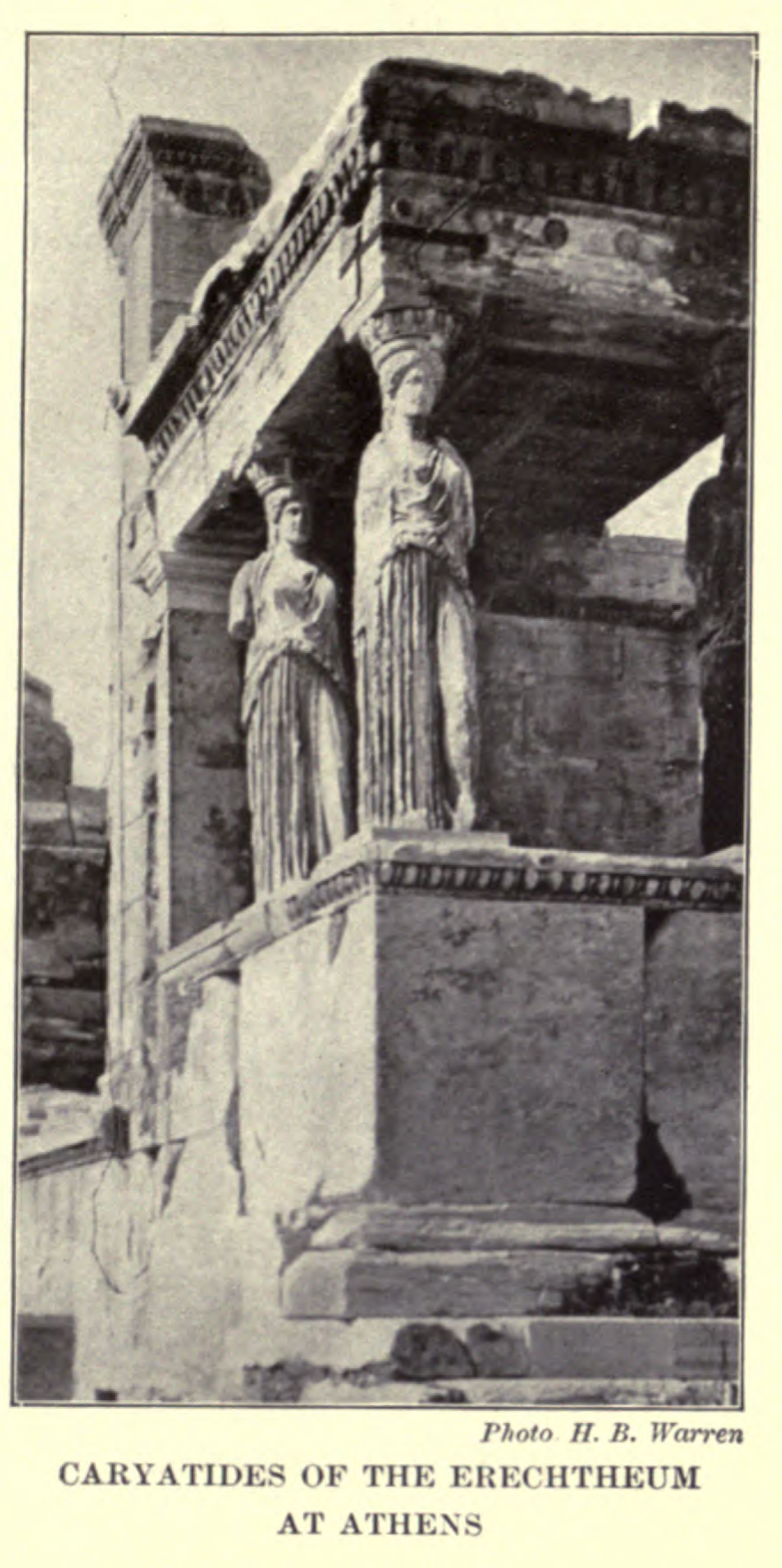
A photograph from Vitruvius The Ten Books on Architecture

- Warren, H.Langford (1891). "Notes on Wenlock Priory". The Architectural Review. 1 (1 Pages 1-4 and No 6 Pages 49-51).
- —— (1892). "A few neglected considerations with respect to brick architecture". The Brickbuilder. 1 (1): 3–5.
- —— (1893). "The use and abuse of precedent". The Architectural Review. 2 Part 2 Pages 11-15 and Part 3 Pages 21-25.
- —— (1893). "On the use of color in architectural design". The American Architect and Building News. 42 (931): 45–47.
- —— (1899). "The influence of France upon American Architecture". The American Architect and Building News. 69 (1248): 67–68.
- —— (1899), "The Year's Architecture", Catalogue of the Architectural Exhibition, St. Botolph Club, 2 Newbury Street Boston, Boston Architectural Club and Boston Society of Architects, pp. 15–18
- ——; Hale, Edward Everett (1899). Picturesque and architectural New England ... Descriptive, picturesque, architectural. Boston: D. H. Hurd & Co.
- —— (1900). "Architecture: Renaissance and Modern". In Buckley, Edmund (ed.). The fine arts; a university course in sculpture, painting, architecture and decoration in their history, development and principles. Chicago: National Arts Society. pp. 190–232.
- —— (1904). "Recent domestic architecture in England". The Architectural Review. 11 (1): 5–12.
- —— (1907). "The Department of Architecture of Harvard University". Architectural Record. 22 (1): 134–150.
- —— (1919). The foundations of classic architecture. New York: MacMillan.
- Warren provided the illustrations for the translation of Vitruvius' The Ten Books on Architecture by Morris Hickey Morgan (1914)
