= Lincoln Public Library (Lincoln, Massachusetts) =

Public library in Lincoln, Massachusetts, US

Coordinates: 42°25′34″N 71°18′11″W

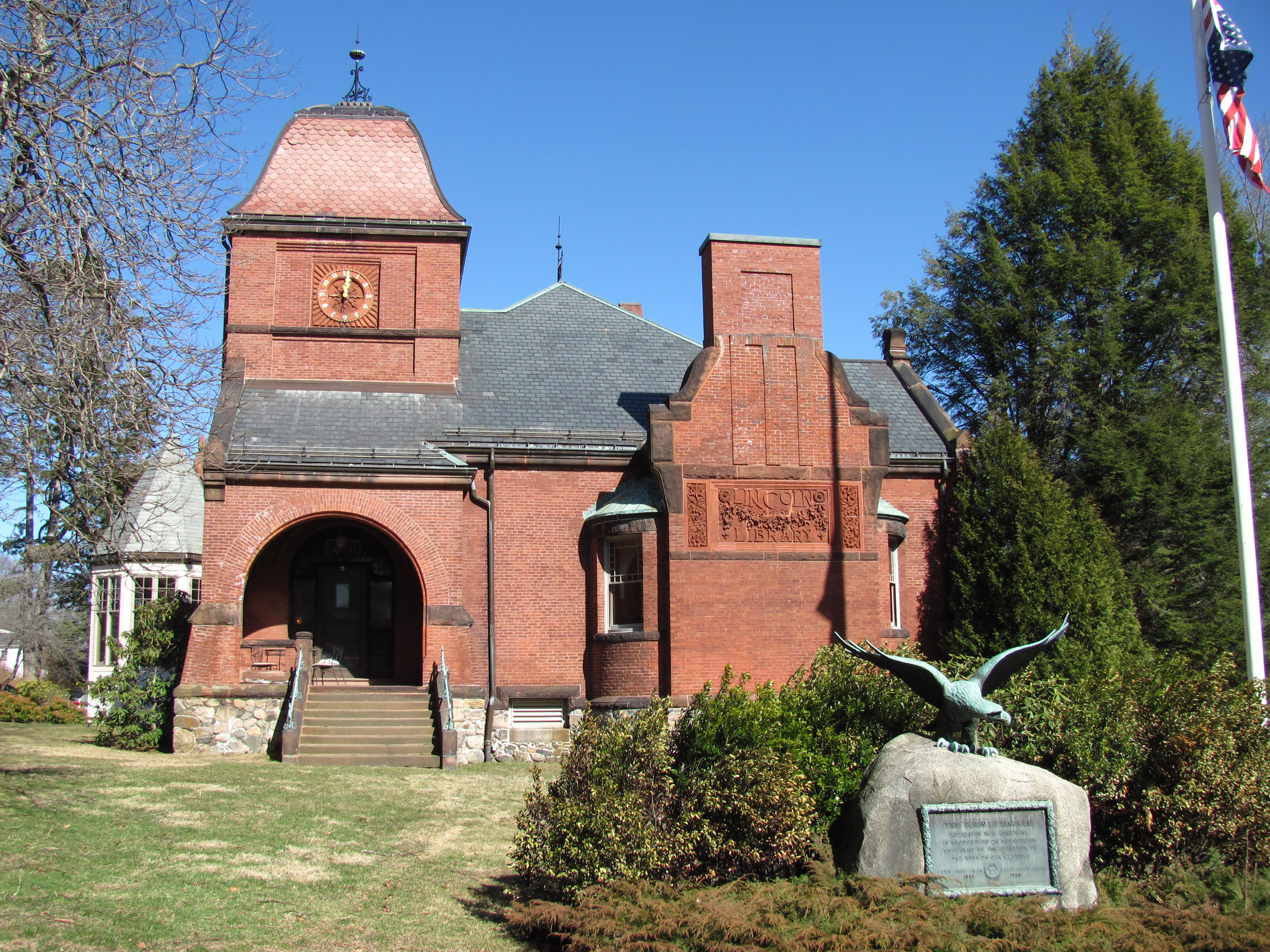
- Lincoln Public Library in 2010
- Location: Lincoln, Massachusetts, United States of America
- Type: Public Library
- Established: 1851
- Architect: William G. Preston
- Branches: 1

Access and use
- Population served: 6,400 (2010 census)

Other information
- Website: https://www.lincolnpl.org/

Lincoln Public Library is a public library at 3 Bedford Road in Lincoln, Massachusetts. The library collection began in the late 1700s with a private subscription library started by Reverend Charles Stearns, and later a donation by Eliza Farrar of her husband, Professor John Farrar's library collection. In 1884, George Grosvenor Tarbell, a Boston businessman, donated funds to construct the current Queen Anne style building of reddish Longmeadow freestone, which was designed by the architect, William G. Preston. Large additions to the library were constructed in the 1950s and 1980s. The library is part of the Minuteman Library Network. It is a contributing property in the Lincoln Center Historic District, standing across Bedford Road from the First Parish Church.

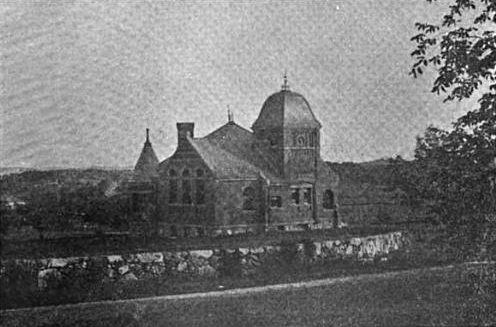
Viewed from the west in 1891
