= Jacob Barker =

American financier and lawyer (1779–1871)

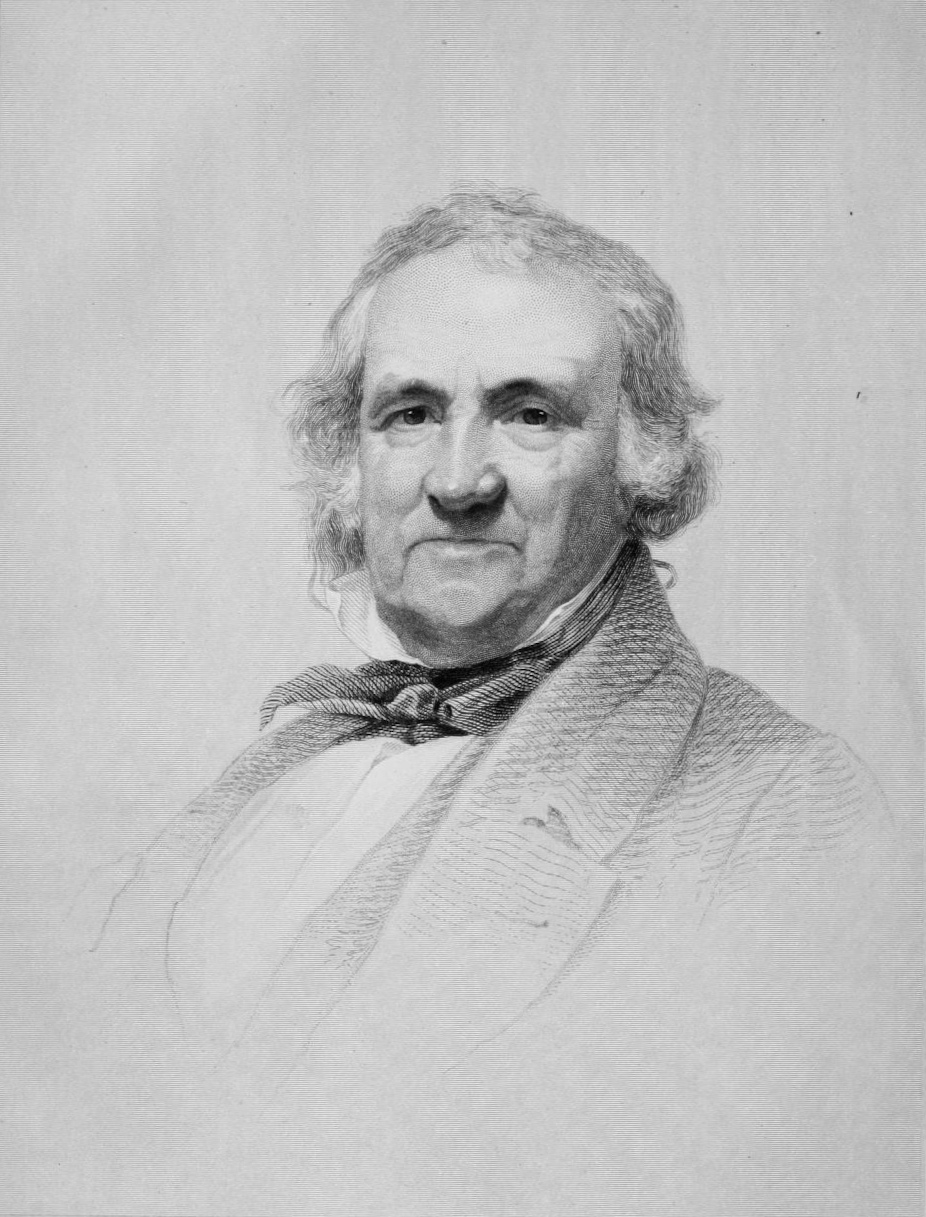

Member of the New York State Senate for the Southern District
- In office July 1, 1815 – June 30, 1816
- Preceded by: Elbert H. Jones
- Succeeded by: Walter Bowne

Personal details
- Born: December 17, 1779 Massachusetts, Massachusetts, U.S.
- Died: December 26, 1871 (aged 92) Philadelphia, Pennsylvania, U.S.
- Party: Democratic-Republican
- Spouse: Elizabeth Hazard (m. 1801; died 1866)
- Relations: Gideon Gardner (half-brother); Samuel Gray Ward (son-in-law); Wharton Barker (grandson)
- Parent(s): Sarah Folger Gardner; Robert Barker
- Occupation: Financier; lawyer; politician

Jacob Barker (December 17, 1779 – December 26, 1871) was an American financier and lawyer.

== Early life ==
He was born on December 17, 1779, in Swan's Island, Maine, of Quaker parentage. He was the son of Robert Barker and Sarah (née Folger) Gardner, who was born on Nantucket. His mother was a widow of Hezekiah Gardner, with whom she had a son, Gideon Gardner, who served as a U.S. Representative from Massachusetts. His parents married in April 1763.

He also went by JB.

Barker was an extended relation of Benjamin Franklin through his mother, who was a cousin of Franklin's mother, Abiah Folger Franklin, and grandfather Peter Folger.

== Career ==
He went to New York at the age of 16, engaged in trade, and soon amassed a considerable fortune. In May 1811, he hired Connecticut native Fitz-Greene Halleck, who remained in his employ for twenty years. Early in the War of 1812 he was instrumental in securing a loan of $5,000,000 for the national government.

In 1815, he founded the Exchange Bank of New York. He was a member of the New York State Senate in 1816, serving alongside Peter R. Livingston and Darius Crosby and representing the Southern District, which consisted of Dutchess, Kings, New York, Putnam, Queens, Richmond, Rockland, Suffolk and Westchester counties.

Subsequently, he became interested in many other large financial institutions in the city, including the New York Life and Fire Insurance Company, on the failure of which in 1826 he, with a number of others, was arrested on a charge of conspiracy to defraud. At first he acted as his own lawyer, however, eventually eminent attorneys Benjamin F. Butler and Thomas Addis Emmet (1764–1827) were counsels for his defense. The jury disagreed on the first trial and convicted Barker on the second trial; but an appeal was granted and the indictment was finally quashed.

== Preservation of Lansdowne Portrait ==
On August 23, 1814, First Lady Dolley Madison fulfilled U.S. President James Madison appeal to abandon the White House after rooftop observations confirming the British red coats approaching the horizon of the Executive Mansion. Dolley Madison directed Paul Jennings, gardener John McGraw, and John Sioussat to remove the Gilbert Stuart oil painting of Colonial America's First President George Washington from the East Room.

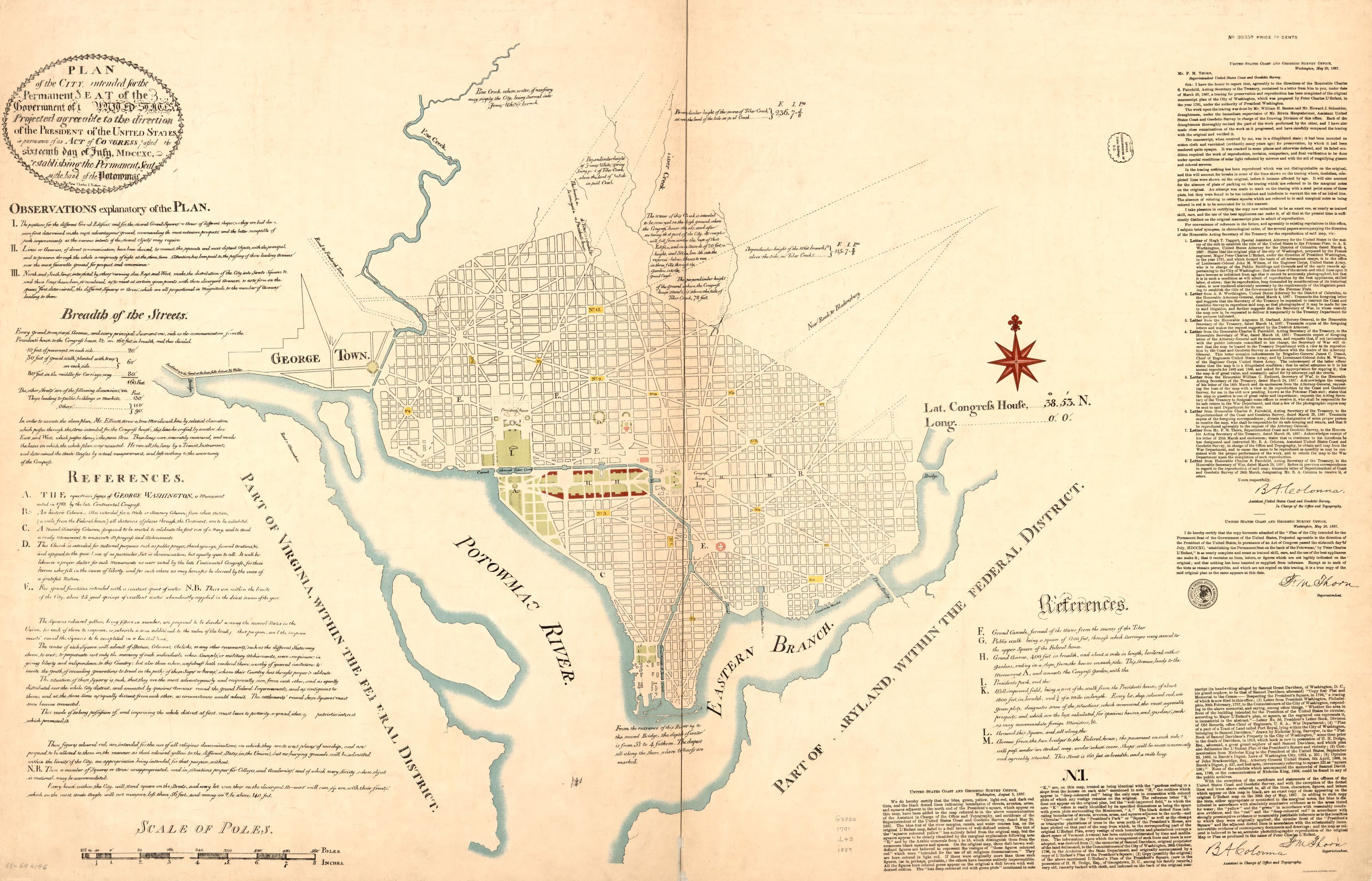
Tiber Creek Bearing North of U.S Congress House

After the removal of the iconic portrait from the White House event and reception room, the frameless life-size canvas painting was furnished to Jacob Barker and Robert Gilbert Livingston De Peyster for safe passage during the progression of the War of 1812. Mr. Barker and Mr. De Peyster routed the iconic portrait through Montgomery County while consistently distant to the boundary markers of the District of Columbia. As the daylight hours retreated and a vortex storm approached Washington City, Mr. Barker and Mr. De Peyster sought refuge for the night at a farmhouse near Tiber Creek which was a tributary of the Potomac River. The George Washington painting remained at the farmhouse as Mr. Barker and Mr. De Peyster proceeded their northern journey towards New York while eluding the British Royal Army and Naval commands who occupied the Potomac River and Chesapeake Bay territories.

On the eve to the Burning of Washington, Charles Carroll of Bellevue aided Dolley Madison's expeditious departure from the White House to the Dumbarton House occurring August 23, 1814. In 1843, Daniel Carroll, son of Charles Carroll of Bellevue, questioned the accuracy of statements published in the New York Evening Express and New York Herald concerning Charles Carroll's participation in the dismantling and removal of the Lansdowne Portrait from the White House East Room.

== New Orleans ==
He removed to New Orleans in 1834, became prominent in financial circles, was admitted to the bar, and practiced with success in insurance cases.

In the 1840s he collaborated with Rowland G. Hazard (cousin to Barker's wife, Elizabeth) to secure the release of free African Americans who were being illegally detained in Louisiana under the assumption they were escaped slaves. The jailed sailors were held without the opportunity to testify to their status as free men, or to contact those who would testify on their behalf, and would ultimately be sold at auction. Barker and Hazard were initially barred from the New Orleans jail, but obtained court orders. They succeeded in securing the freedom of a few men and persuading a New Orleans grand jury to report on the matter, but were unable to create any systemic change.

He was a majority stockholder in the first version of the St. Charles Hotel. At the close of the American Civil War he was elected to the United States Senate, but as Louisiana had not been readmitted to the Union, he was not allowed to take his seat. In 1867, he was declared bankrupt, and in 1868, he was assaulted at his home in New Orleans.

Barker published The Rebellion: Its Consequences and the Congressional Committee, Denominated the Reconstruction Committee, with their Action (1866).

== Personal life ==
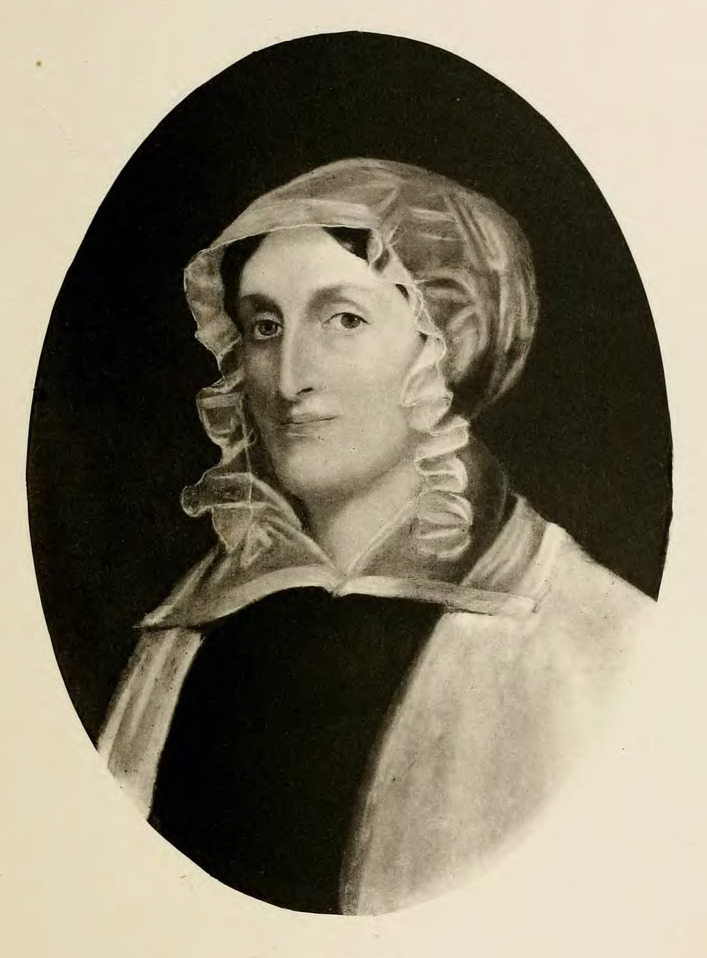
Elizabeth Hazard Barker

On August 27, 1801, Barker was married to Elizabeth Hazard. She was the daughter of Thomas Hazard Jr., a descendant of Thomas Hazard, one of the nine founding settlers of Newport, and Anna (née Rodman) Hazard. Together, they were the parents of twelve children, including:

- Robert Barker (1802–1803), who died young.
- Robert Barker (1804–1830), who died at sea.
- Thomas Barker (1807–1876), who died unmarried.
- William Hazard Barker (1809–1879), who married Jeanette B. James
- Andrew Sigourney Barker (1811–1846), who died unmarried.
- Anna Hazard Barker (1813–1900), who married Samuel Gray Ward (1817–1907).
- Jacob Barker (1816–1842), who died unmarried.
- Elizabeth Hazard Barker (1817–1878), who married Baldwin Brower, then William T. Van Zandt, then John McCaulis.
- Sarah Barker (1819–1908), who married John Caile Harrison (1812–1859), then William Henry Hunt (1823–1884), who served as the U.S. Secretary of the Navy.
- Abraham Barker (1821–1906), who married Sarah Wharton (1821–1866), then Katharine Crane.
- Mary Barker (1823–1826), who also died young.
- John Wells Baker (1825–1825), who died young.

Barker died on December 26, 1871, after spending the last few years of his life with his son in Philadelphia. He was eulogized in The New York Times as follows:

His career was a very stormy one, the qualities of the man calling down upon him the envy and malice of inferior people with whom he was brought in contact. But as an example of rectitude and upright dealings, carried consistently through the most gigantic operations and disastrous losses, there is no brighter page in the merchant annals of our country than his business life.

=== Descendants ===
Through his son Abraham, he was the grandfather of Wharton Barker (1846–1921), the Populist Party Presidential candidate in 1900.

Political offices
Preceded by Elbert H. Jones	Member of the New York State Senate for the Southern District; July 1, 1815 – June 30, 1816	Succeeded by Walter Bowne
