= William Lawrence (minister) =

American minister (1723–1780)

The Reverend William Lawrence
- Born: May 6, 1723; Groton, Province of Massachusetts Bay
- Died: April 11, 1780 (aged 56); Lincoln, Massachusetts, U.S.
- Resting place: Town Hill Cemetery, Lincoln, Massachusetts, U.S.
- Occupation: Minister

William Lawrence (May 6, 1723 – April 11, 1780) was an American Congregational minister who served as the first pastor of the Congregational Church in Lincoln, Massachusetts, for 31 years. He was noted for bringing together a divided community.

== Early life ==
Lawrence was born in 1723 in Groton, Province of Massachusetts Bay, to Colonel William Lawrence and Susanna Prescott. He was the first known born of their five known children. He was followed by Susanna, Anna, Abel and Sarah. His father was a prosperous farmer and noted blacksmith in Groton.

He attended Concord Grammar School, before entering Harvard College in 1739. After graduating four years later, he briefly became a teacher in Waltham, Province of Massachusetts Bay, and Portsmouth, Province of New Hampshire. He returned to Groton in 1745 and taught at its grammar school; he also preached that year. He then went on to study for his master's degree. He remained at college under a Hopkins fellowship.

== Ministry ==
In April 1748, Lawrence began to preach in Concord, Province of Massachusetts Bay, as part of his candidacy to become pastor at the town's newly constructed Second Precinct Church (what would become the Congregational Church in Lincoln). (Lincoln was part of Concord until 1754.) The following month, May 1748, the Church and Precinct voted 22 to 7 in favor of having Lawrence become its first minister. He was ordained on December 7.

== Personal life ==
In 1751, Lawrence married Love Adams, the daughter of one of his parishioners, with whom he had nine children between 1752 and 1771: William, Love (or Lovey), John, Susanna, Sarah, Phebe, Anna, Mary and Abel. Phebe and Mary died just over a month apart in the summer of 1812.

== Death ==
Lawrence died in 1780, aged 56. He was interred in Lincoln's Town Hill Cemetery. The town of Lincoln provided funds for his widow and family to have mourning clothes, a coffin and food for the funeral. It also bartered leather from Joshua Brooks's tannery in order for a stonecutter in Lawrence's hometown of Groton to make a stone marker. Lawrence's widow survived him by forty years and was buried alongside him. In 2005, 225 years after Lawrence's death, discussion took place about restoring Lawrence's tabletop marker.

He was succeeded in his role as Lincoln's Congregationalist minister in 1781 by Charles Stearns, who served for 45 years.
