= Eliza Ware Farrar =

American writer (1791–1870)

- Born: July 12, 1791; Dunkirk, France
- Died: April 22, 1870 (aged 78); Springfield, Massachusetts, US
- Occupation: Writer
- Spouse: John Farrar
- Writing career
- Genre: Children's literature

Eliza Ware Farrar (July 12, 1791– April 22, 1870) was an American writer who wrote several books in children's literature.

== Early years ==
Eliza was born in Dunkirk, France, as Eliza Ware Rotch to Benjamin and Elizabeth Rotch who were a family of successful whaling merchants. During her early life, she and her family left France during the French Revolution and moved to England where she was educated. Due to bad investments, her family lost everything and she was sent to New Bedford, Massachusetts, to live with her grandparents. Here, she was an active member of the Friends Meeting, a religious society for Quakers; however, she was eventually disowned by this organization for her liberal views as a New Light.

== Career ==
In 1828, she married John Farrar, a professor of mathematics at Harvard.

Between the years 1830 and 1837, Eliza was most active in her writing, and most of her works were published in Boston, Massachusetts. With these publications, she was recorded as Mrs. John Farrar, but even still she was a known name and revered as a respectable individual based on her works. In 1834, she appeared in the American Annals of Education for the announcement of her upcoming book The Letter-Writer. Although there is not a public version available, Eliza also wrote "Memorials of the Life of Elizabeth Rotch, Being the Recollections of a Mother, by her Daughter, Eliza Farrar." This memorial, along with a collection of correspondences between Eliza and her family, is held by the New Bedford Whaling Museum, and the Massachusetts Historical Society also has a collection of the Rotch's which includes personal correspondences of Eliza.

From here, Eliza Ware Farrar disappeared from recorded public life for an extended period of time while she tended to her husband in the final years of his life. After his death in 1853, she returned to release Recollections of Seventy Years in which she discuses her life in an autobiographical fashion.

In 1870, Eliza died while she was in Springfield, Massachusetts, seeking medical attention. Farrar donated her husband's collection of books to form the original collection of the Lincoln Public Library.

== Selected works ==
- The Children's Robinson Crusoe (Boston, 1830) - coauthored with Defoe Daniel
- The Story of the life of Lafayette (1831)
- John Howard (Cambridge, 1833)
- Youth's Letter-Writer (1834)
- The Adventures of Congo in Search of his Master (Boston, 1835) - coauthored with William Gardnier
- The Young Lady’s Friend (Boston, 1836)
- Recollections of Seventy Years (Boston, 1866)
