= Town Hill Cemetery =

Cemetery in Lincoln, Massachusetts, U.S.

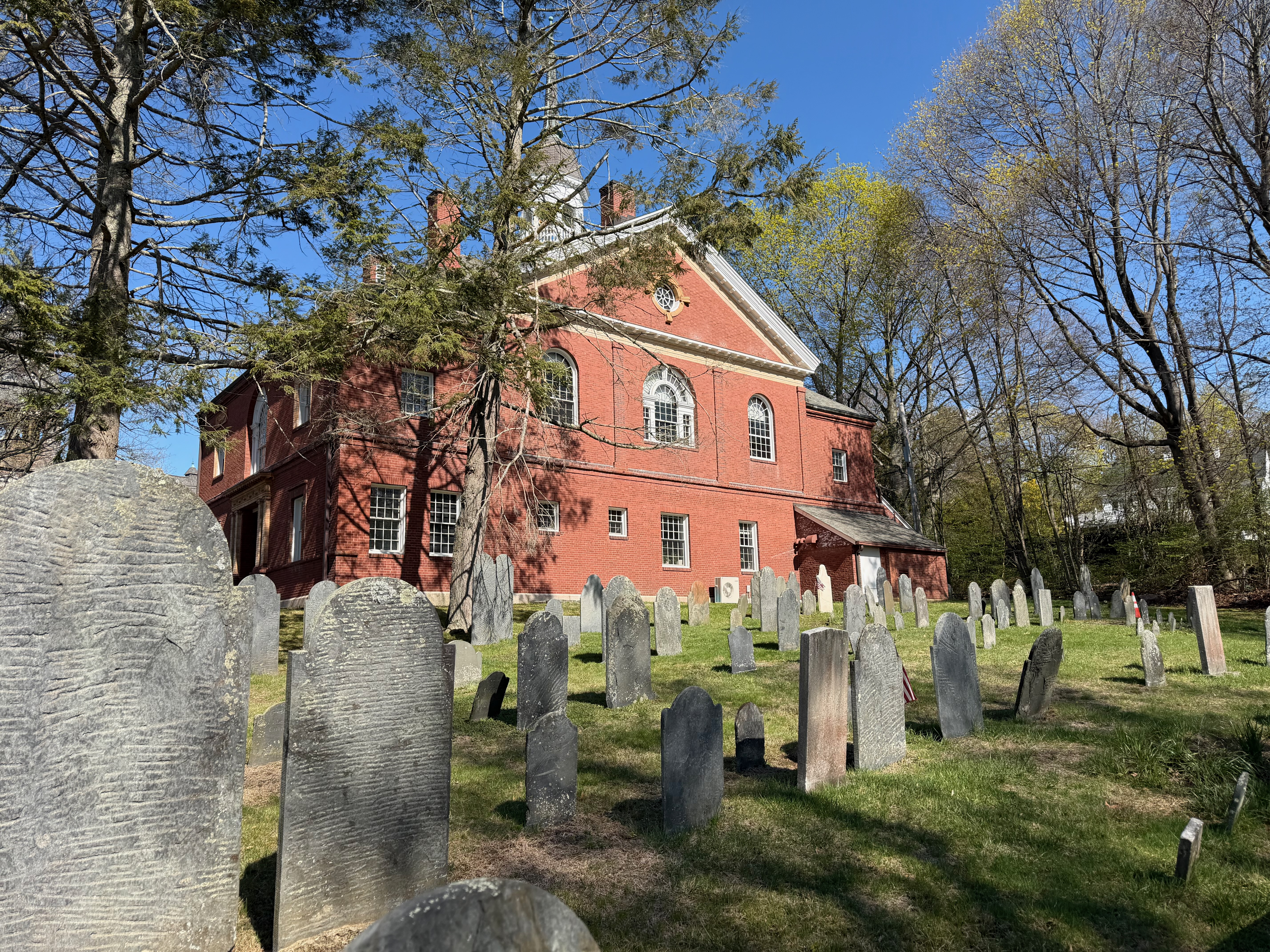
- Looking west toward Bemis Hall
- Interactive map of Town Hill Cemetery

Details
- Established: 1756 (270 years ago)
- Location: Bedford Road, Lincoln, Massachusetts, U.S.
- Country: United States
- Coordinates: 42.427653°N 71.302189°W
- Owned by: Town of Lincoln
- Find a Grave: Town Hill Cemetery

Town Hill Cemetery (formerly known as the Meeting House Burial Ground) is a cemetery in Lincoln, Massachusetts, United States. Dating to 1756 (two years after Lincoln was incorporated), but not officially adopted until 1773, it was the second cemetery established by the town, after Precinct Burial Ground (also known as Lincoln Cemetery or Old Burying Ground). It is located behind Bemis Hall, on Bedford Road but can also be accessed from Old Lexington Road, at the bottom of the slope on which the cemetery stands. Bemis Hall was built in 1892, across Bedford Road from the site of the original meetinghouse.

The cemetery contains interments of significant people involved in the Revolutionary War, including minutemen, while Reverend Charles Stearns (1753–1826), was the pastor of the town's Congregational church for 45 years. His predecessor, Rev. William Lawrence (1723–1780), is also buried there.
