= John Farrar (scientist) =

American mathematician and scientist

- Born: July 1, 1779; Lincoln, Massachusetts
- Died: May 8, 1853 (aged 73); Cambridge, Massachusetts
- Education: Phillips Academy, Andover; Harvard University
- Scientific career
- Fields: Mathematics, philosophy
- Workplaces: Harvard College

Signature
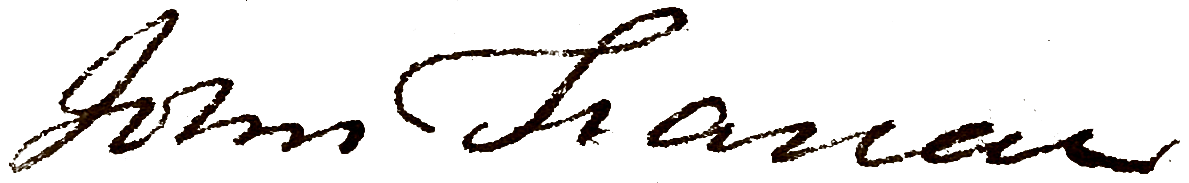

John Farrar (July 1, 1779 – May 8, 1853) was an American scholar who coined the concept of hurricanes as “a moving vortex and not the rushing forward of a great body of the atmosphere”, after the Great September Gale of 1815. Farrar remained Professor of Mathematics and Natural Philosophy at Harvard University between 1807 and 1836. During this time, he introduced modern mathematics into the curriculum. He was also a regular contributor to the scientific journals.

== Life and works ==
After attending Phillips Academy, Andover, and graduating from Harvard in 1803. In 1805, he was appointed Greek tutor at Harvard. Farrar was chosen Hollis Professor of Mathematics and Natural Philosophy in 1807. He retained the chair till 1836, when he resigned in consequence of a painful illness that finally caused his death. His second wife, Eliza Ware Farrar (née Rotch), was Flemish. She married him in 1828. She authored several children's books.

Farrar maintained weather records between 1807 and 1817 at Cambridge, Massachusetts. For the 23 September 1815 hurricane, he particularly noted the shape as "a moving vortex". He also observed the veering of the wind, and its different times of subsequent impacts on the cities of Boston and New York City.

Farrar was elected a Fellow of the American Academy of Arts and Sciences in 1808, and a member of the American Antiquarian Society in 1814.

In 1815, Farrar made efforts to build an observatory at Harvard. However, despite continuing efforts, the project failed to take off due to lack of funds. In his capacity as Hollis Professor of Mathematics and Natural Philosophy, he reformulated the mathematical curriculum and introduced modern mathematics. He prepared the Cambridge mathematical series. He was also the first to translate mathematical works from European languages to make them available for American undergraduates. He published a translation of Lacroix's "Elements of Algebra" (1818), which he followed by selections from Legendre, Biot, Bezant, and others. Harvard, the U.S. military academy, and other institutions at once adopted these works as textbooks. He regularly wrote for the scientific journals North American Review and Memoirs of the American academy. After Farrar's death, Eliza Farrar donated her husband's collection of books to form the original collection of the Lincoln Public Library.

== Notes ==
Academic offices
| Preceded by Samuel Webber | Hollis Chair of Mathematics and Natural Philosophy; 1807-1838 | Succeeded by Joseph Lovering |
