= First Parish Church (Lincoln, Massachusetts) =

Church in Massachusetts, United States

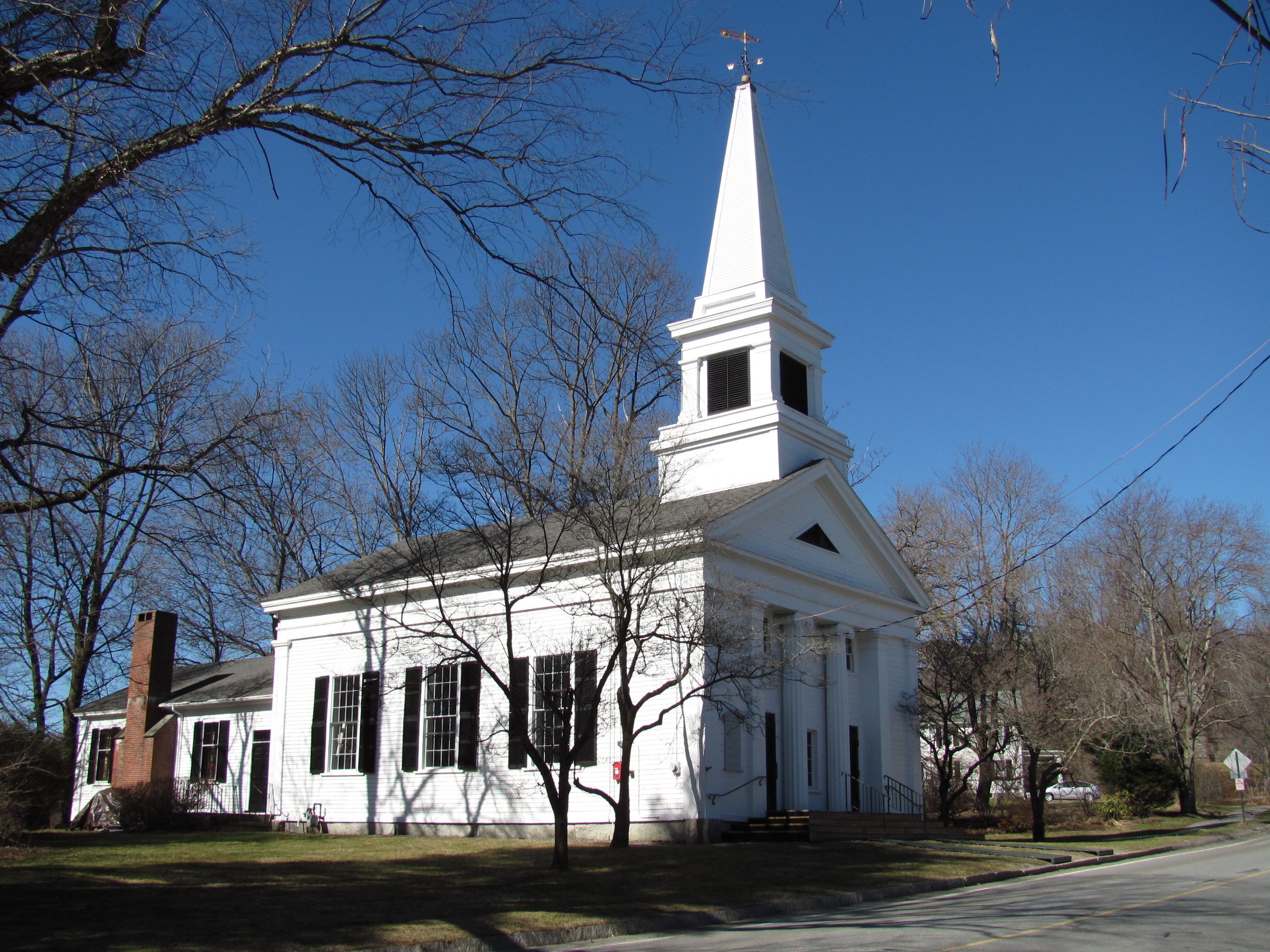
- Pictured in 2010

- Location within Massachusetts Location within the United States
- 42.426388°N 71.303716°W
- Location: 4 Bedford Road; Lincoln, Massachusetts, U.S.

Architecture
- Architectural type: Italianate
- Completed: 1842 (184 years ago)

Clergy
- Pastor(s): Reverend Nate Klug and Reverent Kit Novotny

The First Parish Church of Lincoln, Massachusetts, United States, is located in the Lincoln Center Historic District. The historic district was added to the National Register of Historic Places in 1985. It is the third church building within a few hundred yards since the establishment of the Meetinghouse in 1747, when its location was within Concord (Lincoln was incorporated in 1754). The First Parish Church was completed in 1842. The meetinghouse burned down in 1859.

In 1942, exactly a century after the church was completed, the Unitarian and Congregationalists united after a century-long split to become today's First Parish.

The church's Parish House and Sunday School is located a short distance directly to the north, at 14 Bedford Road.

As of 2026, the church has two co-ministers: Reverend Nate Klug and Reverent Kit Novotny.
