= Bemis Hall (Lincoln, Massachusetts) =

Coordinates: 42°25′39.8″N 71°18′8.7″W

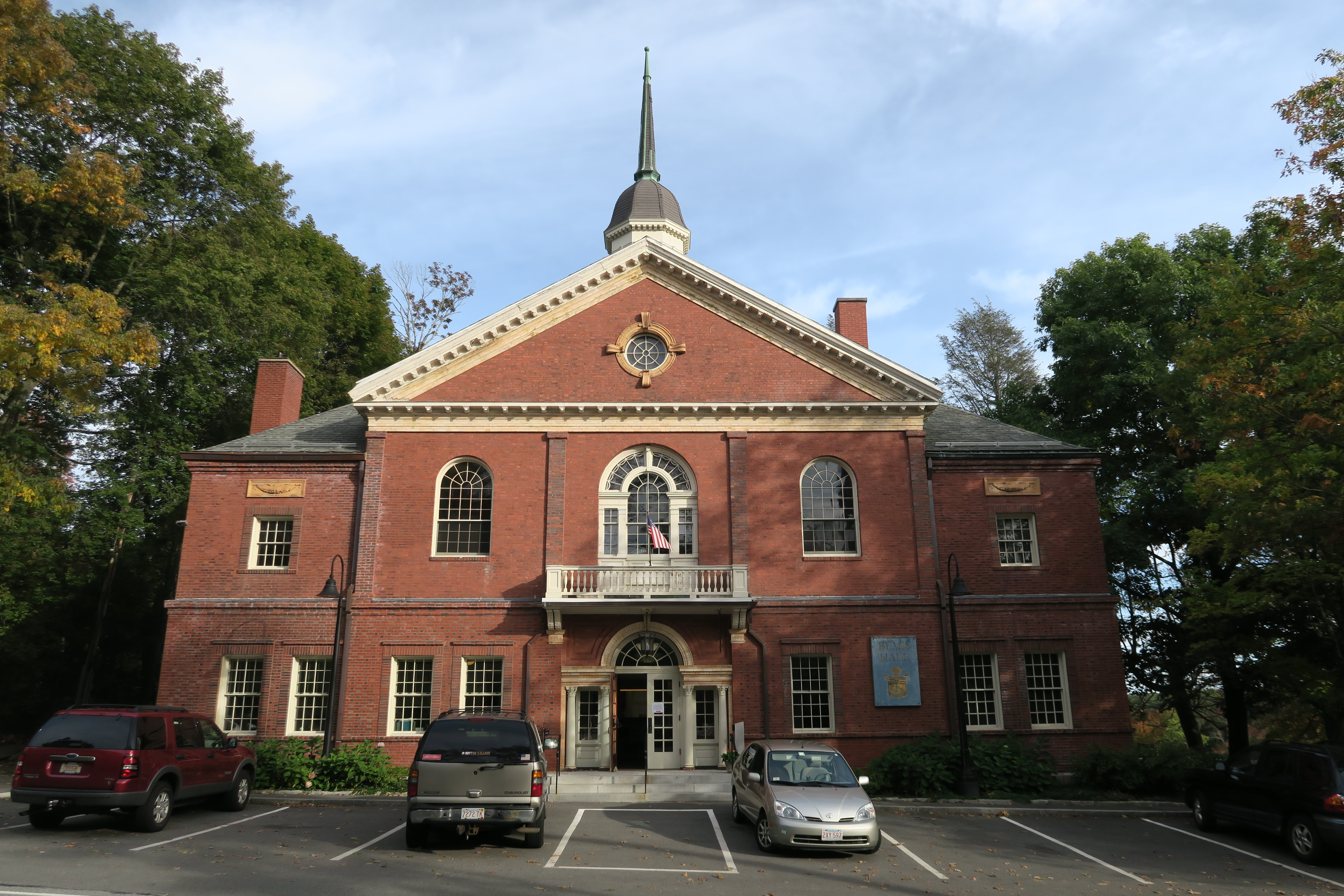
Bemis Hall

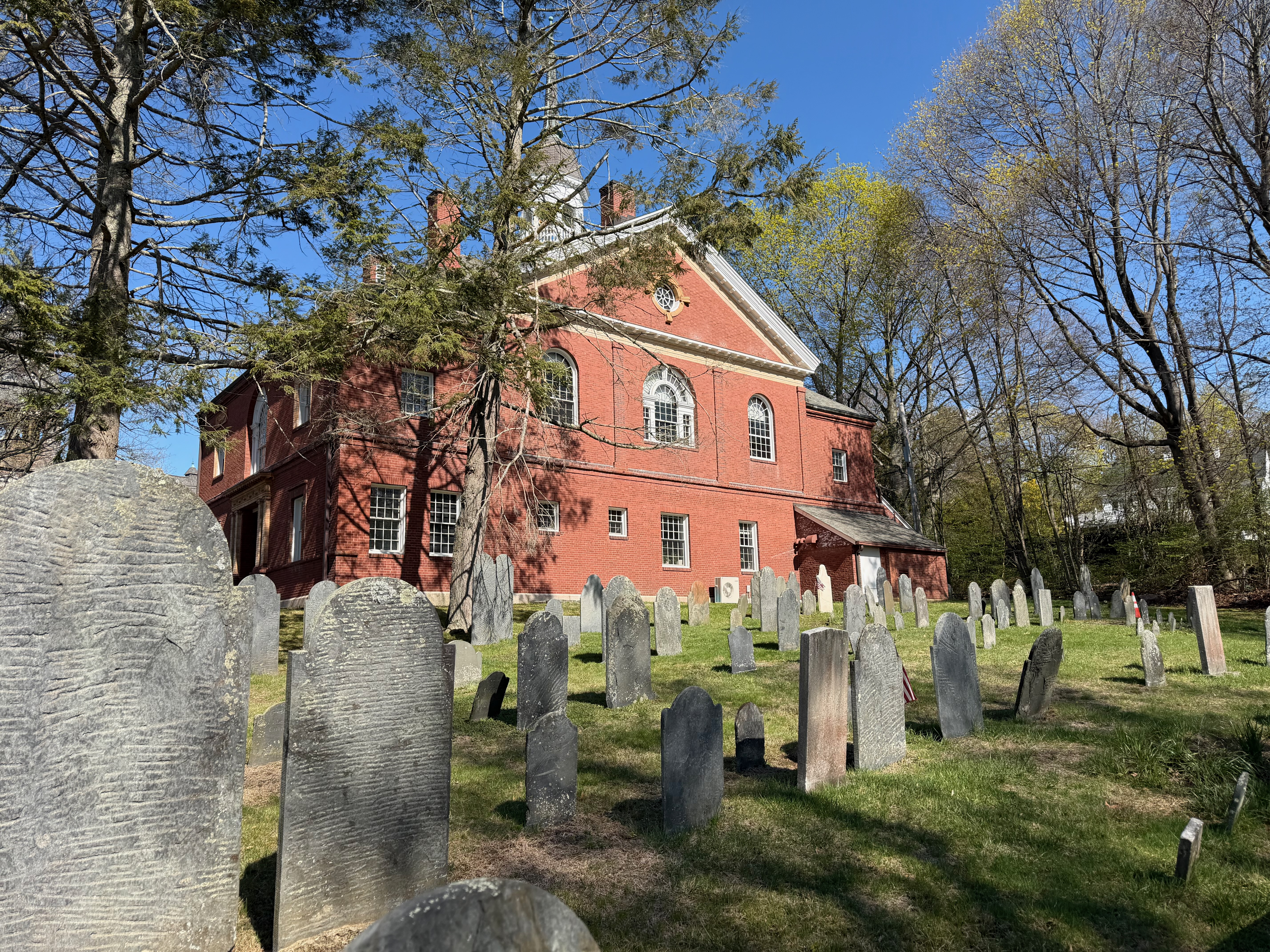
Town Hill Cemetery is located behind Bemis Hall

Bemis Hall is the home of the Bemis Lecture Series and the offices of the Lincoln Council on Aging, and is located in the town of Lincoln, Massachusetts. It was dedicated in May 1892 as part of the will of George Bemis. In the will, Bemis stipulated that the town build,

"...a new Town Hall in which shall be a room of sufficient capacity and proper construction for public lectures...and to provide an annual course of public lectures in said Hall of an instructive and elevating character."

The building was designed by Boston architect Herbert Langford Warren.

Behind the building is Town Hill Cemetery, which was established in 1756.
