= National Register of Historic Places listings in Concord, Massachusetts =

This is a list of places on the National Register of Historic Places in Concord, Massachusetts.

This National Park Service list is complete through NPS recent listings posted June 19, 2026.

== Concord ==
	Name on the Register	Image	Date listed	Location	Description
1	Col. James Barrett Farm	Col. James Barrett Farm	November 15, 1973 (#73000290)	448 Barrett's Mill Rd. 42°28′55″N 71°22′54″W	
2	Col. Roger Brown House	Col. Roger Brown House	January 27, 1983 (#83000785)	1694 Main St. 42°27′11″N 71°24′33″W	
3	Concord Armory	Concord Armory	September 12, 2007 (#07000945)	51 Walden St. 42°27′32″N 71°20′58″W	
4	Concord Monument Square-Lexington Road Historic District	Concord Monument Square-Lexington Road Historic District	September 13, 1977 (#77000172)	Massachusetts Route 2A; 42°27′34″N 71°20′51″W	Also included Concord's Colonial Inn
5	Dr. John Cuming House	Dr. John Cuming House	November 11, 1977 (#77000175)	West of Concord at Barretts Mill Rd. and Reformatory Circle; 42°28′02″N 71°23′47″W	At 998 Elm Street
6	Damon Mill	Damon Mill	May 25, 1979 (#79000360)	9 Pond Lane; 42°27′12″N 71°24′35″W	
7	Isaac Davis Trail	Isaac Davis Trail	April 11, 1972 (#72001347)	Running east-west between the towns of Acton and Concord; 42°28′48″N 71°23′57″W	
8	Ralph Waldo Emerson House	Ralph Waldo Emerson House	October 15, 1966 (#66000365)	18 Cambridge Turnpike; 42°27′27″N 71°20′39″W	National Historic Landmark
9	Jonathan Hildreth House	Jonathan Hildreth House	April 3, 1991 (#91000362)	8 Barrett's Mill Rd. 42°28′27″N 71°21′56″W	
10	Hosmer Homestead	Hosmer Homestead	June 3, 1999 (#99000659)	138 Baker Ave. 42°27′41″N 71°23′05″W	
11	Joseph Hosmer House	Joseph Hosmer House	March 9, 1990 (#90000170)	572 Main St. 42°27′26″N 71°22′13″W	
12	Hubbard-French District	Hubbard-French District	June 15, 2000 (#00000686)	324 and 342 Sudbury Rd. 42°27′05″N 71°21′35″W	
13	Minute Man National Historical Park	Minute Man National Historical Park	October 15, 1966 (#66000935)	From Concord to Lexington on Massachusetts Route 2A; 42°28′09″N 71°21′01″W	Boundary increase (added 2002-11-29): Lexington, MA
14	Old Manse	Old Manse	October 15, 1966 (#66000775)	Monument St. 42°28′06″N 71°20′58″W	National Historic Landmark
15	Orchard House	Orchard House	October 15, 1966 (#66000781)	Lexington Rd. 42°27′32″N 71°20′08″W	National Historic Landmark
16	Parkman Tavern	Parkman Tavern	June 19, 1979 (#79000358)	South of Concord at 20 Powder Mill Rd. 42°25′46″N 71°22′36″W	
17	Pest House	Pest House	April 18, 1977 (#77000174)	153 Fairhaven Rd. 42°26′51″N 71°21′38″W	
18	Thomas Mott Shaw Estate	Thomas Mott Shaw Estate	November 20, 1987 (#87001395)	317 Garfield Rd. 42°25′42″N 71°21′49″W	
19	Sleepy Hollow Cemetery	Sleepy Hollow Cemetery	August 19, 1998 (#98000991)	34A Bedford St. 42°27′52″N 71°20′42″W	
20	Thoreau-Alcott House	Thoreau-Alcott House	July 12, 1976 (#76000247)	255 Main St. 42°27′30″N 71°21′30″W	
21	Union Station	Union Station	March 2, 1989 (#89000143)	20 Commonwealth Ave. 42°27′24″N 71°23′40″W	
22	Walden Pond	Walden Pond	October 15, 1966 (#66000790)	1.5 mi (2.4 km) south of Concord; 42°26′20″N 71°20′20″W	National Historic Landmark
23	The Wayside	The Wayside	July 11, 1980 (#80000356)	455 Lexington Rd. 42°27′33″N 71°20′02″W	National Historic Landmark
24	Wheeler-Harrington House	Wheeler-Harrington House	July 23, 2013 (#13000534)	249 Harrington Ave. 42°26′57″N 71°24′12″W	
25	Wheeler-Minot Farmhouse	Wheeler-Minot Farmhouse	March 19, 2004 (#04000190)	341 Virginia Rd. 42°28′10″N 71°18′41″W	
26	Wheeler-Merriam House	Wheeler-Merriam House	November 26, 1982 (#82000493)	477 Virginia Rd. 42°28′06″N 71°18′28″W	
27	Wright's Tavern	Wright's Tavern	October 15, 1966 (#66000793)	Lexington Road opposite the Burying Ground; 42°27′36″N 71°20′57″W	National Historic Landmark
