= West Concord station =

Rail station in Massachusetts, US

West Concord
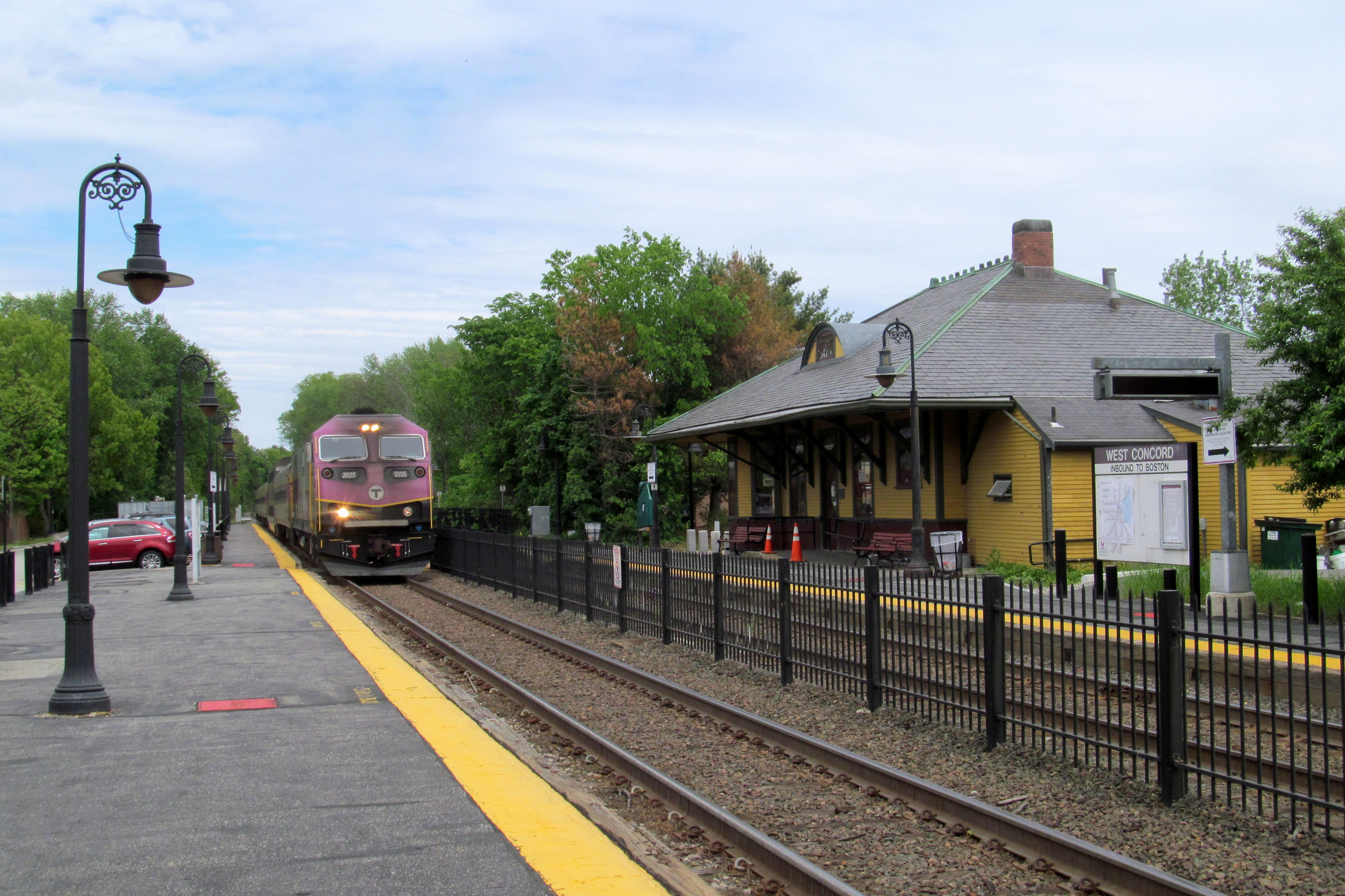
- An outbound train at West Concord station in 2017

General information
- Location: Commonwealth Avenue and Main Street; West Concord, Concord, Massachusetts
- Owner: Massachusetts Bay Transportation Authority
- Line: Fitchburg Line
- Platforms: 2 side platforms
- Tracks: 2

Construction
- Parking: 146 spaces
- Cycle facilities: 10 spaces
- Accessible: Yes

Other information
- Fare zone: 5

History
- Opened: 1871
- Rebuilt: 1894
- Former names: Union Station, Concord Junction

Passengers
- 2024: 263 daily boardings

Services
Preceding station	MBTA	Following station
South Acton toward Wachusett	Fitchburg Line	Concord toward North Station
- Union Station
- U.S. National Register of Historic Places
- Coordinates: 42°27′24.8″N 71°23′34.7″W
- Built: 1894
- Architectural style: Queen Anne style
- NRHP reference No.: 89000143
- Added to NRHP: March 2, 1989
Location

West Concord station is an MBTA Commuter Rail station located in West Concord, Massachusetts. It is served by the Fitchburg Line. The station has two side platforms serving the line's two tracks, with mini-high platforms for accessibility. The adjacent station building, now a restaurant, is not used for railroad purposes.

Concord Junction station opened in 1871 at the junction of the Fitchburg Railroad and the Framingham and Lowell Railroad, replacing an earlier station at Damon Mill to the west. It soon became an important railroad junction, and a new union station was built in 1894. Passenger service declined during the 20th century, though commuter service to Boston was retained. The station and surrounding village were renamed as West Concord in 1927. The interior of the station building was restored in the 1980s; it was listed on the National Register of Historic Places in 1989 as Union Station. The exterior was restored with the original tri-color paint scheme in the 2000s. Since 1990, the building has been used as a restaurant, Club Car Cafe.

== History ==
=== Union Station ===
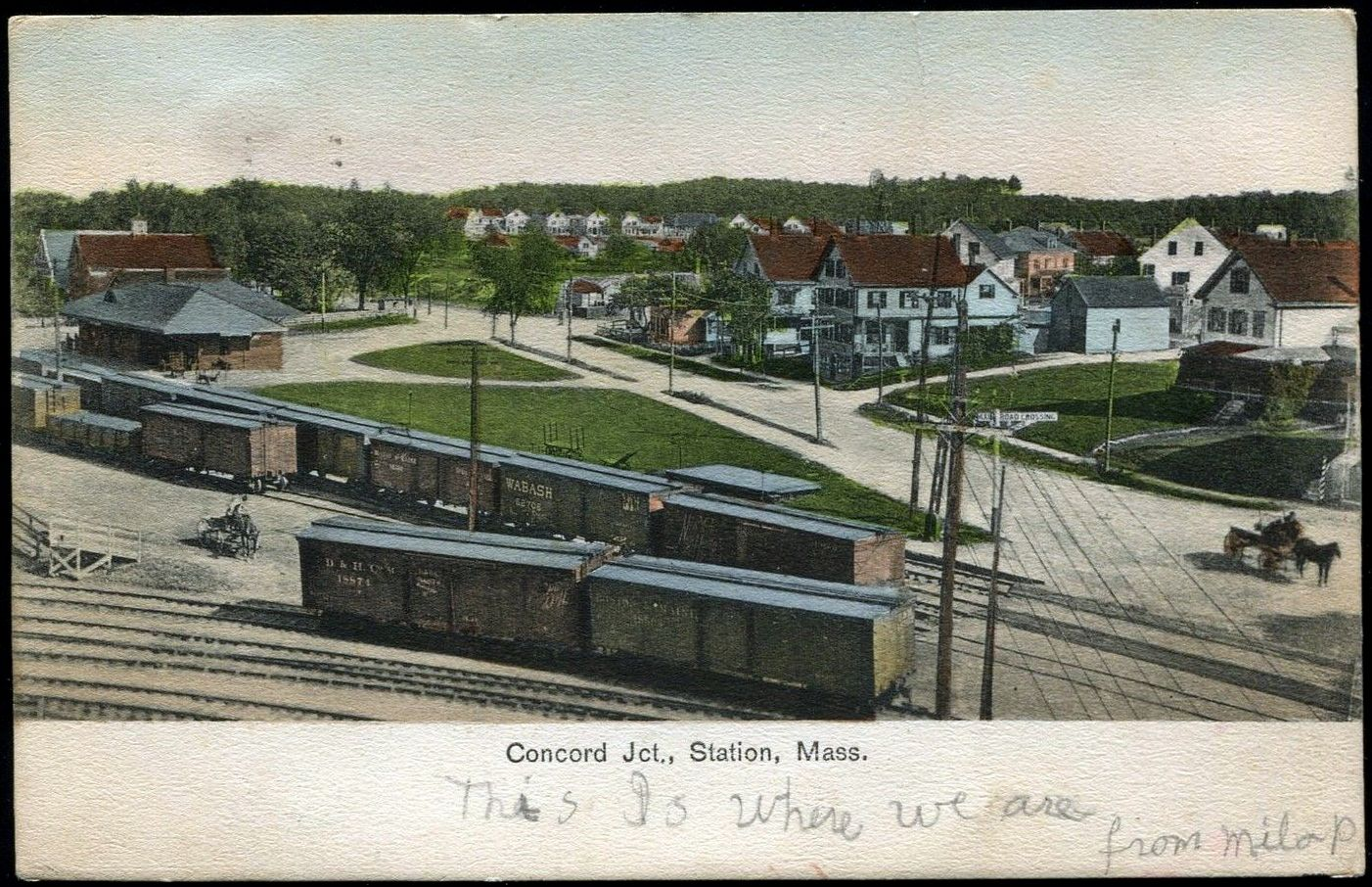
An early-20th-century postcard of Concord Junction

The Fitchburg Railroad opened through Concord in 1844; a station was located at Damon Mill west of the modern station location. When the Framingham and Lowell Railroad (F&L) opened in 1871, Concord Junction station was established where the two lines crossed in the Warnerville section of Concord. The small station was soon joined by a freight house, engine house, and turntable. The Nashua, Acton and Boston Railroad opened in 1873, with trackage rights over the F&L to Concord Junction. The railroad offered Concord Junction–Nashua service timed to meet Fitchburg Railroad trains, making Concord Junction an important transfer point. In 1882, the state legislature allowed the installation of automatic signals when different railroads crossed at grade. Since 1855, trains had been required to stop at such crossings. Signals were installed at Concord Junction in 1884.

Industrial activity in Concord soon clustered around the three railroad lines; by the 1890s, Concord Junction was a busier village center than Concord itself, with 125 trains stopping per day. The new Union Station opened in January 1894; the older wooden station was reused as a boardinghouse on Derby Street. The single-story L-shaped Queen Anne style structure incorporated a passenger waiting room, freight office, and a baggage room in three separate buildings under one roof. A bay window protruded from the right angle of the station to give the stationmaster views down the rail lines. The asymmetrical design, slate roof, eyelid dormers, stained glass windows, and bright three-color paint scheme were unusual for the area. Among the regular passengers at the station was John F. Fitzgerald, who frequently used it between 1897 and 1903.

=== Decline ===
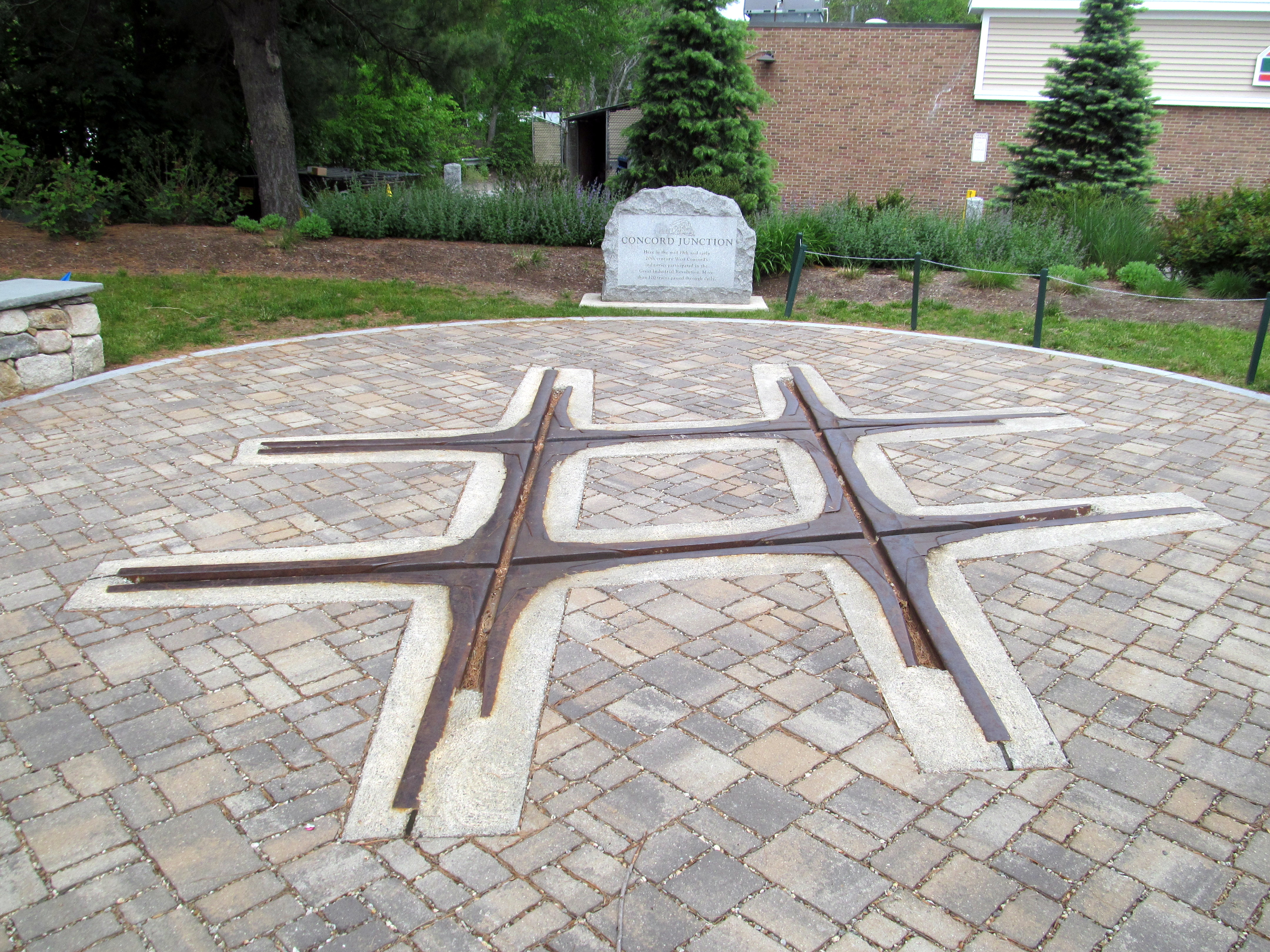
The preserved diamond crossing

The Nashua, Acton and Boston became part of the Boston and Maine Railroad in 1895, followed by the Fitchburg Railroad in 1900. The F&L went through several ownership changes; it was acquired by the Old Colony Railroad in 1879, which was leased by the New York, New Haven and Hartford Railroad in 1893. Passenger service declined in the 20th century; service to Nashua ended in 1924, and the line was abandoned the next year. Passenger service on the F&L ended in 1933, though north-south freight service through Concord Junction continued. At that time, the freight office (the northwest part of the station) and part of the roof were demolished. With passenger service only remaining on the Fitchburg mainline, in 1927 the station and village became known as West Concord. Intercity service past Fitchburg ended in 1960, leaving only commuter service to West Concord.

The Massachusetts Bay Transportation Authority (MBTA) was formed in 1964 to subsidize suburban commuter rail operations. This public funding stabilized remaining service on the Boston and Maine system in 1965. The station building was reused as a restaurant by 1968. The MBTA bought the Boston and Maine commuter assets in 1976. In 1982, a faux-brick exterior was added to the building and the space between the waiting room and baggage room was enclosed. Freight service on the ex-F&L from West Concord south to South Sudbury ended that year. The diamond crossing was soon removed and moved slightly south, where it was put on display in a small park.

=== Preservation ===
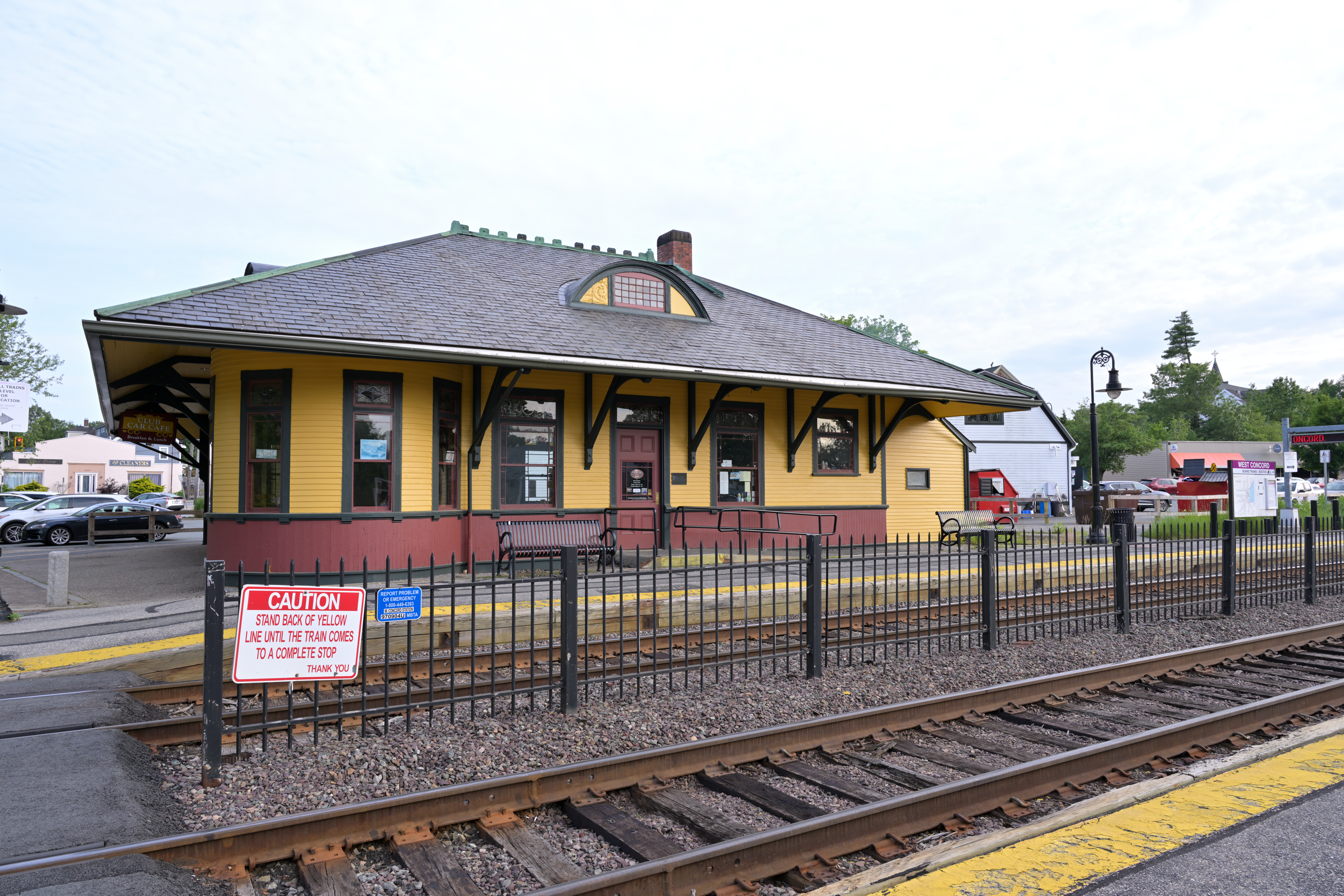
The restored station building in 2025

The station building fell into private ownership and hosted a pizza restaurant for a time; when the restaurant closed, the building was locked and did not provide passenger accommodations. In 1987, MBTA riders urged the town to purchase the building, which would help to restore access to the waiting room and restrooms, and the MBTA indicated that they would enforce a 1964 deed that required public access regardless of ownership. Representatives visited other stations nearby, including Hartford, Connecticut, to consult on how a station like West Concord could be renovated. Following successful appeals, a group of residents renovated the interior of the station. In 1989, it was added to the National Register of Historic Places as Union Station. The Club Car Cafe opened in the building in 1990; it provides a waiting room for passengers during weekday commute hours.

Freight service north of West Concord ended in 1993; the north-south line has since been converted to the Bruce Freeman Rail Trail. Mini-high platforms were installed shortly after the 1990 passage of the Americans with Disabilities Act, making West Concord one of the first MBTA Commuter Rail stations to become accessible. The Friends of the West Concord Depot group formed in 2006 to support renovations of the deteriorated station building. The town and the MBTA split the cost of exterior renovations, which restored the original tri-color exterior design. The renovations were completed around 2009.

== See also ==
- National Register of Historic Places listings in Concord, Massachusetts
