= Hosmer Homestead =

Historic house in Massachusetts, United States

- U.S. National Register of Historic Places
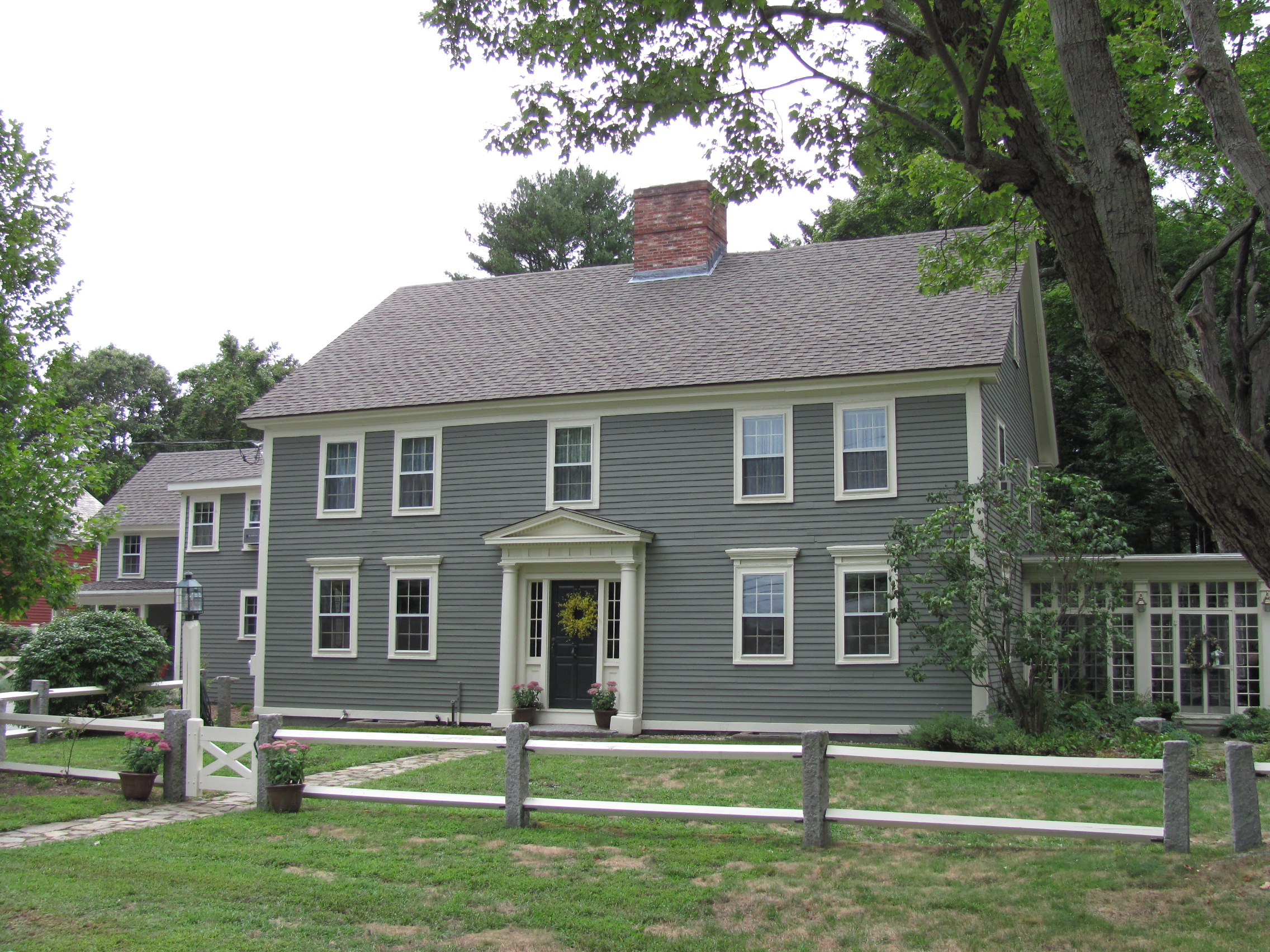

- Location within Massachusetts Location within the United States
- Location: 138 Baker Avenue, Concord, Massachusetts
- Coordinates: 42°27′41″N 71°23′5″W
- Area: 1.59 acres (0.64 ha)
- Built: 1710
- Architectural style: Georgian
- NRHP reference No.: 99000659
- Added to NRHP: June 3, 1999

The Hosmer Homestead (also known as the Hosmer/Baker Farm) is a historic house located at 138 Baker Avenue in Concord, Massachusetts.

== Description and history ==
The oldest portion of this 2 1/2-story wood-frame house was probably built c. 1710 by Stephen Hosmer, based on architectural evidence. The property has a long association with the Hosmer family, who were early settlers of Concord and who have played a significant role in the growth and civic life of the town. The house interior has well-preserved Georgian woodwork and plaster.

The house was listed on the National Register of Historic Places on June 3, 1999.

== See also ==
- Joseph Hosmer House
- National Register of Historic Places listings in Concord, Massachusetts
