= Pest House =

A pest house was a type of building in which to quarantine those afflicted with communicable diseases.

Pest House is the name of the following historic buildings in the US:

- Pest House (Concord, Massachusetts)
- Pest House (Stillwater, Minnesota)

== See also ==
- "The Pest House", an episode in the American TV series Millennium
