= Concord's Colonial Inn =

Historic inn in Massachusetts, U.S.

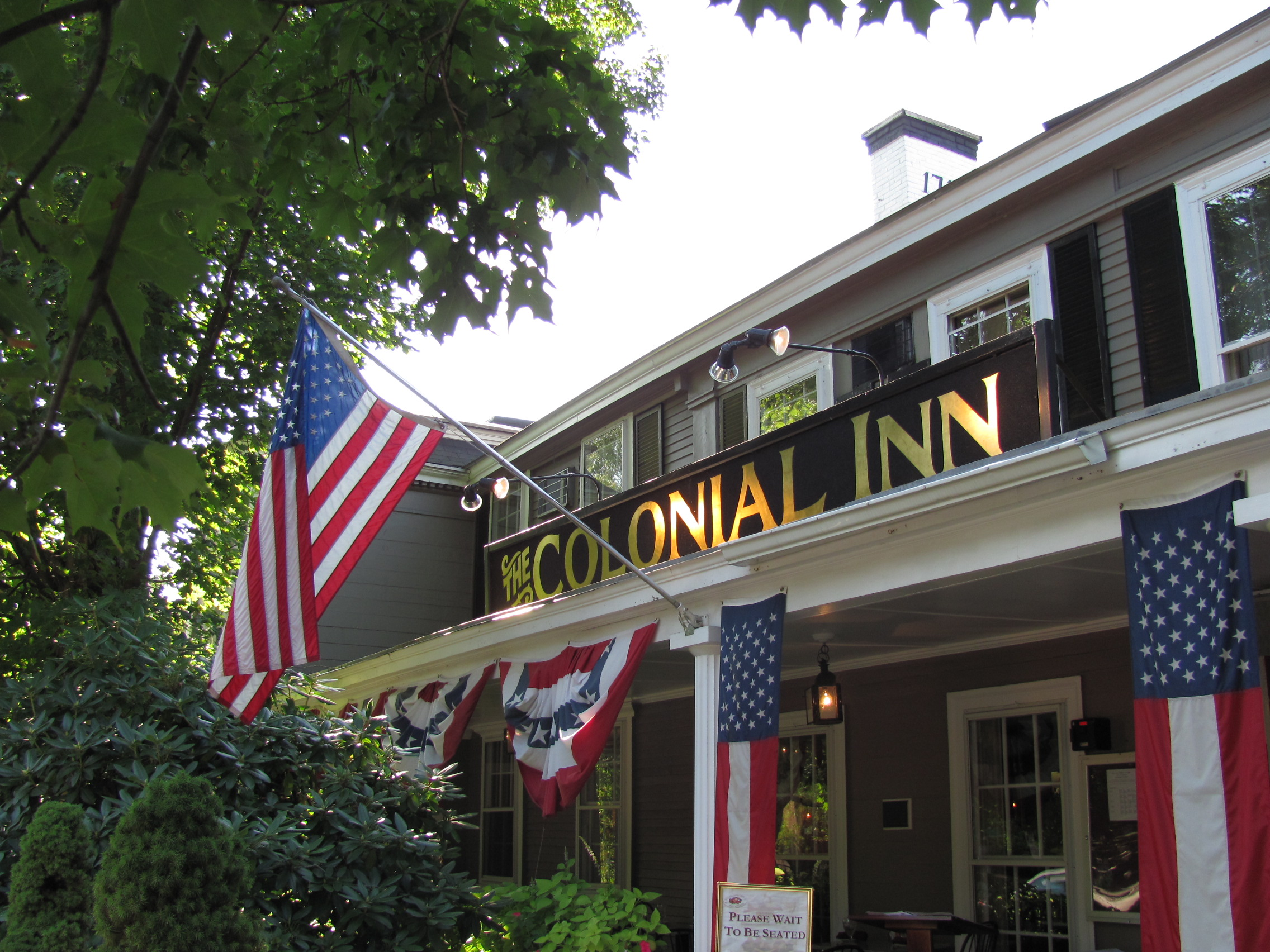
- The inn's main entrance in 2010
- Former names: Thoreau House; The Colonial House; The Colonial

General information
- Architectural style: American colonial
- Location: Concord, Massachusetts, U.S., 48 Monument Square; Concord, Massachusetts 01742
- Coordinates: 42.46179°N 71.34954°W
- Completed: 1716 (310 years ago)
- Opening: 1889 (137 years ago)
- Owner: Michael and Dorothy Harrington (since 2015)

Other information
- Number of rooms: 54
- Number of restaurants: 2
- Parking: Yes (off Lowell Street)

Website
- www.concordscolonialinn.com

Concord's Colonial Inn (also known as Colonial Inn) is a historic inn in Concord, Massachusetts. Its original structure, still in use, was built in 1716. It became a hotel in 1889.

The inn is included in the National Register of Historic Places as part of the listed Concord Monument Square–Lexington Road Historic District. It overlooks Monument Square on the square's northwestern side, and is one of the oldest properties listed on the Register.

The inn was given its current name in 1900, after being known as The Colonial House (or The Colonial) for three years, and has been a member of Historic Hotels of America since 2005.

The building was formerly three separate constructions, combined into one in 1897. The central section is today's main inn, and it was used as an ammunitions store during the Revolutionary War; the smaller of the on-site taverns, called "The Tap Room", was used as a storeroom for supplies.

== Original properties ==
Three of Concord's historic houses, formerly distinct from one another, were joined to form the current structure in 1897.

=== Thoreau House ===
The eastern section was built in 1716 by Colonel James Minot, grandfather of cabinetmaker Ammi White who lived there. The Whites sold the house in 1799 to John Thoreau, maternal grandfather of Henry David Thoreau. John died in 1801, but the property remained the home of his son John Jr. (1787–1859) and his wife Cynthia Dunbar (1787–1872). It became known as the Thoreau House in 1889, when this and the central building were purchased at auction by John Maynard Keyes and used as a boarding house and a small hotel.

=== Main building ===
In 1775, during the Revolutionary War, the central section of the structure stored arms and provisions for the Concord minutemen.

=== The White House ===
The western section was the home of Deacon John White and his wife Esther Kettell. White would detain those people who travelled on the adjacent Lowell Road on the Sabbath.

John Keyes purchased this building in 1897 and combined it with the other two, reopening as The Colonial.

== History ==
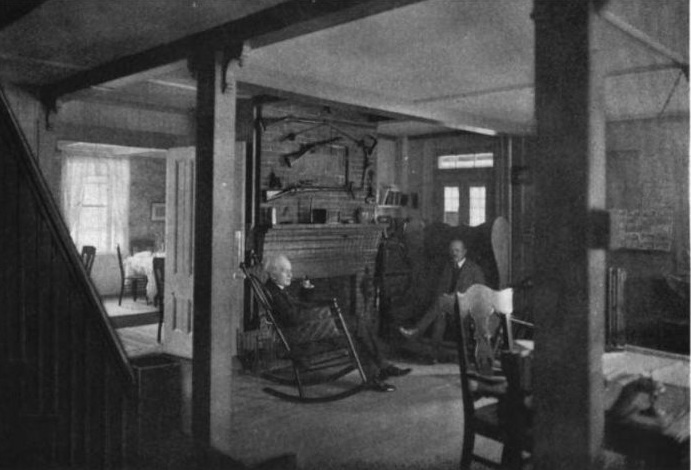
Locals keeping warm by the fire, circa 1920

Many inhabitants of Concord made the inn their winter home in the first half of the 20th century. Around that time, the proprietor was William R. Rand.

In 1960, the inn underwent a large expansion with the addition of the Prescott Wing (named for Revolutionary figure William Prescott), which doubled the number of rooms to 32. A dining room called Merchants Row was added in 1970, the name being a reference to John Thoreau, who was a merchant in Boston. The inn has a second restaurant, The Liberty, which also includes Forge Tavern.

German hotelier Jurgen Demisch purchased the hotel in 1988. He owned it for 27 years, selling it to Michael and Dorothy Harrington in 2015, a year before the original building's 300th anniversary.

== Notable visitors ==
In 1775, British spy John Howe is believed to have stayed at the inn. He was under orders from General Thomas Gage to examine the "roads, bridge, and fording places" to ascertain the best route for an army to take between Boston and Worcester "to destroy military stores deposited there." He returned via Concord, where he states that he was introduced to Major John Buttrick and others and was invited to dine with them at the tavern. His diary was published in Concord, New Hampshire, in 1827, in which he records the visit:

I was now invited to take dinner at the tavern with a number of gentlemen. The conversation at dinner was respecting the Regulars at Boston which they expected out. ... By this time we had got through dinner. After dinner we walked up to the storehouse to examine some guns. I told them I could make any they wished. Here I found a quantity of flour, arms, and ammunition. After examining the gates and doors attached to yard and storehouse, I returned to the tavern, where, after taking some brandy and water I took leave of them.

The authenticity of this source has been questioned.

Henry David Thoreau lived at the inn with his aunts between 1835 and 1837 while he studied at Harvard University. In 1972, Jacqueline Kennedy rented rooms at the inn when she visited her daughter Caroline, who was studying at Concord Academy.

== Gallery ==
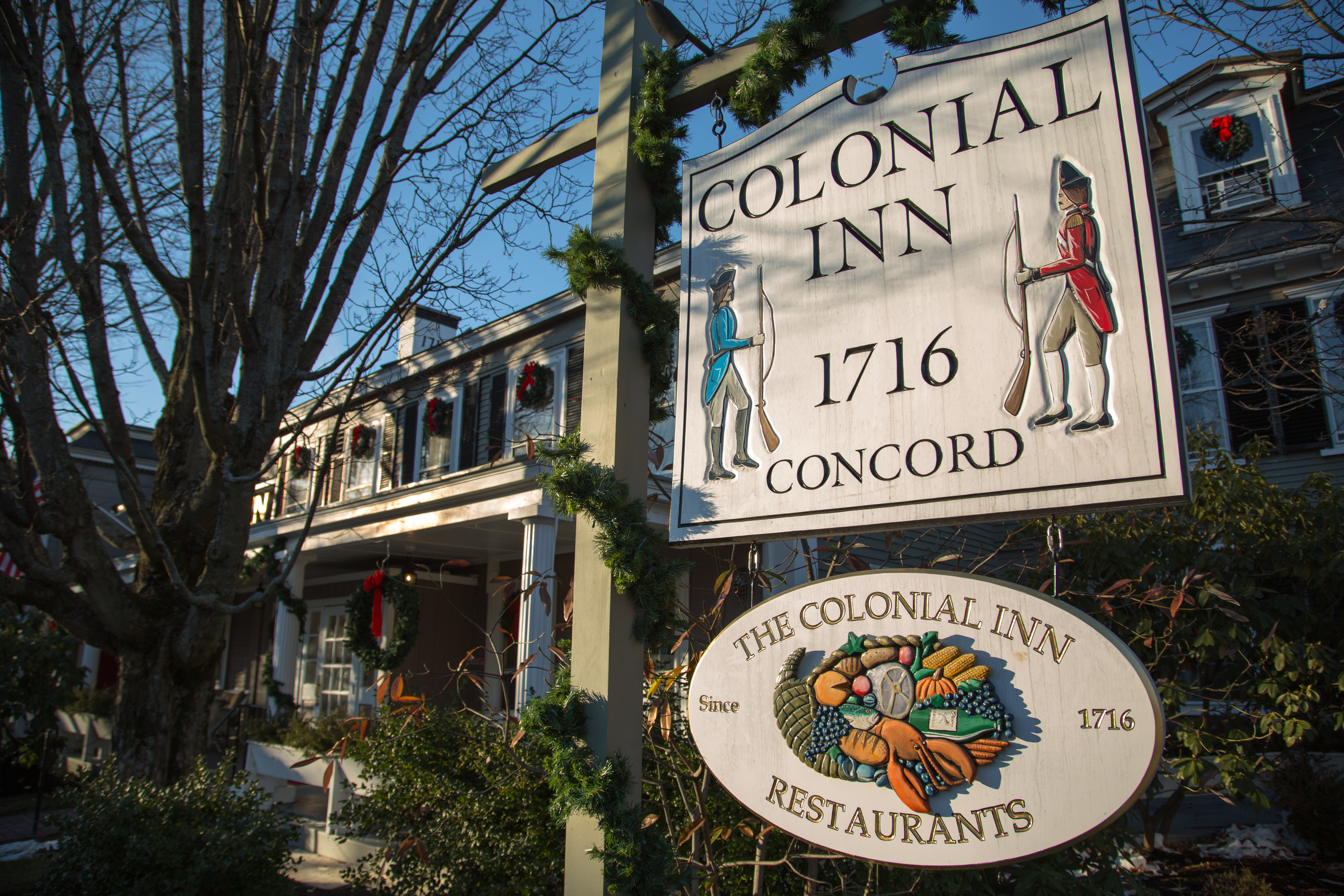
Main entrance

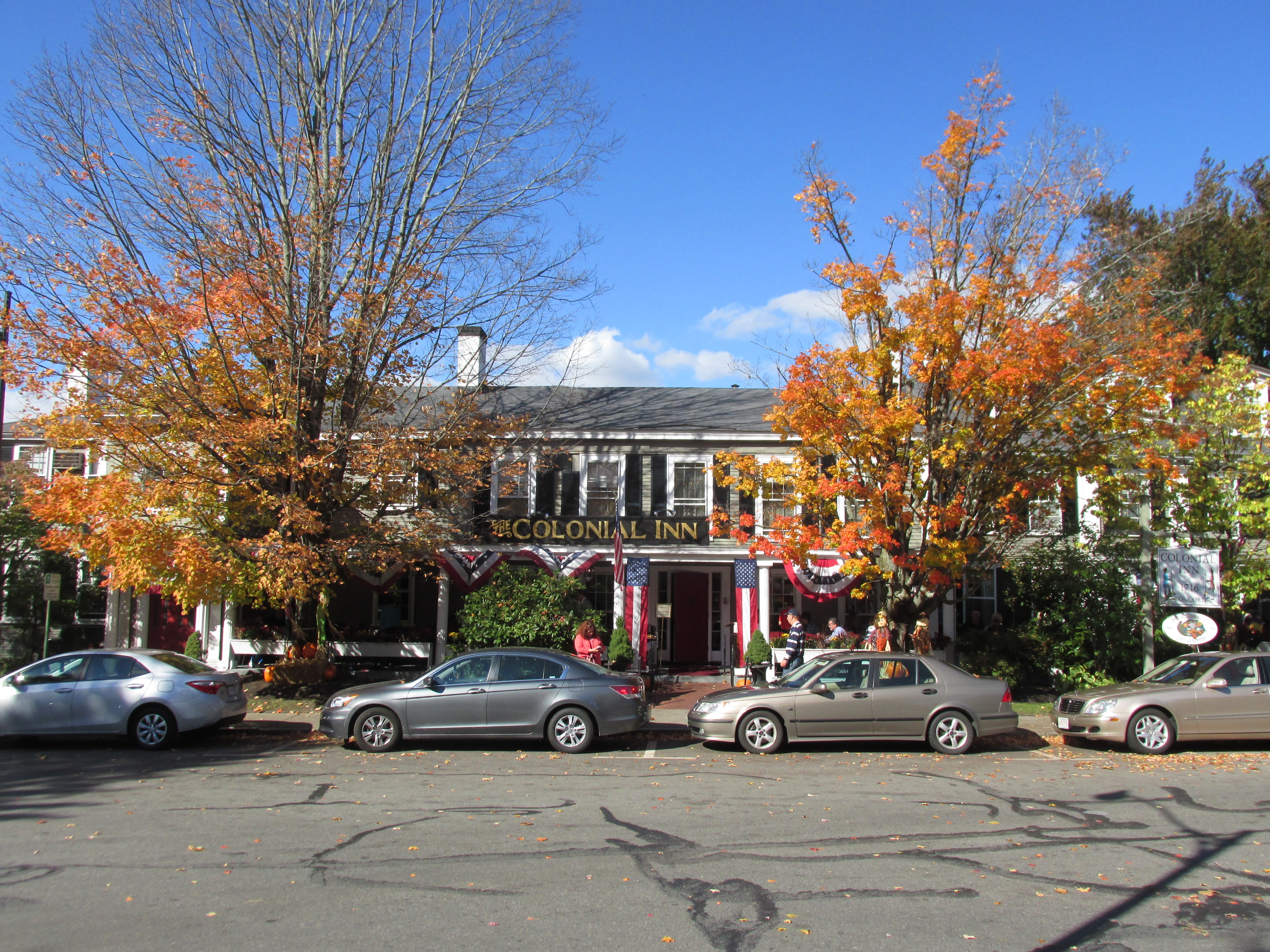
Main façade, on Monument Street

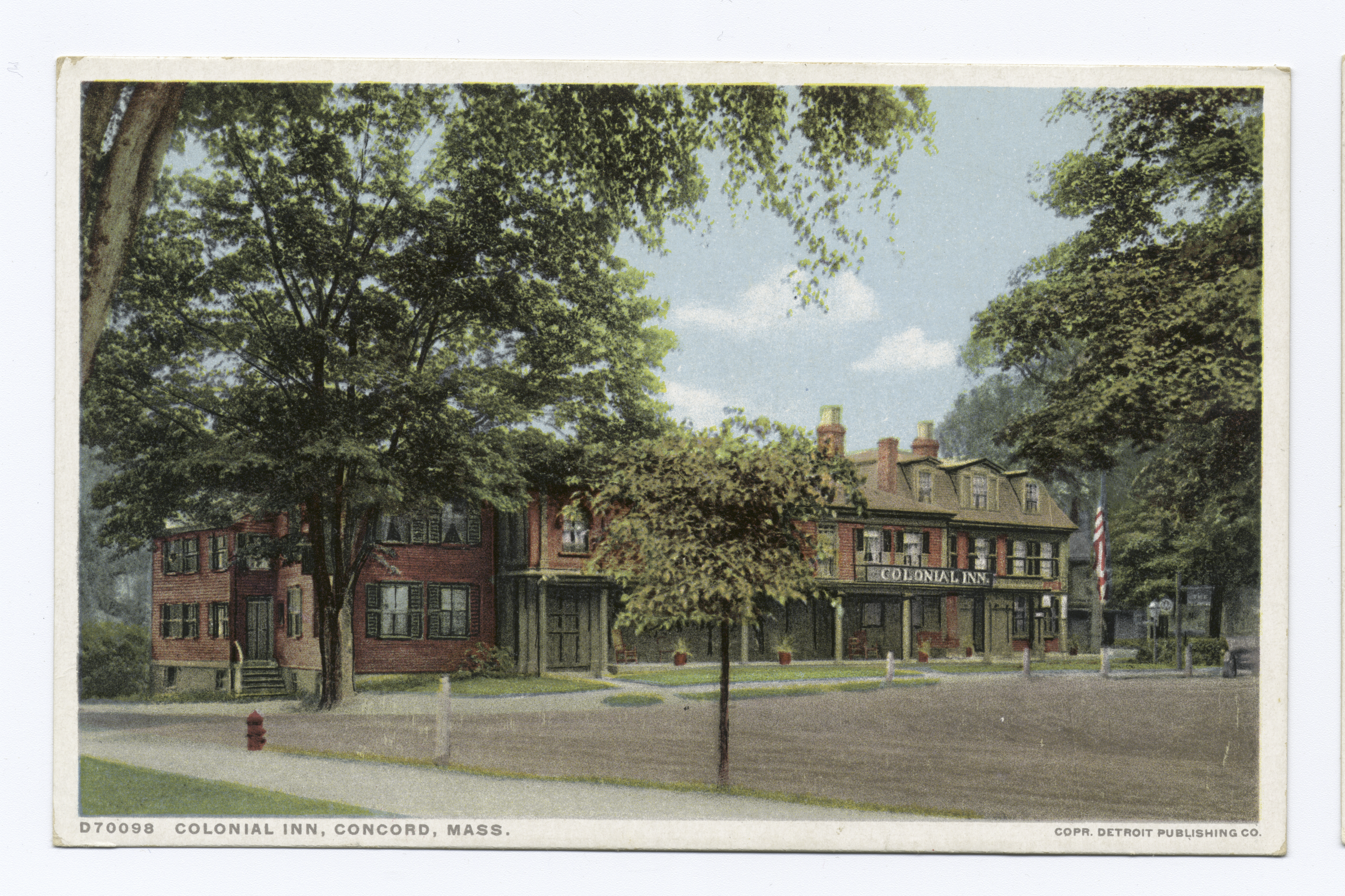
Sometime after 1898

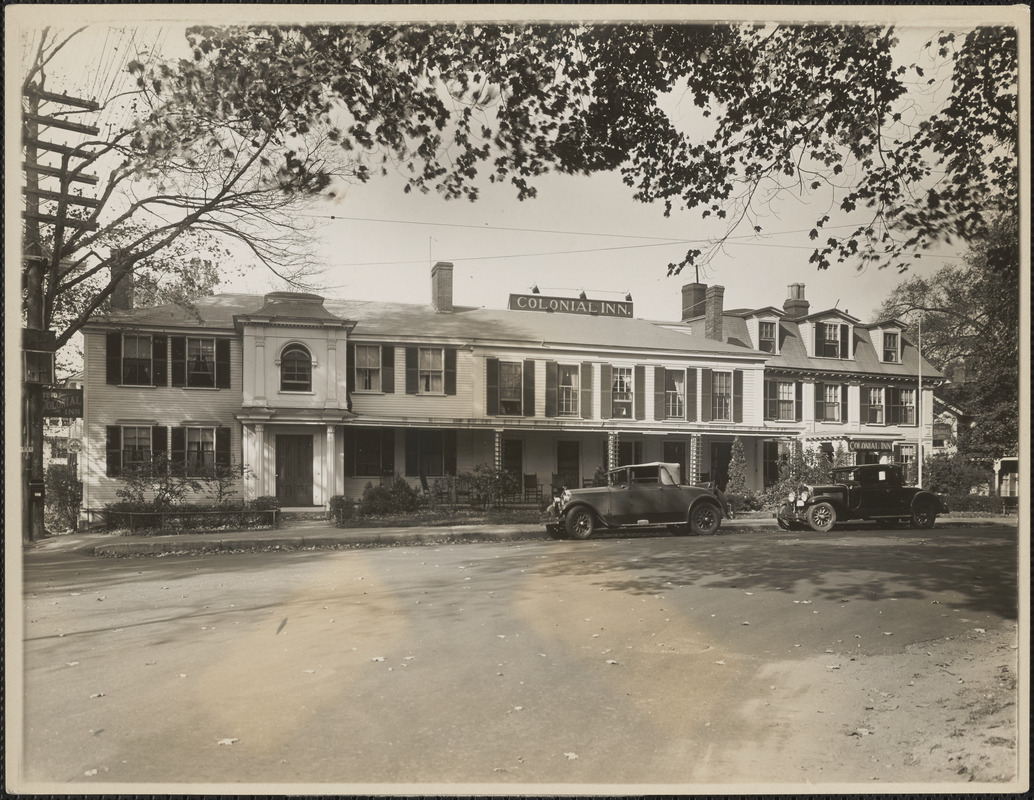
1929. The three separate original structures are marked by the chimney locations
