= Colonel Roger Brown House =

Historic house in Massachusetts, United States

- U.S. National Register of Historic Places
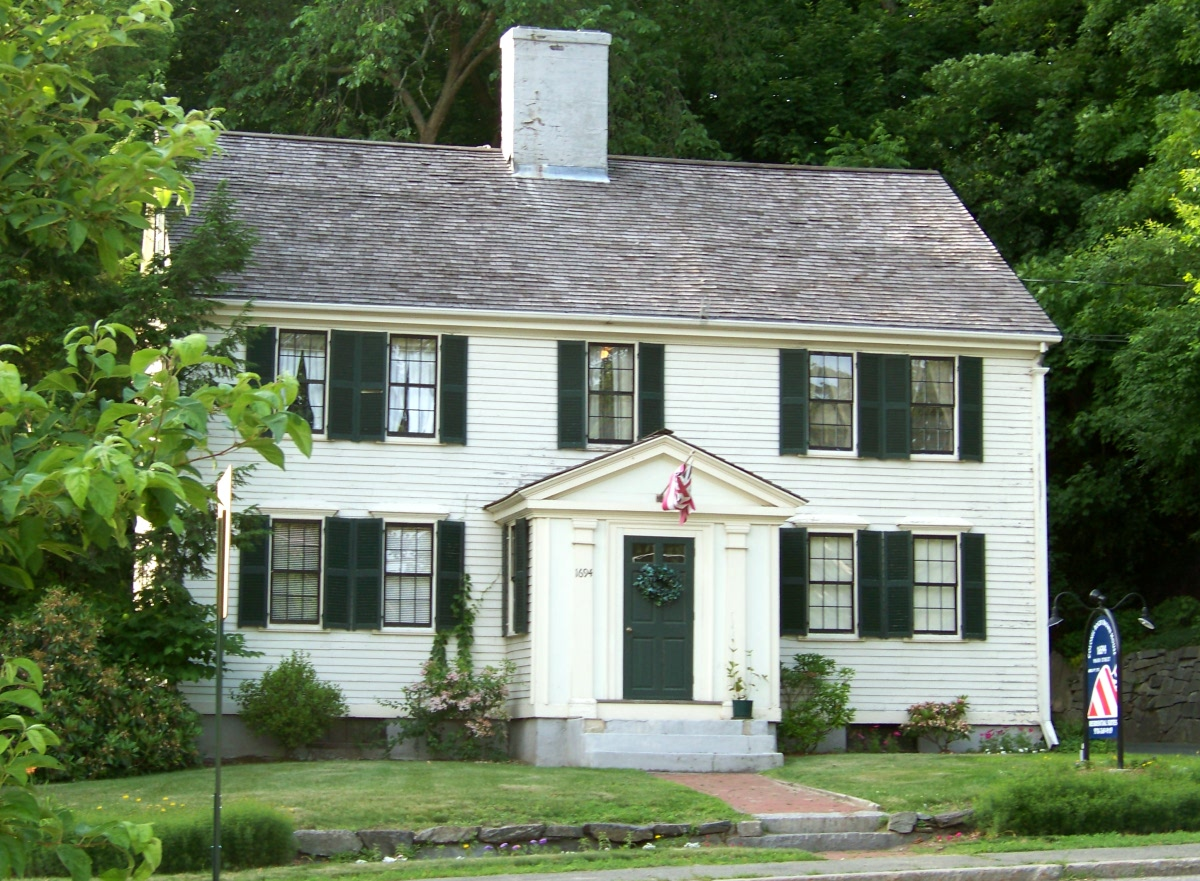

- Location within Massachusetts Location within the United States
- Location: 1694 Main Street, Concord, Massachusetts
- Coordinates: 42°27′11″N 71°24′33″W
- Built: 1775
- Architectural style: Colonial
- NRHP reference No.: 83000785
- Added to NRHP: January 27, 1983

The Colonel Roger Brown House is an historic house located at 1694 Main Street in Concord, Massachusetts.

== Description and history ==
It is a 2½-story, timber-frame structure, five bays wide, with a side gable roof, large central chimney, central main entrance and clapboard siding. The oldest portion of the house dates to about 1708, with a significant enlargement in 1775 by Roger Brown. During its construction, Brown was called to serve in the Battles of Lexington and Concord. The house was renovated in 1889 and added to the National Register of Historic Places in 1983.

== See also ==
- National Register of Historic Places listings in Concord, Massachusetts
