= Isaac Davis Trail =

- U.S. National Register of Historic Places
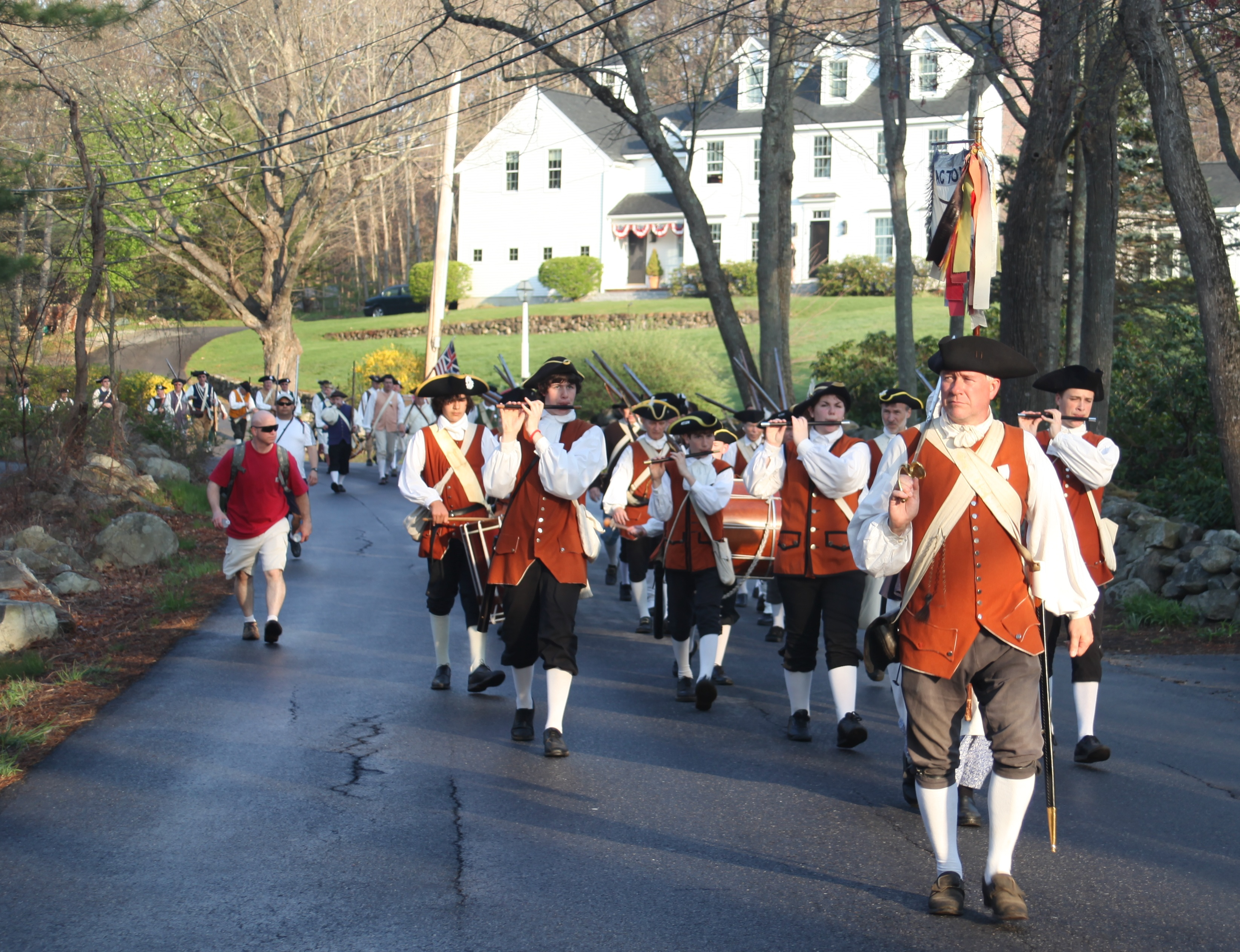
- Acton Minutemen and citizens marching to Concord, 16 April 2012

- Location within Massachusetts Location within the United States
- Location: Concord, Massachusetts & Acton, Massachusetts
- Coordinates: 42°28′48″N 71°23′57″W
- Built: 1775
- Architect: Isaac Davis & Minutemen
- NRHP reference No.: 72001347
- Added to NRHP: April 11, 1972

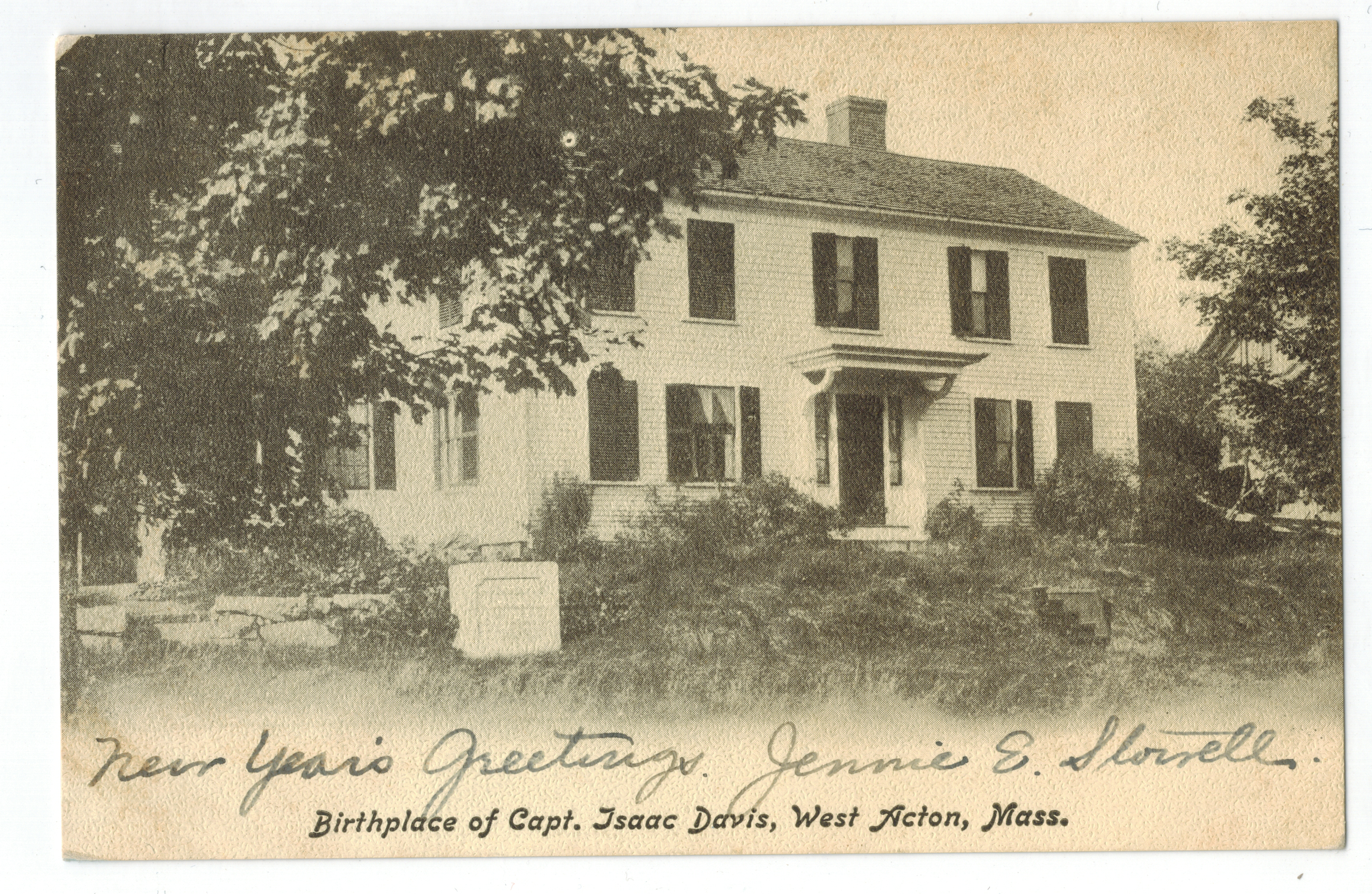
Isaac Davis' birth house in Acton, Massachusetts in 1905 (left) and 2015 (right)

The Isaac Davis Trail, also known as the Acton Trail, is an historic 6-mile (9.7 km) trail running east–west in the towns of Acton and Concord, Massachusetts. The trail was significant in 1775 when it was used by Captain Isaac Davis and the Acton Minutemen to march on Concord during the battles of Lexington and Concord. The trail was added to the National Register of Historic Places in 1972.

The trail begins at Isaac Davis' house in Acton, and ends at western end of the North Bridge in the Minuteman National Historical Park in Concord. Most of the route is now paved roads, where in some cases the alignment no longer matches the exact route. Despite this, the trail route evokes the time of the march, with its roadways lined with stone walls, and houses generally set back from the street. The trail first runs northeast about 1.25 miles (2.01 km) northeast, along Hayward Rd, Musket Dr, Minuteman Rd, Woodbury Ln, and Main St. It then turns more directly east for 1.5 miles (2.4 km), along a town-owned easement on private property, to Strawberry Hill Rd. It follows Strawberry Hill Rd southerly for 1.75 miles (2.82 km) to Barrett's Mill Rd, which runs easterly 0.75 miles (1.21 km) to meet Lowell Rd in Concord. It crosses Lowell Rd, following Barnes Hill Rd and crossing Liberty Rd to reach the Muster Field above the North Bridge.

== Events ==
The Isaac Davis Trailmarch is held each year on Patriots' Day.

== See also ==
- National Register of Historic Places listings in Concord, Massachusetts
