= Roger Brown (colonel) =

American carpenter and soldier

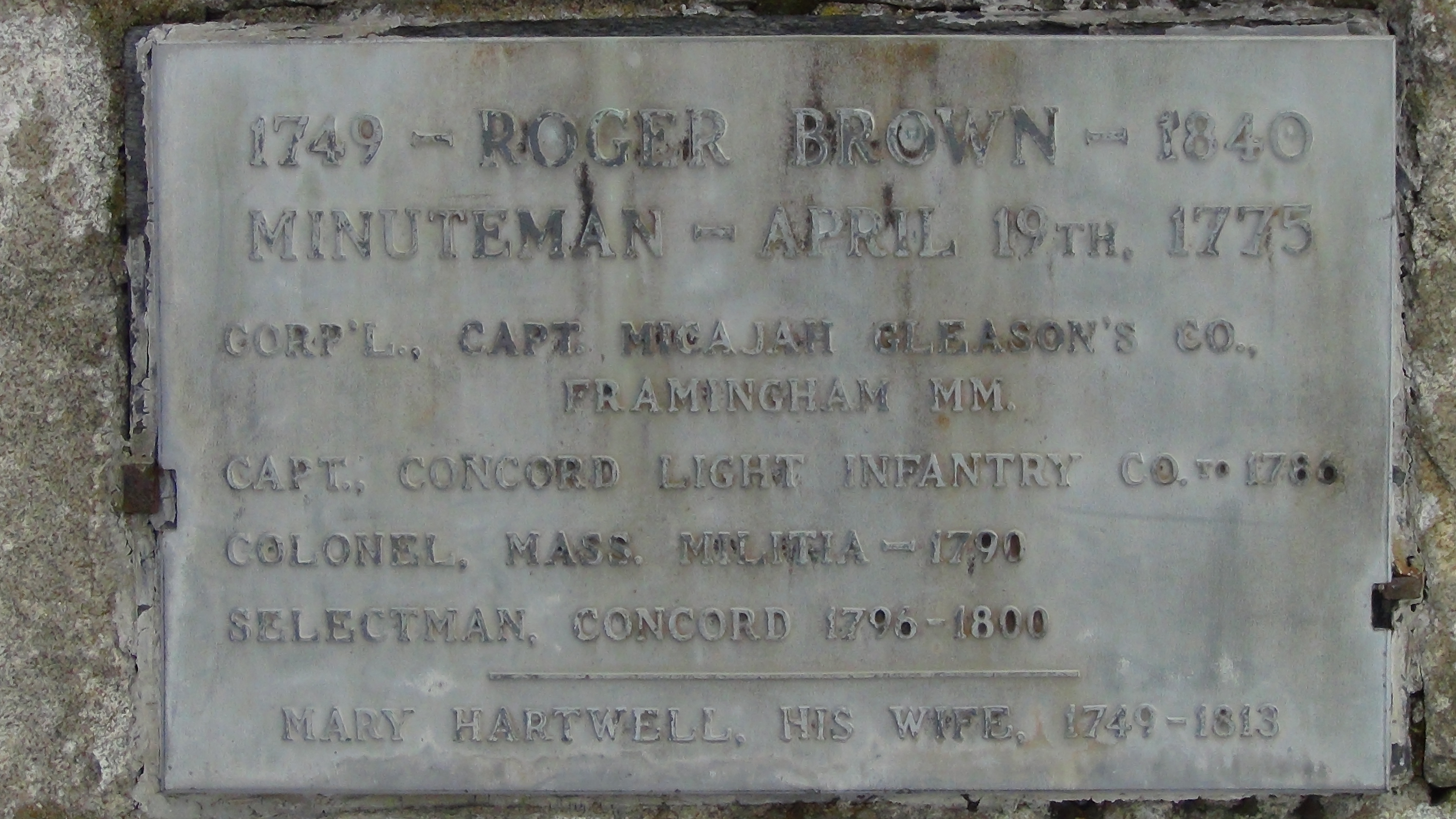
Roger Brown memorial in Monument Square, Concord MA

Roger Brown (1749 – March 6, 1840) was an American carpenter and soldier in the American Revolutionary War.

== Biography ==
Roger Brown was the son of William and Elizabeth Conant Brown, born in Framingham, Massachusetts. Deacon William Brown was a miller, who operated both a gristmill and a fulling mill on Cochituate Brook in the northern part of the town. In October 1750, a year after Roger was born, William placed an advertisement in the Boston Gazette seeking the return of his enslaved worker, "a Molatto fellow, about 27 years of age, named Crispas." Historians agree that this man was Crispus Attucks, who was the first man killed in the Boston Massacre twenty years later.

By some accounts, in the spring of 1775, Roger Brown, then 26, began building a house for himself on land in Concord, Massachusetts that belonged to his mother's family, the Conants. Other accounts say the house already existed decades before and he was extending it. In either case, local lore, supported by evidence found during the 1889 first renovation, tells of Brown working on the framing of the house when a call to arms came early on the morning of April 19, 1775 for the Concord skirmish of the Battles of Lexington and Concord.

Brown and his carpenters traded hatchets and saws for muskets and walked to Old North Bridge. He served as corporal under Captain Gleason of the Framingham Minuteman Company. In 1776, he joined Captain Hubbard's Concord Infantry as a sergeant indicating that he had settled into his Concord home. Over the next few years, Brown greatly increased his land holdings and prospered in the local farming and business communities. In 1779 he married Mary Hartwell from Lincoln and in 1783 their son, John, was born. He returned to military duty in 1786 as captain of a company charged with the duty of suppressing "Shays' Rebellion" that followed the revolution and was discharged from his successful campaign as colonel. He was a prominent citizen of Concord, elected as Selectman in 1796 while continuing to farm. Mary died in 1813, when they were both age 64.

At age 66, on February 5, 1815, Brown married Hepzibah Jones, who was the daughter of Ephraim Jones and Alice Cutler.

Brown died in 1840 at the age of 91 and is buried in the Hill Burial Ground in Concord center. The inscription on his memorial plaque reads:

1749 - Roger Brown - 1840
Minuteman - April 19th, 1775
Corp'l, Capt Micajah Gleason's Co.,
Framingham MM
Capt., Concord Light Infantry Co. to 1786
Colonel, Mass. Militia - 1790
Selectman, Concord 1796 -1800
Mary Hartwell, his wife, 1749 - 1813

== See also ==
- Colonel Roger Brown House
