= Wheeler-Harrington House =

Historic house in Massachusetts, United States

- U.S. National Register of Historic Places
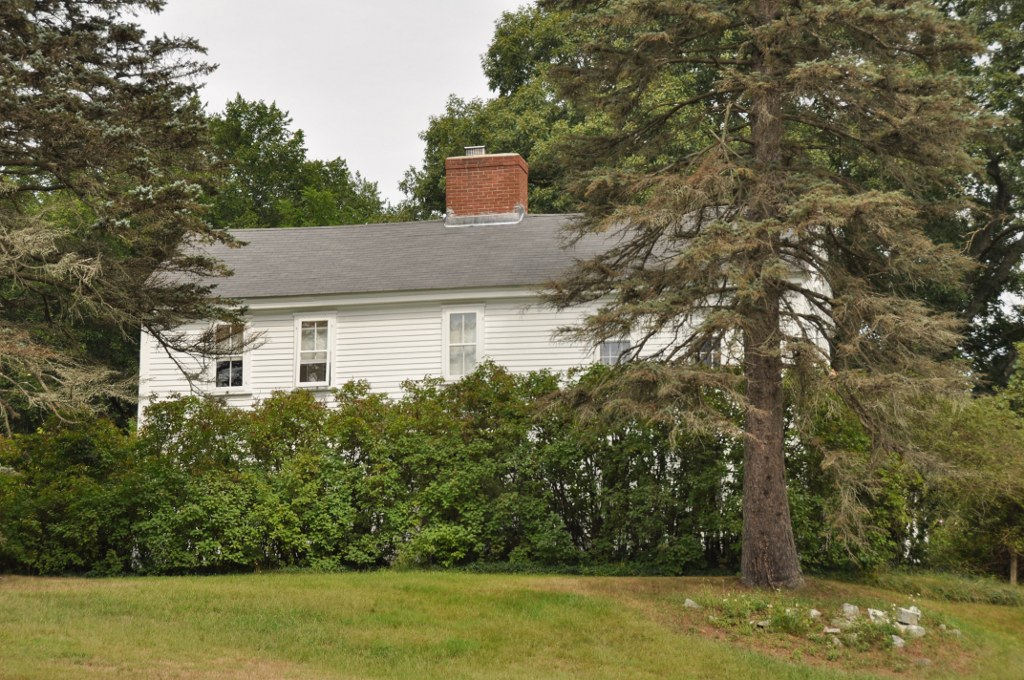

- Location within Massachusetts Location within the United States
- Location: 249 Harrington Avenue, Concord, Massachusetts
- Coordinates: 42°26′57″N 71°24′12″W
- Built: c. 1742
- Architect: Josiah Wheeler
- Architectural style: Colonial, Georgian
- NRHP reference No.: 13000534
- Added to NRHP: July 23, 2013

The Wheeler-Harrington House is a historic house located at 249 Harrington Avenue in Concord, Massachusetts.

== Description and history ==
The 2 1/2-story timber-frame house was probably built around 1742, around the time of the marriage of Josiah and Mary Wheeler. It is the oldest known building in West Concord. It remained in Wheeler family hands until 1827, when it, along with 100 acres (40 ha) of farmland, was sold to Joseph Harrington, Jr., of Lexington. For thirty years (1877 to 1907) the farm was operated and maintained by his daughter, Lucy Harrington. In the 20th century, the farmstead was for fifty years in the hands of a single family, the LeBallisters, who operated a horse farm on land that had been reduced by subdivision. In 1974, the town acquired the house and 15 acres (6.1 ha) of farmland, extending from Harrington Road to the Assabet River. The house was restored by volunteers, and has since been rented by the town to tenant farmers.

The house was listed on the National Register of Historic Places on July 23, 2013.

== See also ==
- National Register of Historic Places listings in Concord, Massachusetts
- National Register of Historic Places listings in Middlesex County, Massachusetts
