= Hubbard-French District =

Historic district in Massachusetts, United States

- U.S. National Register of Historic Places
- U.S. Historic district
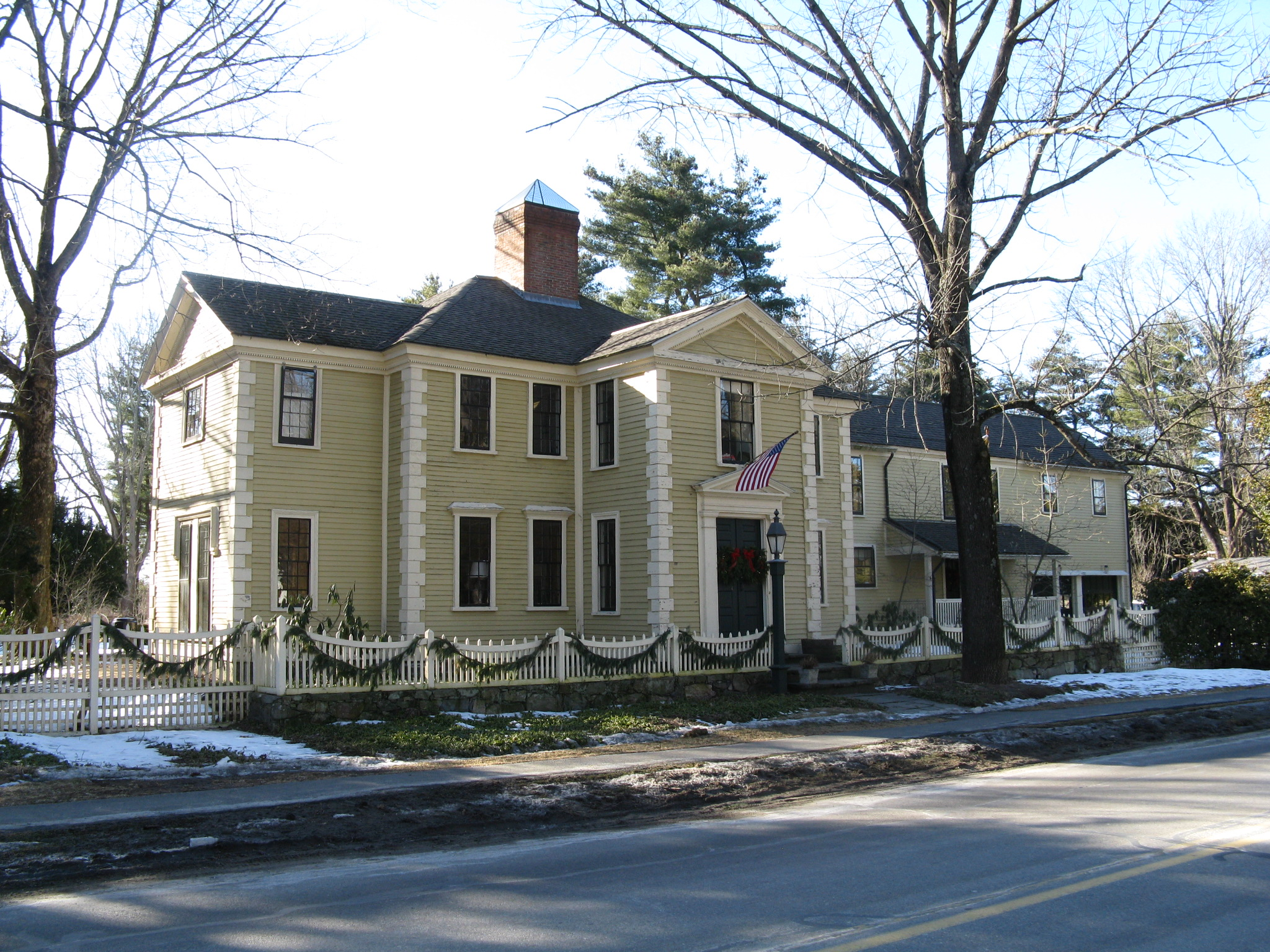
- Thomas Hubbard House

- Location within Massachusetts Location within the United States
- Location: Concord, Massachusetts
- Coordinates: 42°27′5″N 71°21′35″W
- Area: 3.4 acres (1.4 ha)
- Built: 1787
- Architect: French, Daniel Chester
- Architectural style: Georgian, Queen Anne
- NRHP reference No.: 00000686
- Added to NRHP: June 15, 2000

The Hubbard-French District is a historic district at 324 and 342 Sudbury Road in Concord, Massachusetts. It consists of three parcels of land that are the center of the Hubbard family farm. It includes two houses: the 1787-88 Georgian style Thomas Hubbard House, and the Queen Anne style artist's studio of renowned sculptor Daniel Chester French, whose parents owned the Hubbard house. French, who had the house built to his specifications as a studio space, used it for that purpose until 1888, when he moved to New York City. The Hubbard was later owned by historian Samuel Eliot Morison.

The district was listed on the National Register of Historic Places in 2000.

== See also ==
- National Register of Historic Places listings in Concord, Massachusetts
