= Dr. John Cuming House =

Historic house in Massachusetts, United States

- U.S. National Register of Historic Places
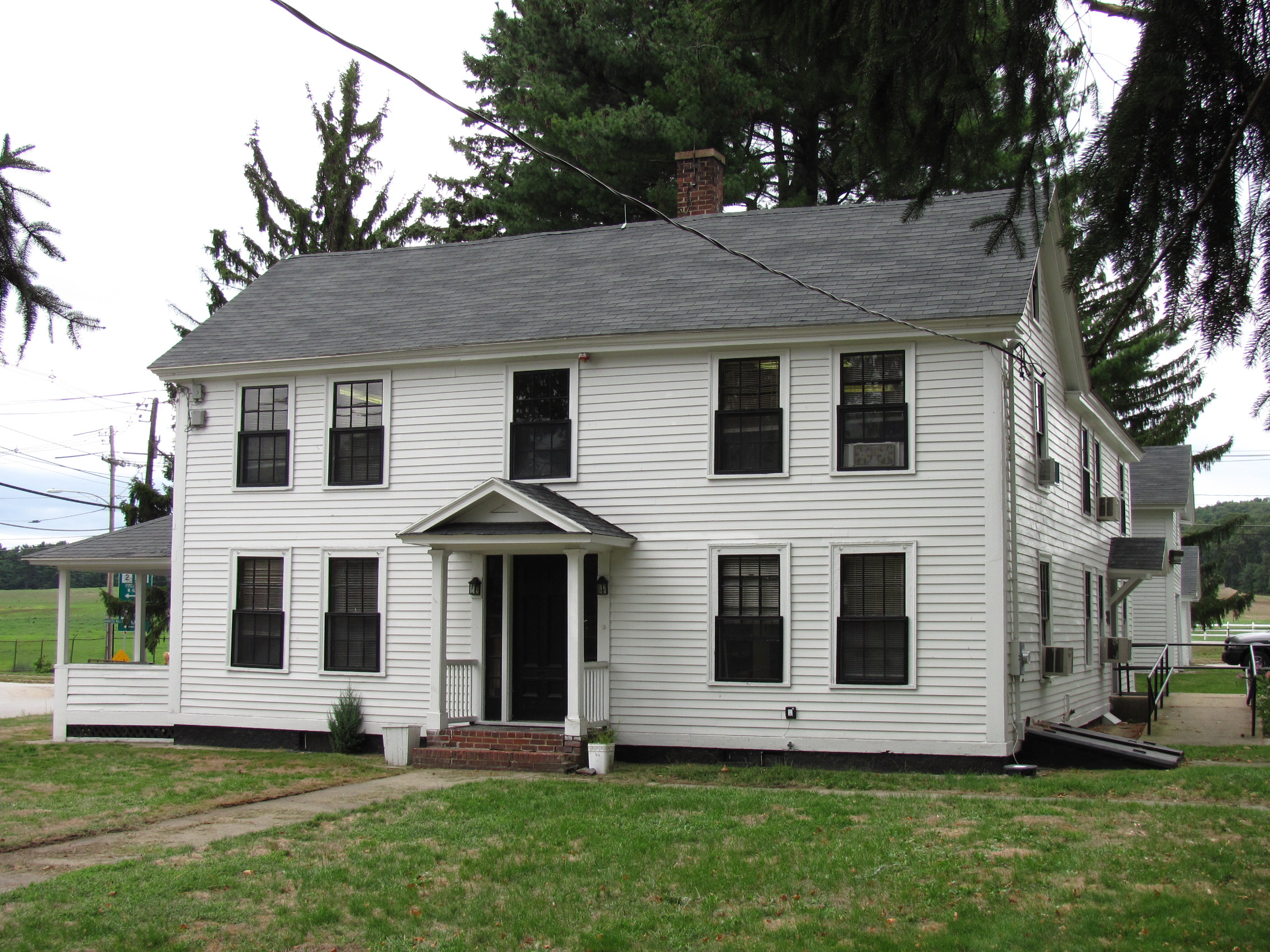

- Location within Massachusetts Location within the United States
- Location: 998 Elm Street, west of Concord, Massachusetts
- Coordinates: 42°28′2.5″N 71°23′46.6″W
- Built: 1754
- NRHP reference No.: 77000175
- Added to NRHP: November 11, 1977

The Dr. John Cuming House is a historic house located west of Concord, Massachusetts, at 998 Elm Street, at Barretts Mill Road and Reformatory Circle.

== Description and history ==
The 2 1/2-story timber-framed house was built around 1754 by John Cuming, a prominent local doctor. In addition to his role as a leading physician in the town, Cuming presided over Concord's town meetings in the turbulent years of the American Revolution, and served as a delegate to the 1779 convention that drafted the Massachusetts State Constitution. He enslaved two men at his home, Brister Freeman and a man known only as "Jem." He left a bequest to Harvard College to be used for the establishment of its medical school. His house later served as the residence of the deputy superintendent of Concord State Prison, and is now owned by the state.

The house was listed on the National Register of Historic Places on November 11, 1977.

== See also ==
- National Register of Historic Places listings in Concord, Massachusetts
