= Monument Square (Concord, Massachusetts) =

Square in Concord, Massachusetts

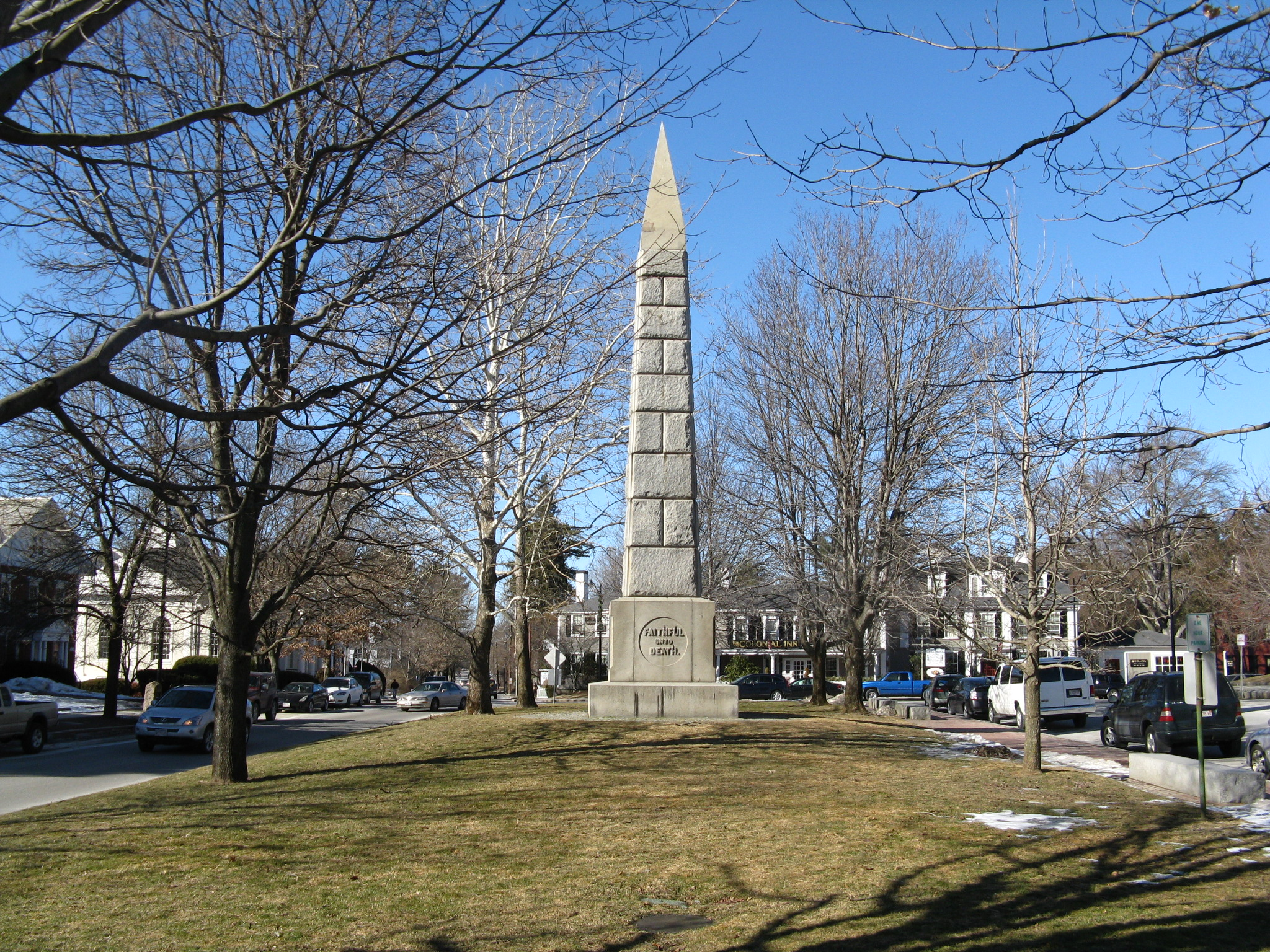
- The square in 2010, looking northwest
- Maintained by: Town of Concord
- Location: Concord, Massachusetts, U.S.
- Coordinates: 42.4610531°N 71.349258°W
- North: Monument Street

Monument Square is a formerly open area in the center of Concord, Massachusetts, United States. Laid out in 1635, it is now part of the Concord Monument Square–Lexington Road Historic District.

The square is prominently known as the site of British activities on April 19, 1775, the day of the battles of Lexington and Concord, which began the American Revolutionary War, and of earlier meetings by Massachusetts Patriots, which were held in the First Parish Church and Wright's Tavern.

A stone marker commemorating Corporal Ralph P. Hosmer, Private Charles A. Hart, and Private George E. Adams, of Concord's company in the 6th Massachusetts Voluntary Infantry Regiment, stands at the northwestern edge of the square. The trio fought for the United States in the Spanish–American War.

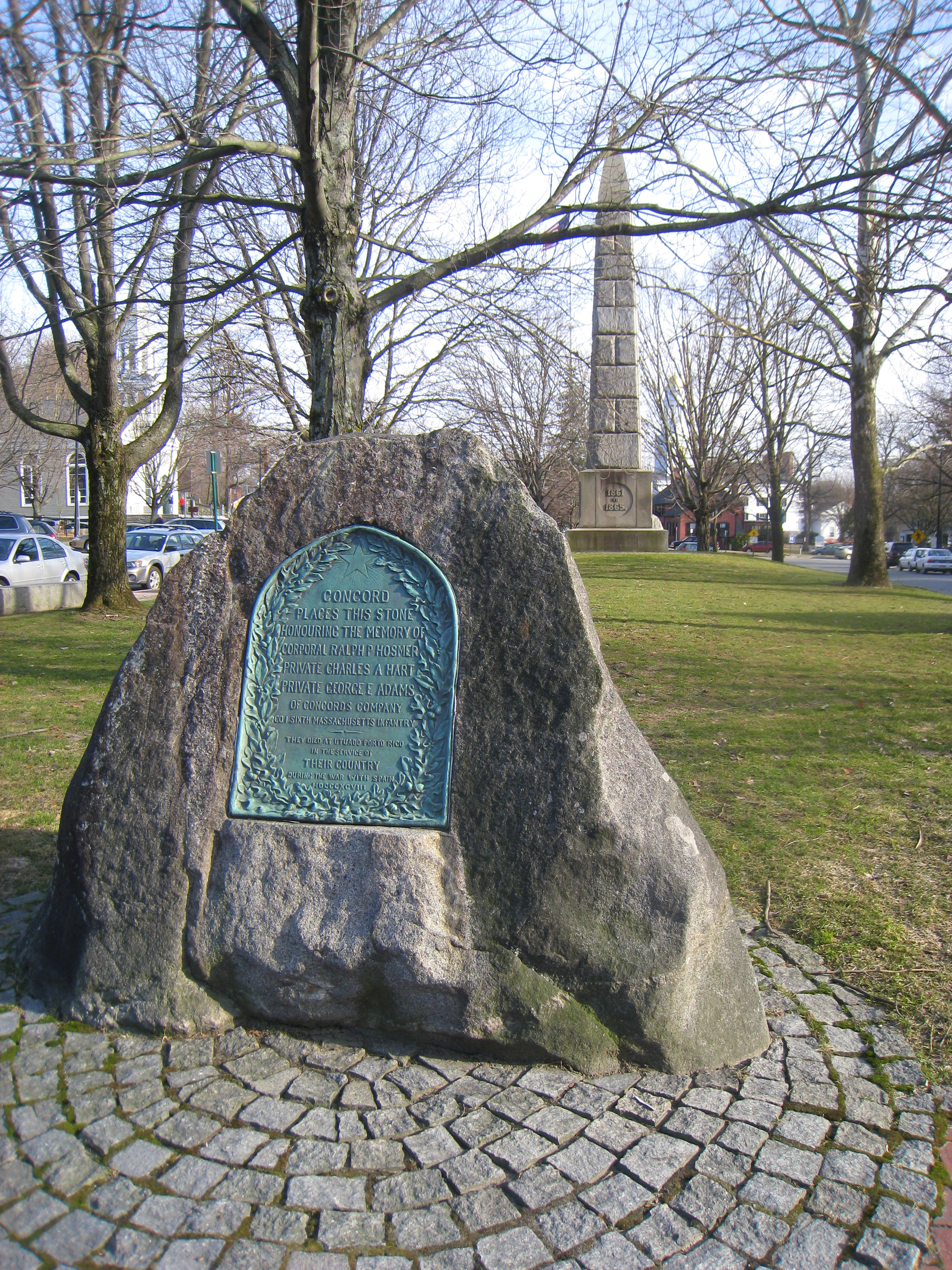
Spanish War monument
