= Wheeler-Merriam House =

Historic house in Massachusetts, United States

- U.S. National Register of Historic Places
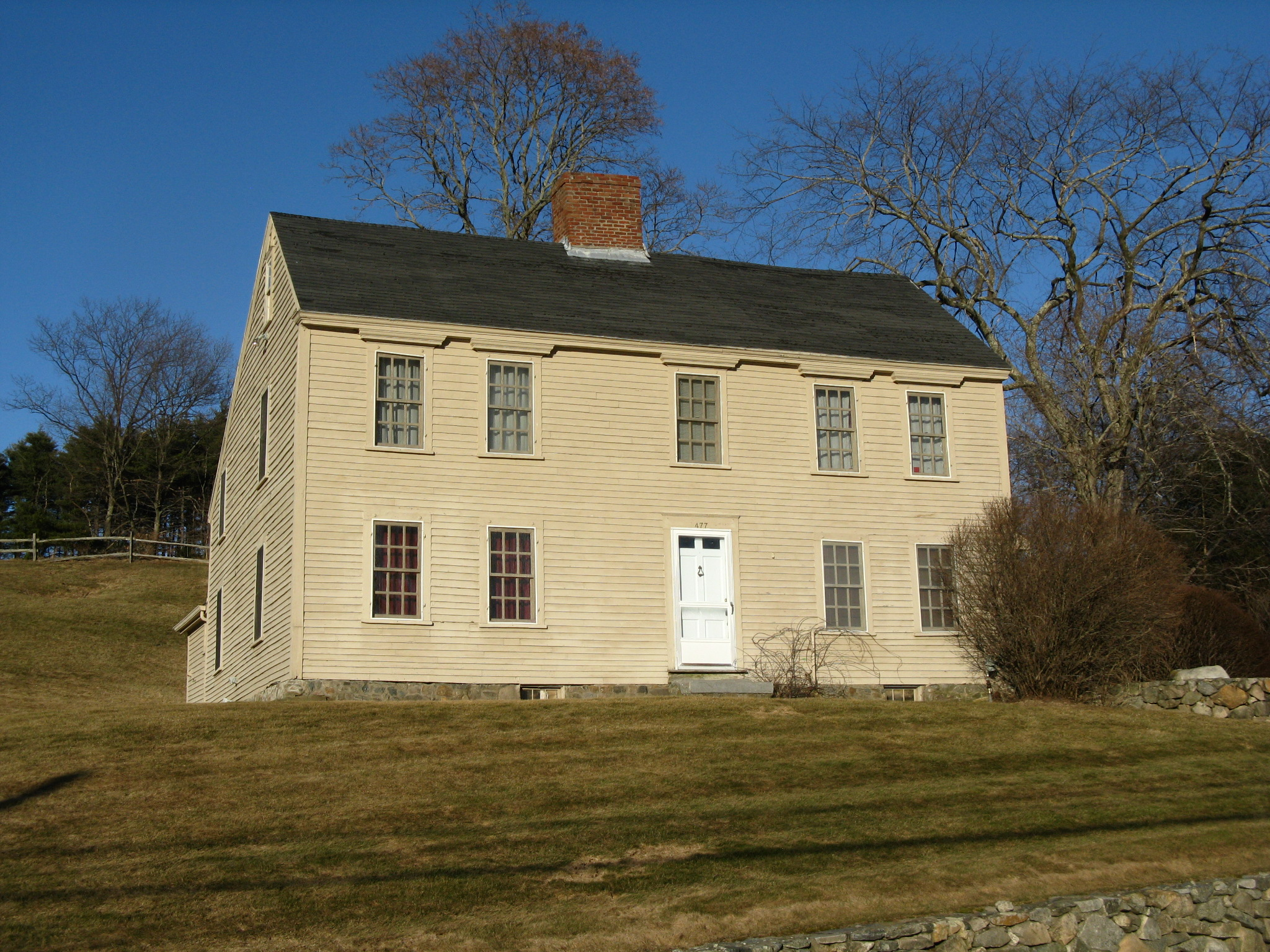

- Location within Massachusetts Location within the United States
- Location: 477 Virginia Road, Concord, Massachusetts
- Coordinates: 42°28′6″N 71°18′28″W
- Area: 35 acres (14 ha)
- Built: 1692
- Architectural style: Colonial
- NRHP reference No.: 82000493
- Added to NRHP: November 26, 1982

The Wheeler-Merriam House (also known as the Elm Brook Farm) is a historic house located at 477 Virginia Road in Concord, Massachusetts. With a construction history dating to about 1692, it is one of Concord's oldest buildings. It is also notable for having joinery by Abner Wheeler, a prominent local builder of the late 18th century, and for its long association with the locally prominent Wheeler and Merriam families. It was added to the National Register of Historic Places on November 26, 1982.

== Description and history ==
The Wheeler-Merriam House stands in a rural residential-commercial area of eastern Concord. Property historically associated with the house is located on both sides of Virginia Road, east of its crossing of Elm Brook. The house stands north of the road, on about 18 acres (7.3 ha) of land, while a barn stands on 17 acres (6.9 ha) south of the road. The barn property has since been sold, and now houses the production offices of This Old House.

The house is a wood-frame structure, 2 1/2 stories in height, with a side gable roof and a central brick chimney. Its rear roof extends to the first floor, giving the house a classic saltbox profile. The front facade is five bays wide, with a slightly asymmetrical organization: the center bay is skewed slightly to the right. The interior is organized in a traditional center-chimney plan, with chambers on either side of the chimney, and a long third chamber behind it. A narrow winding stair rises to the second floor in the entrance vestibule. The building's principal timber framing beams have been enclosed in finished wood.

The property was allocated to Thomas Wheeler in the mid-17th century, and this house was probably built by him in 1692 as a wedding present for his son Timothy. Both Wheelers were prominent in local affairs and were among the town's wealthier residents. Abner Wheeler, the fourth generation of Wheelers on the land, is credited with doing the woodwork finishes in the left parlor and upstairs chamber above. Wheeler was an important local builder, who was one of the leaders of the reconstruction of the town's meetinghouse in 1791. The property remained in agricultural use into the 1980s.

== See also ==
- National Register of Historic Places listings in Concord, Massachusetts
- List of the oldest buildings in Massachusetts
