= Thomas Mott Shaw Estate =

Historic house in Massachusetts, United States

- U.S. National Register of Historic Places
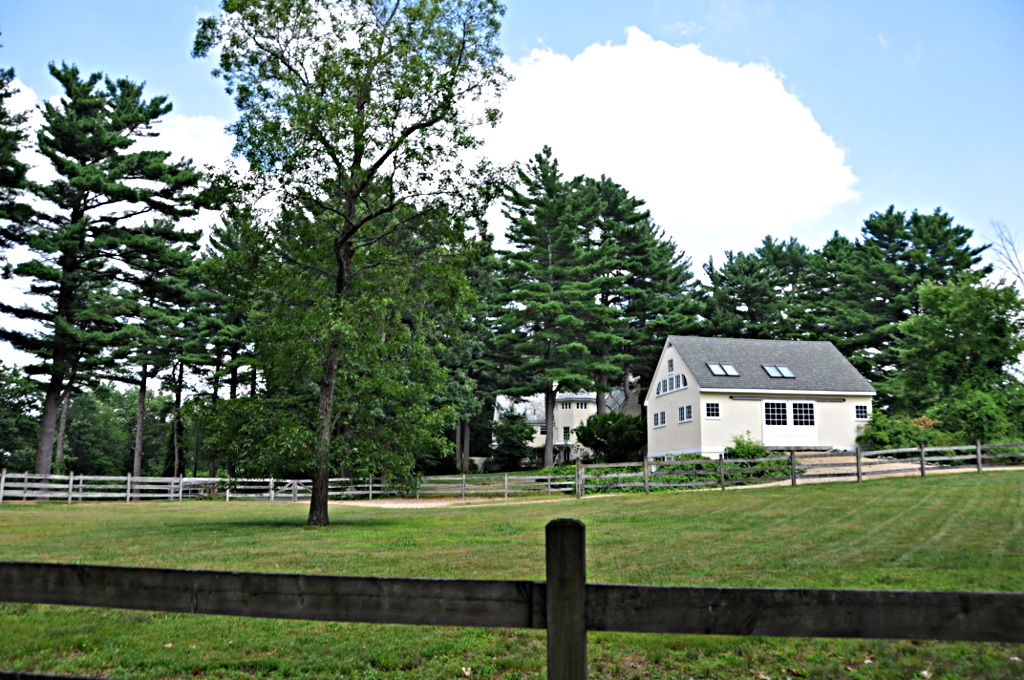

- Location within Massachusetts Location within the United States
- Location: 317 Garfield Road, Concord, Massachusetts
- Coordinates: 42°25′42″N 71°21′49″W
- Built: 1909–10
- Architect: T. Mott Shaw
- Architectural style: Tudor Revival
- NRHP reference No.: 87001395
- Added to NRHP: November 20, 1987

The Thomas Mott Shaw Estate is a historic residential estate located at 317 Garfield Road in Concord, Massachusetts.

== Description and history ==
The existing main house is the survivor of a pair of houses built in 1909–10 by architect Thomas Mott Shaw on property owned by his father, architect George R. Shaw. The surviving house was designed as the home of the elder Shaw and his wife, Emily (Mott) Shaw. The other house, designed by the younger Shaw for himself, his wife Caroline (Quinan) Shaw and their children, was destroyed by fire in 1931.

After the fire George R. Shaw moved in with his daughter, Isabel P. (Shaw) Lowell and her husband, Frederick E. Lowell, in their neighboring home. T. Mott Shaw and his family then moved into his father's former home. Shaw lived in the house until his death in 1965.

The house is a 2 1/2-story L-shaped stucco-clad structure, basically vernacular English Revival in its styling, with some arts and crafts detailing. The house, along with the accompanying carriage house were designed by Shaw, who made the estate his home for most of his professional life. Shaw drew inspiration for the house from the architecture of the Cotswolds in England. The house's most prominent feature is a three-story octagonal tower that projects from the center of the L.

The estate was listed on the National Register of Historic Places on November 20, 1987.

== See also ==
- National Register of Historic Places listings in Concord, Massachusetts
