= Damon Mill =

- U.S. National Register of Historic Places
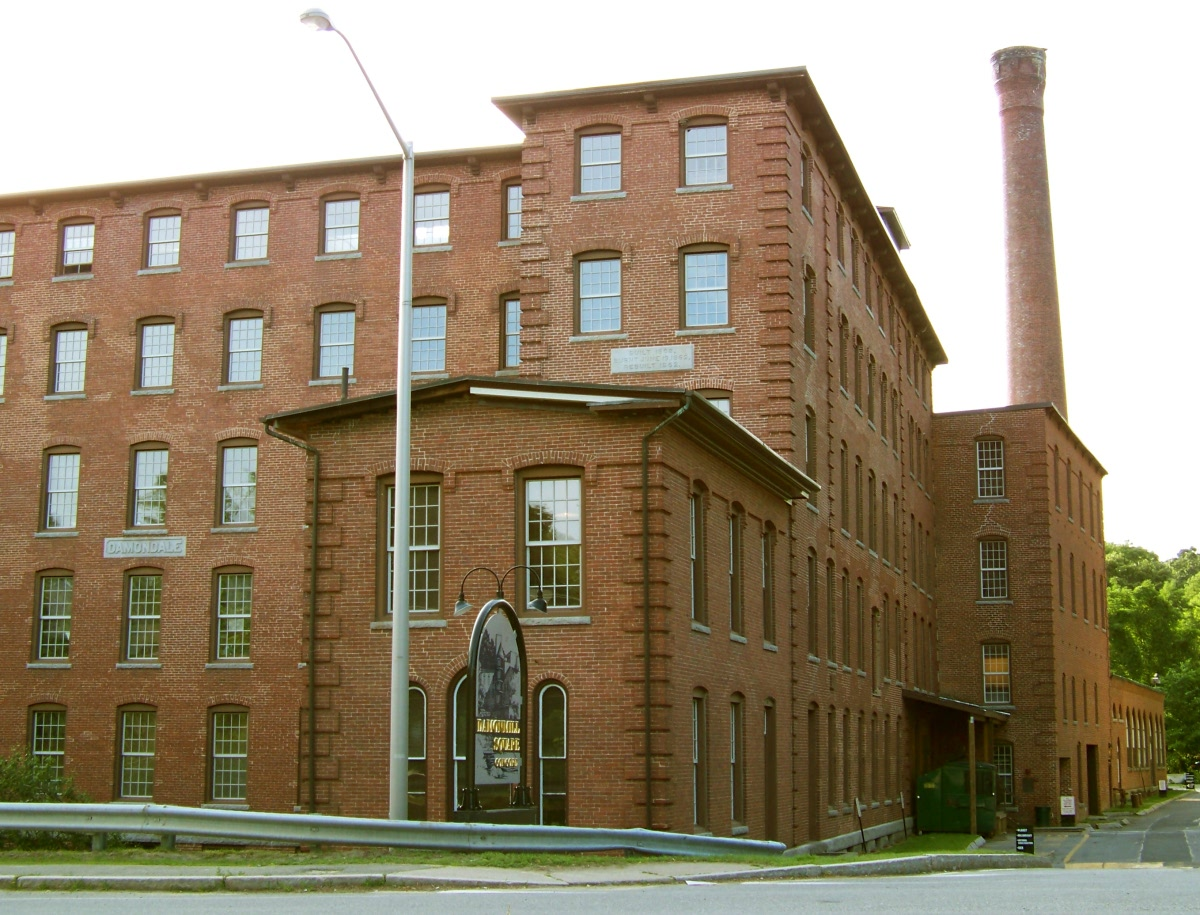
- Street View of the Damon Mill

- Location within Massachusetts Location within the United States
- Location: Pond Lane, Concord, Massachusetts
- Coordinates: 42°27′12″N 71°24′35″W
- Area: 4.5 acres (1.8 ha)
- Built: 1862
- Architect: Elbridge Boyden
- Architectural style: Italianate
- NRHP reference No.: 79000360
- Added to NRHP: May 25, 1979

The Damon Mill is an historic mill complex on the Assabet River and located at 9 Pond Lane in Concord, Massachusetts. The site, which has an industrial history dating to the 17th century, was adapted for the production of textiles in the 19th century, with the surviving complex dating to 1862. It was listed on the National Register of Historic Places in 1979.

== History ==
Industrial works in the Assabet River area of western Concord date to about 1660, when there was a bog iron works established. The river was soon dammed, with grist and sawmills serving the surrounding agricultural community. The first textile mill was built in 1808 by John Brown, the son of a local clothier, and produced cotton goods. The mill changed hands several times before coming under the ownership of Calvin Carver Damon in 1834. Under his ownership, improvements were made to the dam and tail race, and a more efficient water wheel was installed. In 1854, Calvin's son, Edward Carver Damon, assumed control of the mill. Damon Mill produced a unique textile known as domett cloth, a light wool-cotton flannel invented by Calvin Damon, which became a mainstay fabric used in underwear. By the 1870s it was producing a diversified array of materials, and employed 175 workers.

On June 19, 1862, the wooden mill burnt to the ground. Edward Damon and architect Elbridge Boyden rebuilt the mill in the same year. The mill continued to produce textiles until the 1890s. It was mortgaged in 1893 and sold by 1898. In the early decades of the 20th century it was used by other textile firms for the production of worsteds, but its small size led to its eventual closure. From about 1930 to 1973 the plant was used for the cold storage of apples. Today, the mill has been rehabilitated, and is used as office space by various businesses.

== See also ==
- National Register of Historic Places listings in Concord, Massachusetts
