= Concord Monument Square–Lexington Road Historic District =

Historic district in Massachusetts, United States

- U.S. National Register of Historic Places
- U.S. Historic district
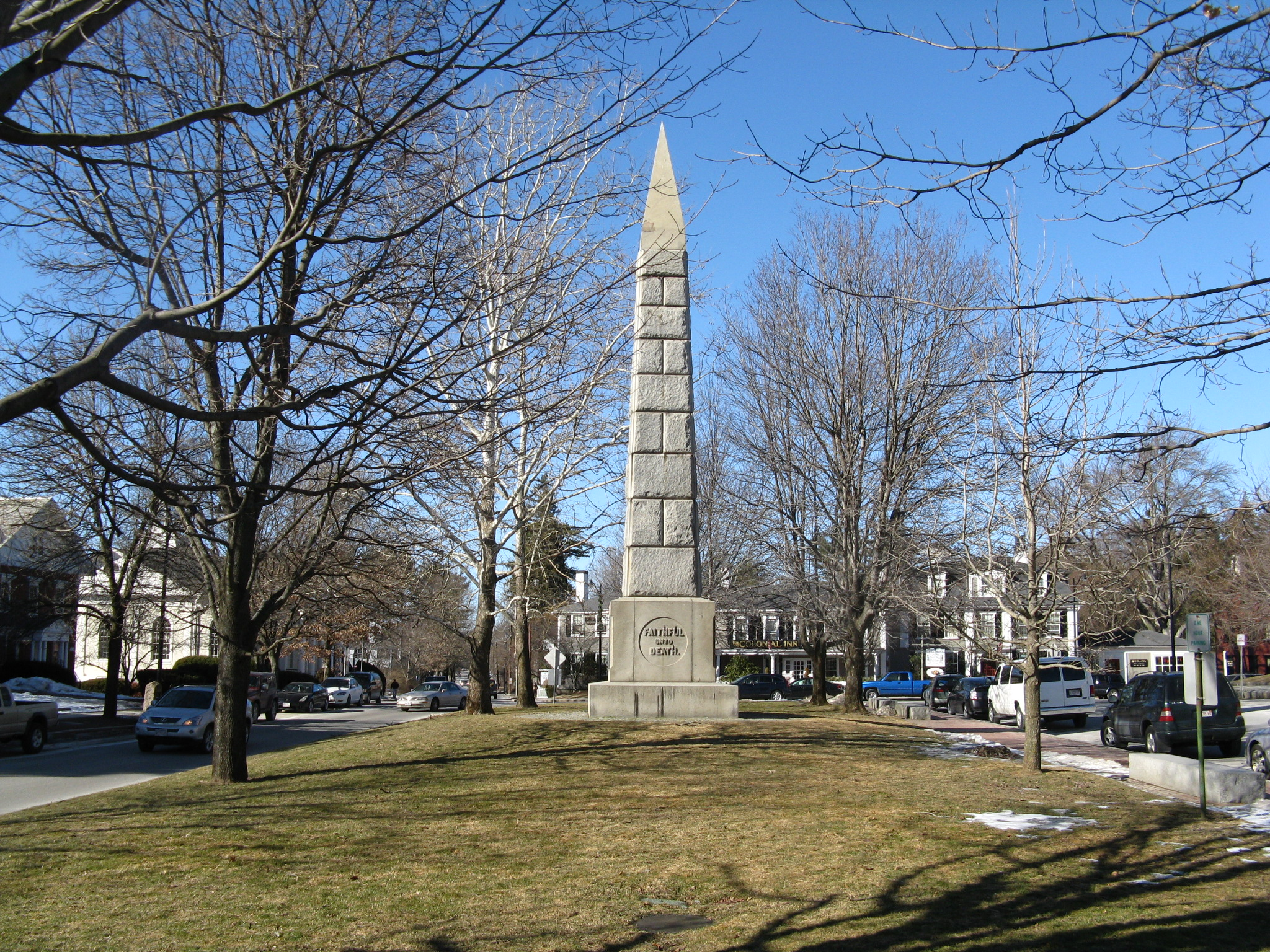
- Civil War Memorial in Monument Square

- Location within Massachusetts Location within the United States
- Location: Concord, Massachusetts
- Coordinates: 42°27′34″N 71°20′51″W
- Built: 1635
- Architect: Multiple
- Architectural style: Mid 19th Century Revival, Georgian, Federal
- NRHP reference No.: 77000172
- Added to NRHP: September 13, 1977

The Concord Monument Square–Lexington Road Historic District is an historic district in Concord, Massachusetts. Monument Square, at the center of the district, was laid out in 1635. The district includes a collection of well-preserved residential houses stretching along Lexington Street southeast from the square, and along Lowell northwest of the square. The square is prominently known as the site of British activities on April 19, 1775, the day of the Battles of Lexington and Concord which began the American Revolutionary War, and of earlier meetings by Massachusetts Patriots which were held in the First Parish Church and Wright's Tavern. The Tavern and the Ralph Waldo Emerson House, which stands near the eastern end of the district, are both National Historic Landmarks. The district was listed on the National Register of Historic Places in 1977.

== See also ==
- National Register of Historic Places listings in Concord, Massachusetts
