= Pest House (Concord, Massachusetts) =

Historic house in Massachusetts, United States

- U.S. National Register of Historic Places
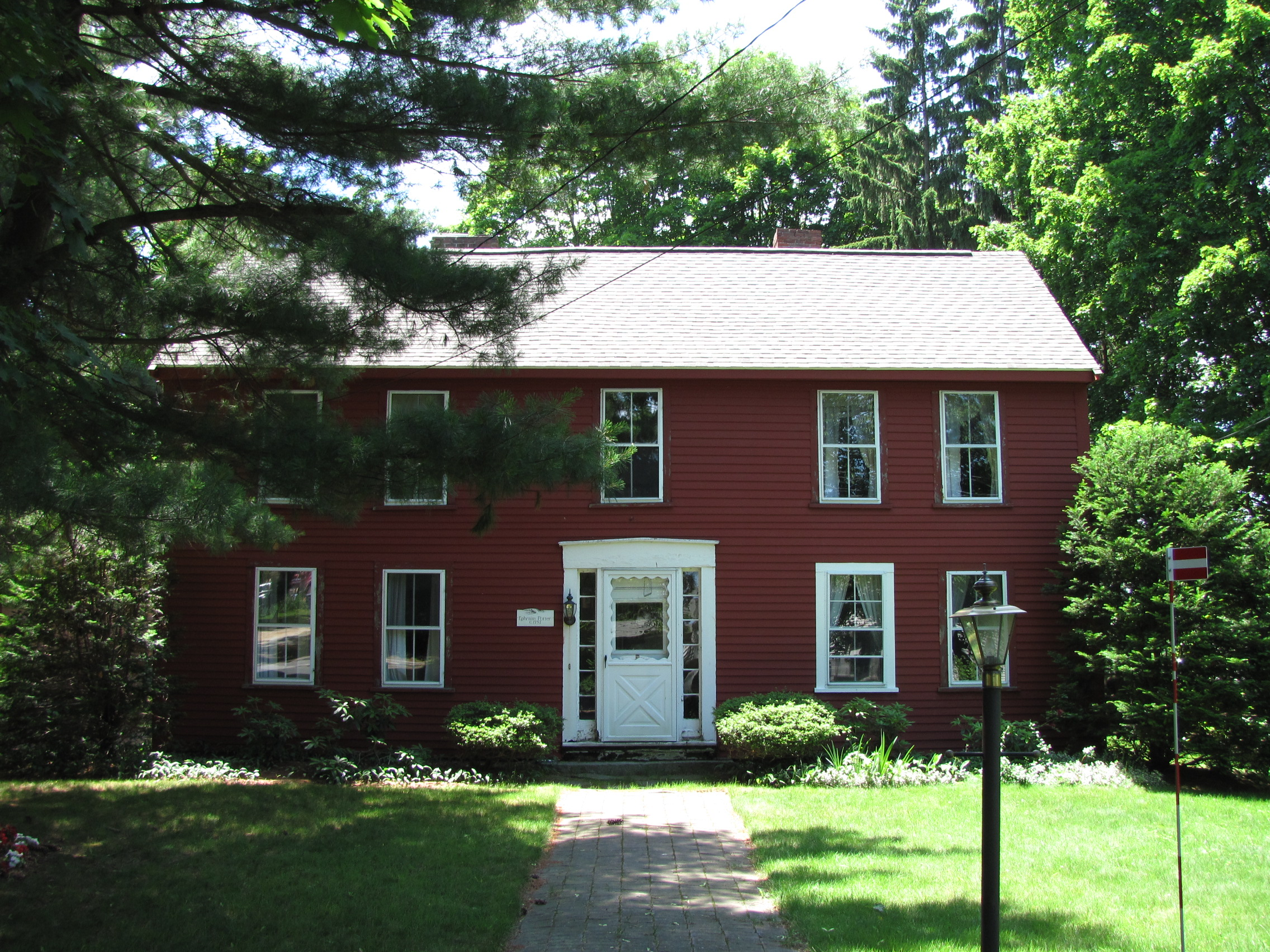

- Location within Massachusetts Location within the United States
- Location: 158 Fairhaven Road, Concord, Massachusetts
- Coordinates: 42.44647°N 71.35432°W
- Built: 1792
- NRHP reference No.: 77000174
- Added to NRHP: April 18, 1977

The Ephraim Potter House, a historic house and former pest house at 158 Fairhaven Road in Concord, Massachusetts, is also known as the Pest House, a name used in the 18th century to describe a building in which to quarantine those afflicted with communicable diseases such as tuberculosis, cholera, or smallpox.

The house was built before 1792 and added to the National Register of Historic Places in 1977, where it is listed at 153 Fairhaven Road. John Fitzgerald, the current owner of this old property, describes that it is his "dream is to keep it standing."

The booklet, "Old Houses of Concord", by Mary R. Fenn contains the following information on the Ephraim Potter House:

"Deacon Luke Potter, one of the first settlers, lived on the corner of Heywood Street and Lexington Road. His son Judah was the only one to perpetuate the family name before Judah's death in that house when it burned to the ground (June 20, 1721). Deacon Luke had acquired a large tract of land in the south quarter, in the vicinity of Fairhaven Road. At the time of the second division, houses were built on the property."

"In 1752, Ephaim Potter married Sarah Taylor, which probably dates this house. Ephraim was one of the men who stored provincial supplies in his house prior to the Revolution - tents, tow cloth, canteens, etc."

"At the time of the smallpox epidemic, vaccination was a newfangled idea; many people thought it was dangerous. When Ephraim's wife died of smallpox in 1792, it was thought to be important to engrave on her headstone that she had taken the disease in the natural way. She was buried in the small cemetery diagonally across from the house (across Route 2). Although hers is the only gravestone, it is thought that there are other graves there as well. The Potter House was used at this time as a hospital for those who were recovering from their vaccination treatment. Dr. Barrett was in the house one day when a traveler knocked on the door and asked if this were the hospital. "Yes," replied the doctor, "and I am one of the patients."

"Elbridge Hayden bought the house in the early eighteen hundreds".

== Historical Ownership of the House ==
Ownership records below with references were identified during a review of deeds at the Middlesex County Registry of Deeds.

Ephraim Potter, builder ca. 1752.

Darius Hubbard – sold the house to Elbridge Hayden for $1,000, “Potter Place” including “Potter Wood” 28 acres on July 18, 1846.

Elbridge Hayden sold the house to Laura J. Dwelley, July 31, 1894.

Laura J. Dwelley to George F. Wheeler, April 25, 1908.

Blanche E. Williams, Conservator of the Estate of George F. Wheeler to Leslie L. Keese, April 26, 1924.

Leslie L. Keese to Davis et el., December 19, 1941.

A.H. Elfner.

Robert Venuati, 1971

John MacDonald.

Ken Brown.

John and Maria Fitzgerald, April 1994 to Present (1.5 acres).

== See also ==
- National Register of Historic Places listings in Concord, Massachusetts
