= Joseph Hosmer House =

Historic house in Massachusetts, United States

- U.S. National Register of Historic Places
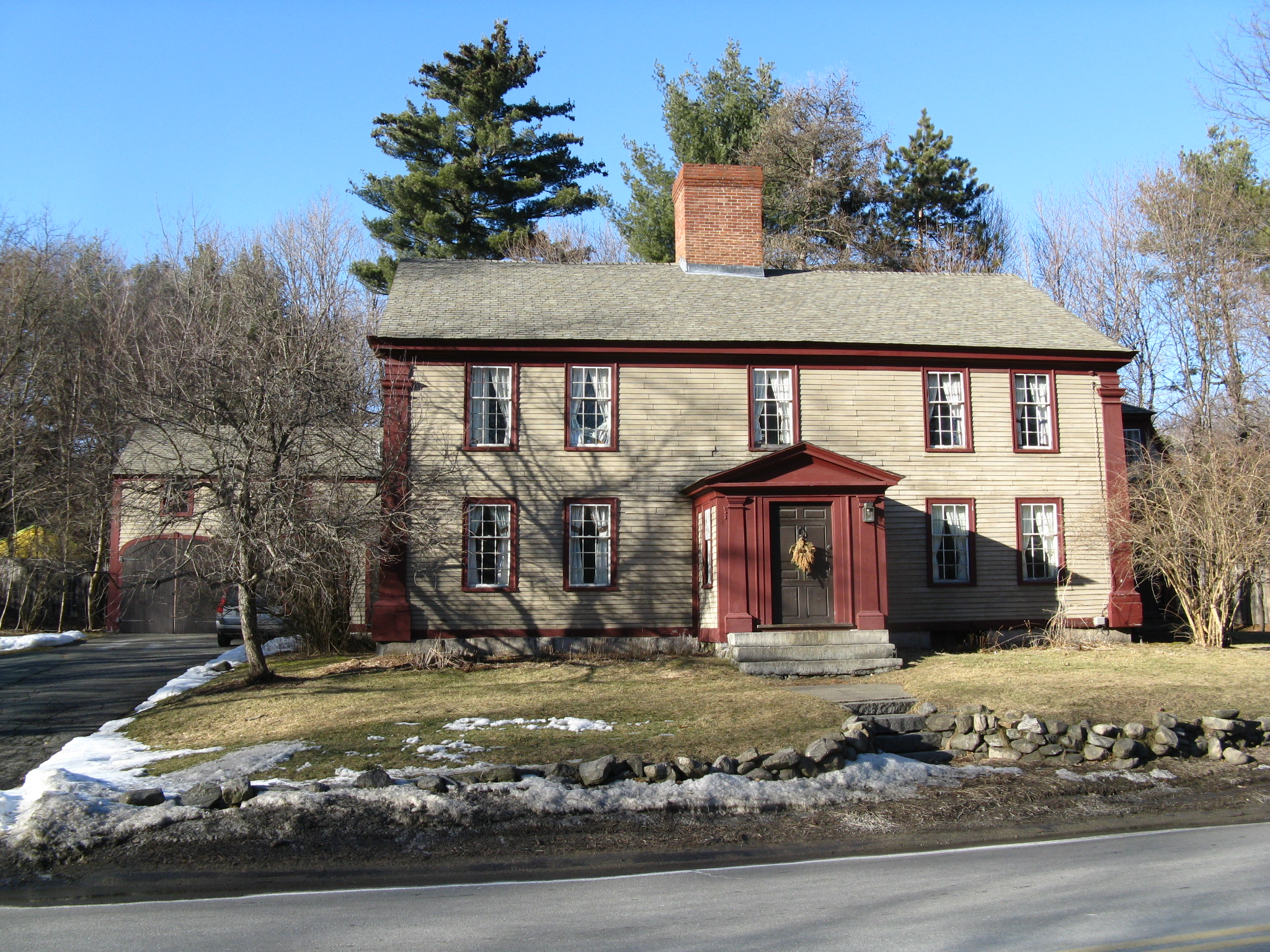

- Location within Massachusetts Location within the United States
- Location: 572 Main Street, Concord, Massachusetts
- Coordinates: 42°27′26″N 71°22′13″W
- Architectural style: Colonial
- MPS: First Period Buildings of Eastern Massachusetts TR
- NRHP reference No.: 90000170
- Added to NRHP: March 9, 1990

The Joseph Hosmer House is a historic First Period house located in Concord, Massachusetts.

== Description and history ==
The house is a 2 1/2-story timber-frame structure, with a large central chimney and an eastern ell. Its construction history is unclear: the halves of the main block (on either side of the chimney) may have been built at the same time, or the eastern half may have been built at the same time the eastern ell (originally a separate structure) was added c. 1757. Stylistic evidence suggests that the oldest portion of the main block was built c. 1672, with the rest of the house dating to around 1757, when it was assembled by Major Joseph Hosmer.

The house was added to the National Register of Historic Places on March 9, 1990.

== See also ==
- National Register of Historic Places listings in Concord, Massachusetts
