= Wright's Tavern =

- U.S. National Register of Historic Places
- U.S. National Historic Landmark
- U.S. Historic district – Contributing property
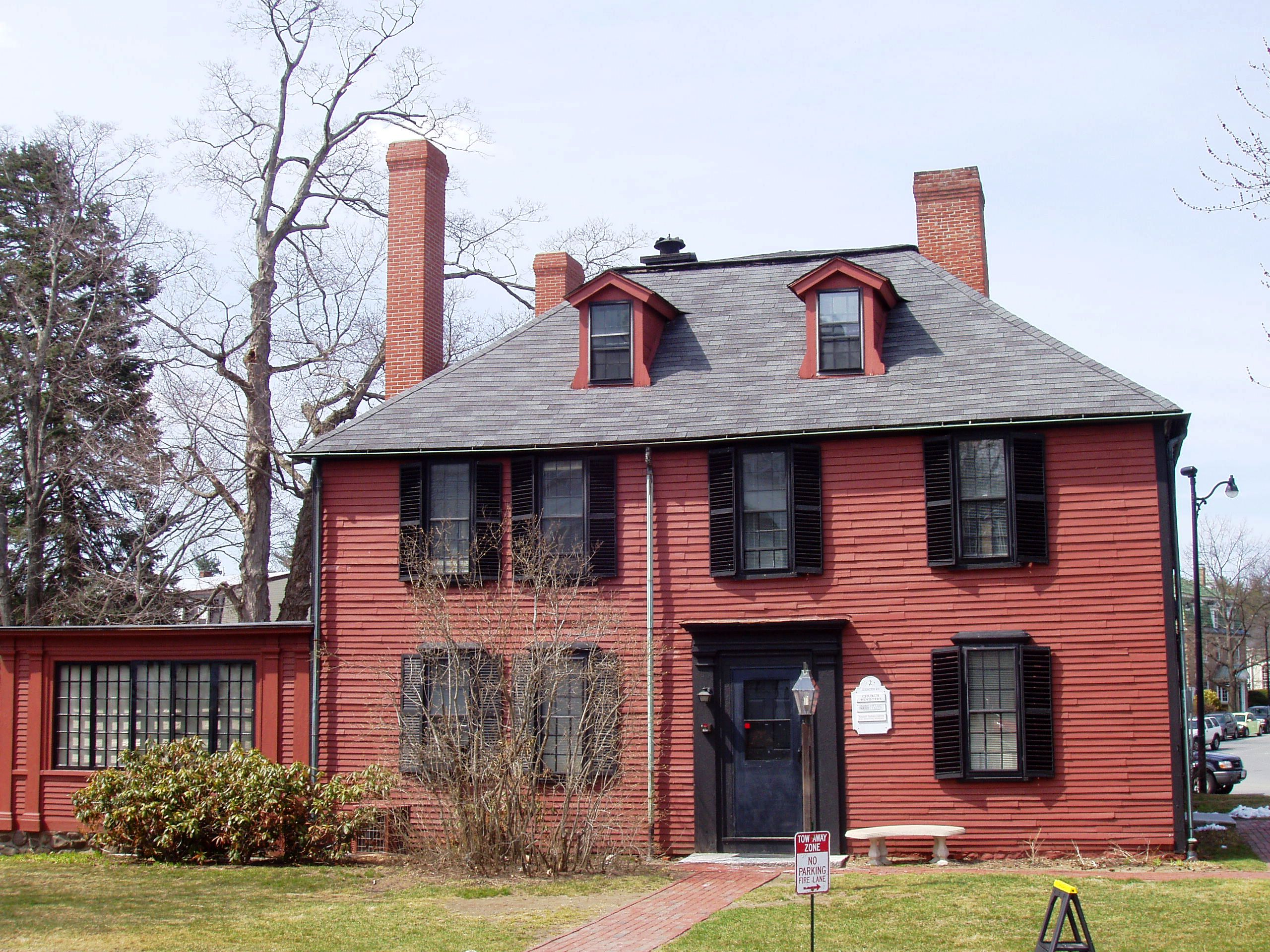
- Wright's Tavern

- Location within Massachusetts Location within the United States
- Location: Concord, Massachusetts
- Coordinates: 42°27′36″N 71°20′57″W
- Built: 1747
- Part of: Concord Monument Square-Lexington Road Historic District (ID77000172)
- NRHP reference No.: 66000793

Significant dates
- Added to NRHP: October 15, 1966
- Designated NHL: January 20, 1961
- Designated CP: September 13, 1977

Wright's Tavern is a historic tavern located in the center of Concord, Massachusetts. It is now a National Historic Landmark owned by the Society of the First Parish, Concord, with important associations with the Battle of Lexington and Concord at the start of the American Revolution.

== Overview ==
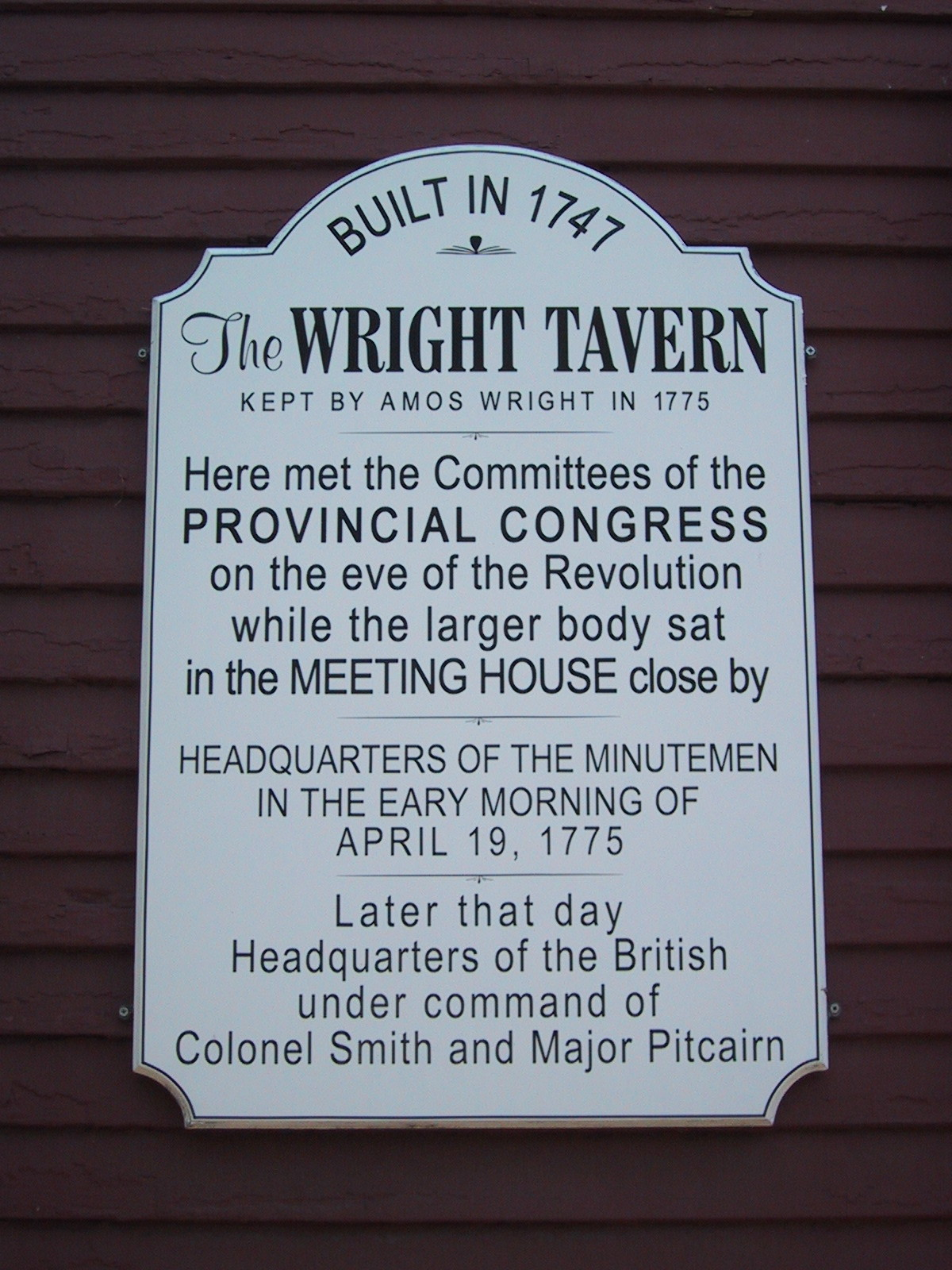
Information plaque from the front of the Tavern

Wright's Tavern was built in 1747 by Ephraim Jones, who operated it until 1751. At the dawn of the American Revolution in April 1775, it was managed by Amos Wright, whose name it has borne ever since. On April 19, the day of the Battle of Lexington and Concord, when the courthouse bell announced the approach of Major Pitcairn's British troops, the Concord Minutemen assembled at Wright's Tavern. Later, after Pitcairn's arrival in the Concord square, British officers refreshed themselves in the tavern.

The tavern also has earlier links to the Massachusetts Provincial Congress which met next door in October 1774, in the First Parish Church. With John Hancock as president and Benjamin Lincoln as secretary, the Congress consisted of 300 delegates from Massachusetts towns who passed measures ending tax payments to the Crown and organizing a militia force to defy King George III by arms if necessary. Wright's Tavern was used as a meeting place for committees of the Congress during the 5-day session.

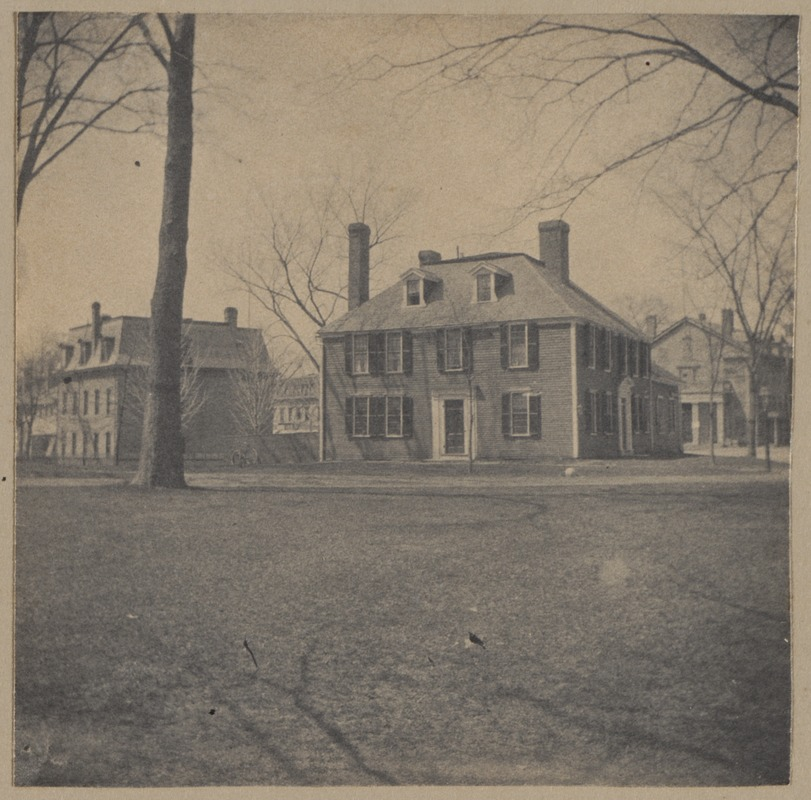
Wright's Tavern ca. 1895–1905. Archive of Photographic Documentation of Early Massachusetts Architecture, Boston Public Library.

Since the Revolution the building has been put to many uses. Today the tavern is still in good condition with red clapboards and a double-hipped (monitor) roof above its two main stories. It is being restored to its 1775 condition as a museum and scheduled to open in 2024.

== See also ==
- List of National Historic Landmarks in Massachusetts
- National Register of Historic Places listings in Concord, Massachusetts
