= Punkatasset Hill =

Hill in Concord, Massachusetts, United States

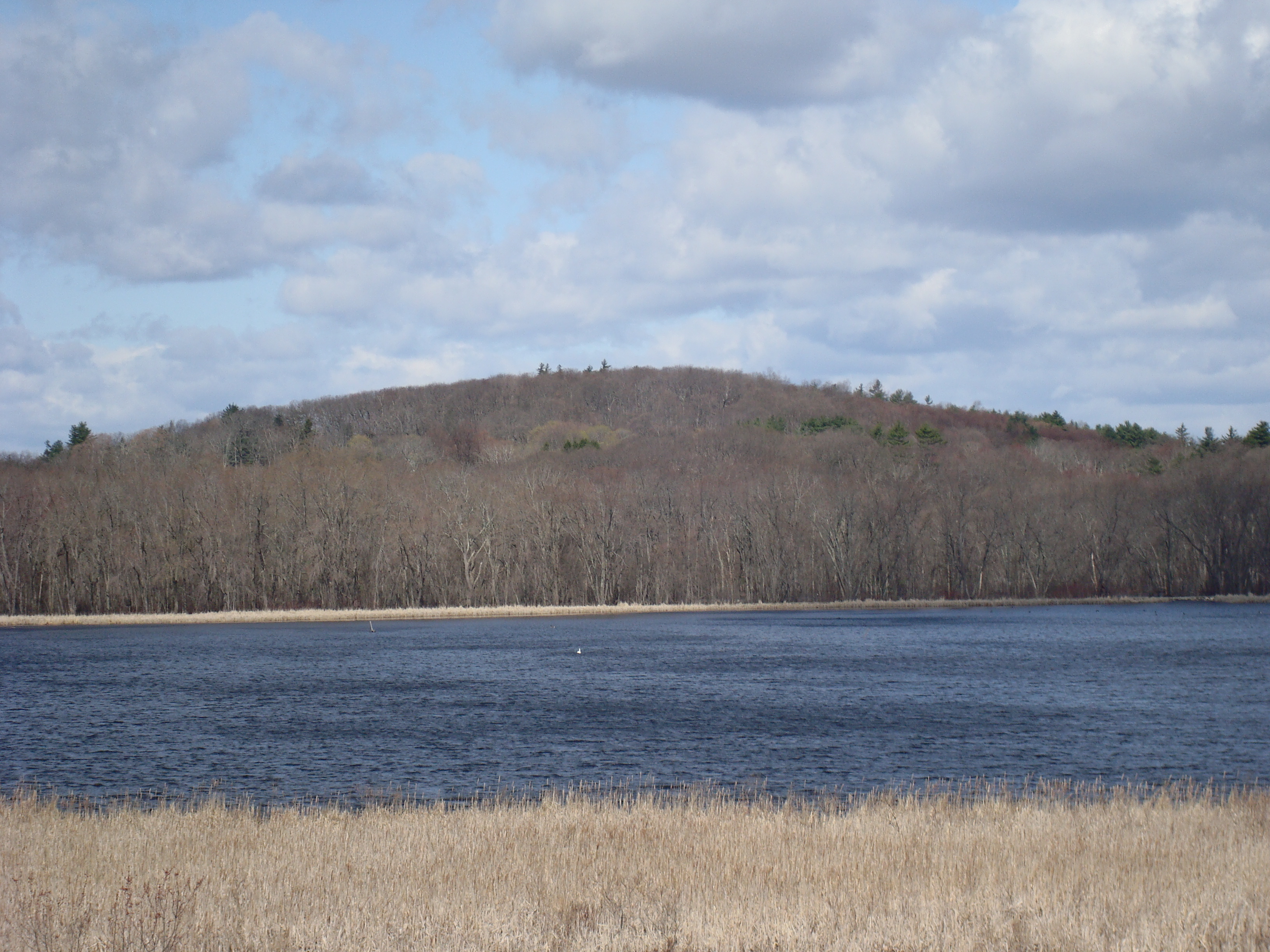
- Punkatasset Hill in early spring

Highest point
- Elevation: 289 ft (88 m)
- Coordinates: 42.481483°N 71.346726°W

Naming
- English translation: "Shallow Brook"
- Language of name: Natick Indian

Geography
- Location: Concord, Massachusetts, United States

Climbing
- Easiest route: Estabrook Woods/ Punkatasset Hill Conservation Land Trail

Punkatasset Hill is a hill in Concord, Massachusetts, in the United States. At 289 feet (88 m), it is one of the highest points in the town.

The hill was formerly called Broad-topped Hill by the native Indians and was cultivated and farmed from the 17th century on.

It was used as a vantage point by Concord Minutemen during the Battles of Lexington and Concord, in 1775.

In the late 19th century, on clear days, Boston, Mount Wachusett, and Mount Monadnock were visible from the summit. In the early 20th century, Punkatasset Hill had Concord's only ski slope. There was never a ski lift, but ski jumping contests were held there in the 1930s. Today the slope is cleared, but not used for skiing.

In 1971 the land ceased to be private property, when it was sold to the town and designated as conservation land. Today, Punkatasset Hill and the adjacent Estabrook Woods are popular hiking and walking destinations.
