= Concord, Massachusetts =

- Town
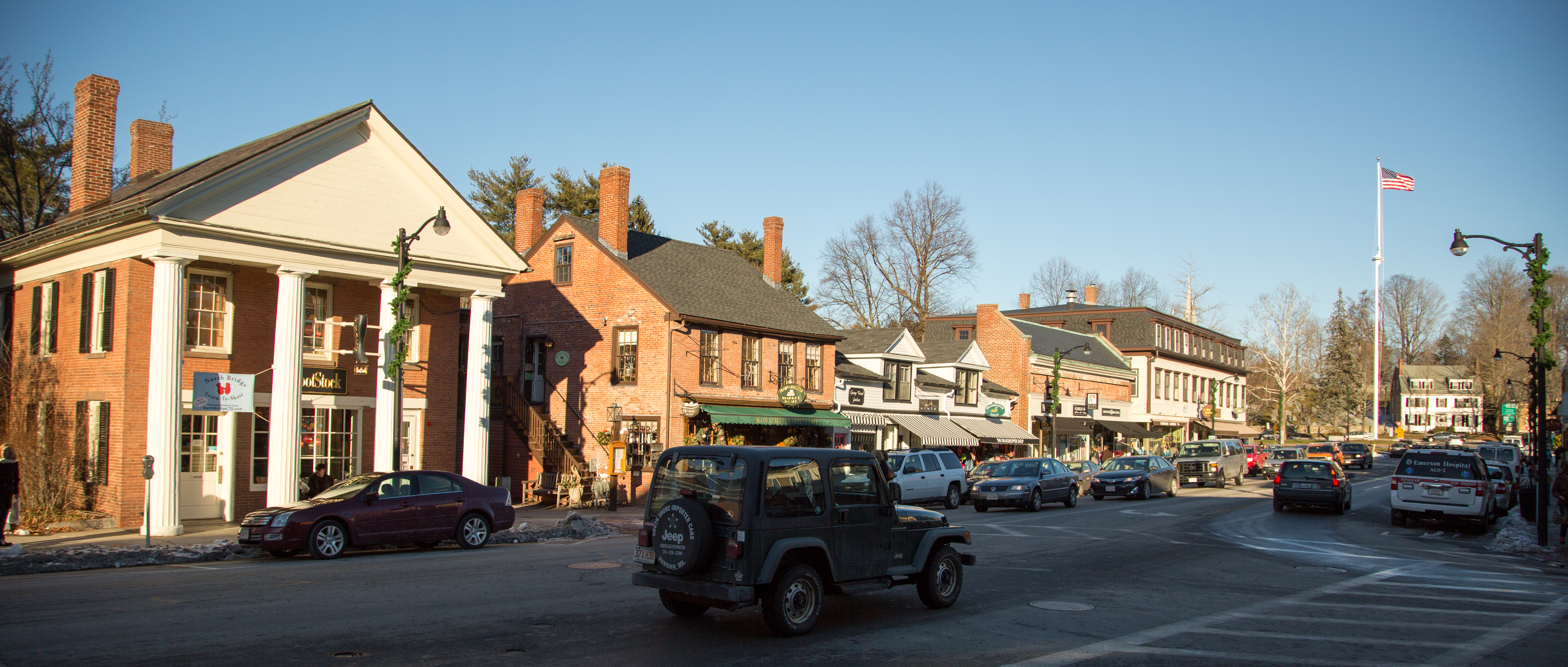
- Concord's Main Street in 2012

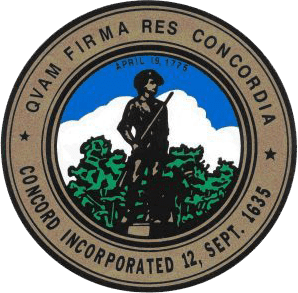
- Seal
- Motto: Quam Firma Res Concordia (Latin) "How Strong Is Harmony"
- Location in Middlesex County, Massachusetts

- Location within Greater Boston area Location within Massachusetts Location within the United States
- Coordinates: 42°27′37″N 71°20′58″W
- Country: United States
- State: Massachusetts
- County: Middlesex
- Settled: 1635
- Incorporated: September 12, 1635
- Founded by: Peter Bulkley and Simon Willard

Government
  - Type: Open town meeting
  - Town Manager: Kerry Lafleur

Area
  - Total: 26.0 sq mi (67.4 km^{2})
  - Land: 24.9 sq mi (64.5 km^{2})
  - Water: 0.97 sq mi (2.5 km^{2})
- Elevation: 141 ft (43 m)

Population (2020)
  - Total: 18,491
  - Density: 743/sq mi (287/km^{2})
- Time zone: UTC−5 (Eastern)
  - Summer (DST): UTC−4 (Eastern)
- ZIP Code: 01742
- Area code: 351 / 978
- FIPS code: 25-15060
- GNIS feature ID: 0619398
- Website: www.concordma.gov

Concord (/ˈkɒŋkərd/) is a town in Middlesex County, Massachusetts, United States. In the 2020 census, the town population was 18,491. It contains the census-designated place of West Concord. The United States Census Bureau considers Concord part of Greater Boston. The town center is near where the Sudbury and Assabet rivers join to form the Concord River.

The town was established in 1635 by a group of English settlers as the first inland colonial settlement in New England. By 1775, the population had grown to 1,400.

As dissension between colonists in North America and the British crown intensified, 700 troops were sent to confiscate militia ordnance stored at Concord on April 19, 1775. The ensuing conflict, the battles of Lexington and Concord, were the incidents (including the shot heard round the world) which triggered the American Revolutionary War.

A rich literary community developed in Concord during the mid-19th century, centered around Ralph Waldo Emerson. Emerson's circle included Nathaniel Hawthorne, Louisa May Alcott and Henry David Thoreau. Major works written in Concord during this period include Alcott's novel Little Women, Emerson's essay Self-Reliance, and Thoreau's Walden and Civil Disobedience. In this era, the now-ubiquitous Concord grape was developed in Concord by Ephraim Wales Bull. Until 2025, major grape juice producer Welch's was headquartered there.

In the 20th century, Concord developed into an affluent Boston suburb and tourist destination, drawing visitors to the Old North Bridge, Orchard House and Walden Pond. The town retains its literary culture and is home to notable authors, including Doris Kearns Goodwin, Alan Lightman and Gregory Maguire. Concord is also notable for its progressive and environmentalist politics, becoming in 2012 the first community in the United States to ban single-serving PET bottles.

== History ==
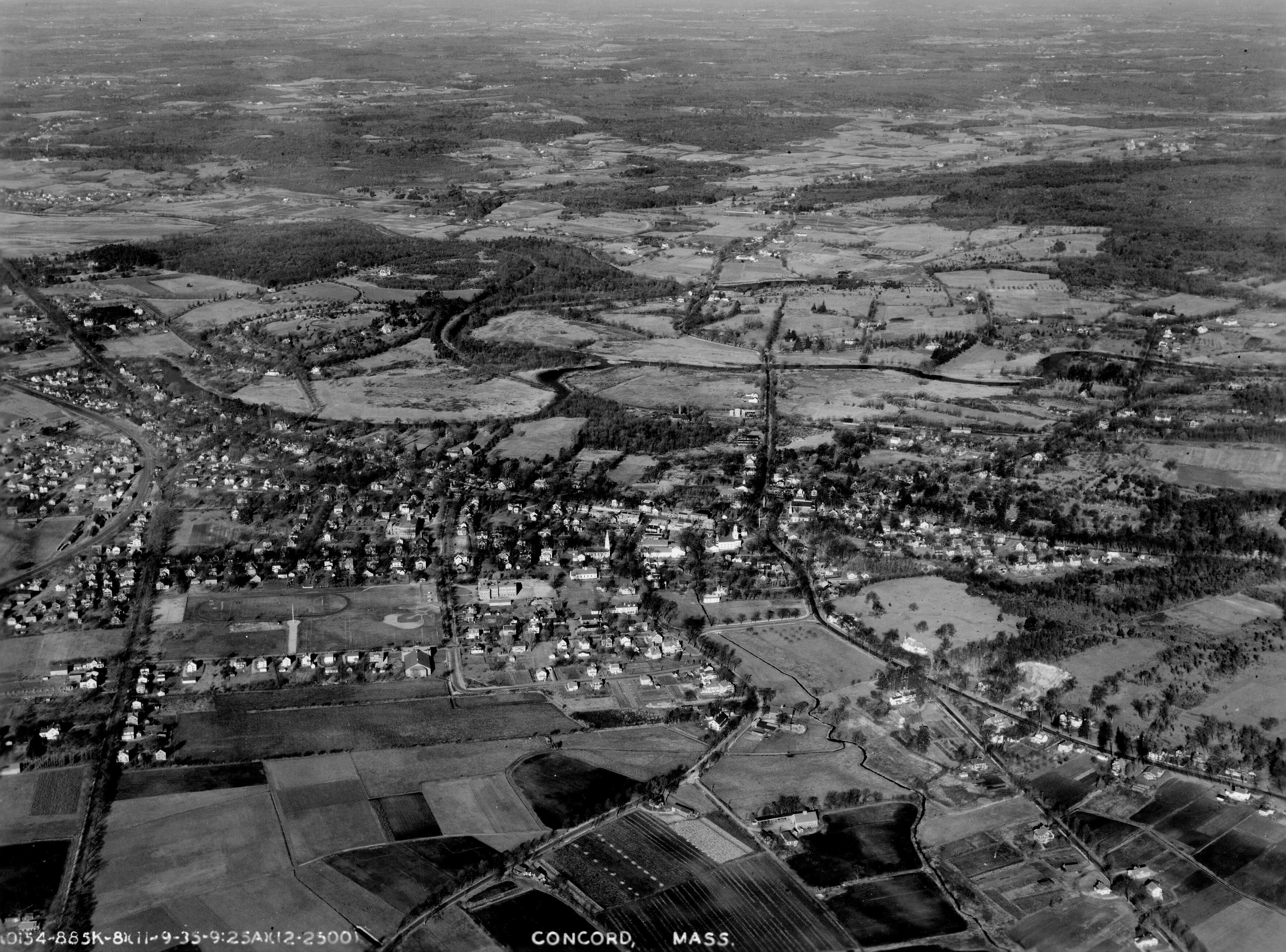
Aerial view, looking northwest, December 1935

=== Prehistory and founding ===
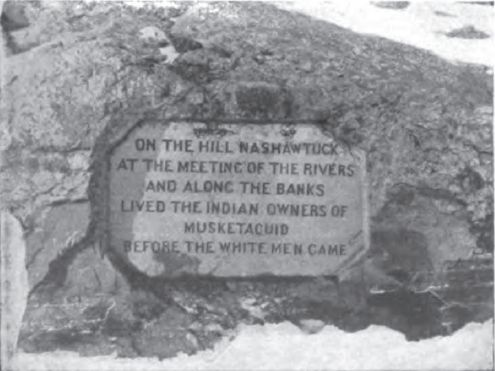
Photo of Egg Rock inscription, c. 1904

The area which became the town of Concord was originally known as "Musketaquid", situated at the confluence of the Sudbury and Assabet rivers. The name was an Algonquian word for "grassy plain", fitting the area's low-lying marshes and kettle holes. Native Americans had cultivated corn crops there; the rivers were rich with fish and the land was lush and arable. The area was largely depopulated in 1633 by an epidemic of smallpox, a disease likely to have been introduced to the New World by European explorers and settlers.

In 1635, a group of English settlers led by Rev. Peter Bulkley and Major Simon Willard received a land grant from the General Court and negotiated a land purchase with the local indigenous tribes. Bulkeley was an influential religious leader who "carried a good number of planters with him into the woods"; Willard was a canny trader who spoke the Algonquian language and had gained the trust of Native Americans. They exchanged wampum, hatchets, knives, cloth and other useful items for the six-square-mile (16 km^{2}) purchase from Squaw Sachem of Mistick, which formed the basis of the new town, called "Concord" in appreciation of the peaceful acquisition.

=== Battles of Lexington and Concord ===
The battles of Lexington and Concord were the first military engagements of the American Revolutionary War. On April 19, 1775, 700 British Army troops led by Lieutenant-Colonel Francis Smith marched from Boston to Concord to confiscate a cache of arms stored in the town. Unbeknownst to them, Patriot leaders had moved most of the cache elsewhere. Around 150 Patriot minutemen from local towns, who had been forewarned of the Army's march by Samuel Prescott on April 18, quickly mustered and confronted the British in Lexington. Though who fired the first shot is unknown, a firefight broke out and the British fired a volley at the Americans before dispersing them with a bayonet charge, killing eight. The British proceeded into Concord and dispersed into company-sized formations to search for the cache. At 11:00am, 400 minutemen engaged 100 British troops at the Old North Bridge, leading to a number of casualties on both sides and forcing them to fall back and rejoin the Army's main force.

After the British completed their search for the cache in Concord, they marched back to Boston, but were constantly attacked by minutemen in hit-and-run attacks, suffering more casualties before reaching Charlestown. The minutemen then blockaded the narrow land accesses to Charlestown, initiating the siege of Boston. Poet Ralph Waldo Emerson subsequently described the shot fired by the minutemen at the Old North Bridge in his 1837 poem "Concord Hymn" as the "shot heard round the world". In 1894, the Lexington Historical Society petitioned the Massachusetts State Legislature to proclaim April 19 "Lexington Day"; Concord countered with "Concord Day". Governor Frederic T. Greenhalge opted for a compromise, proclaiming the day as Patriots' Day. In April 1975, Concord hosted a bicentennial celebration of the battle, featuring an address at the Old North Bridge by President Gerald Ford.

=== Literary history ===
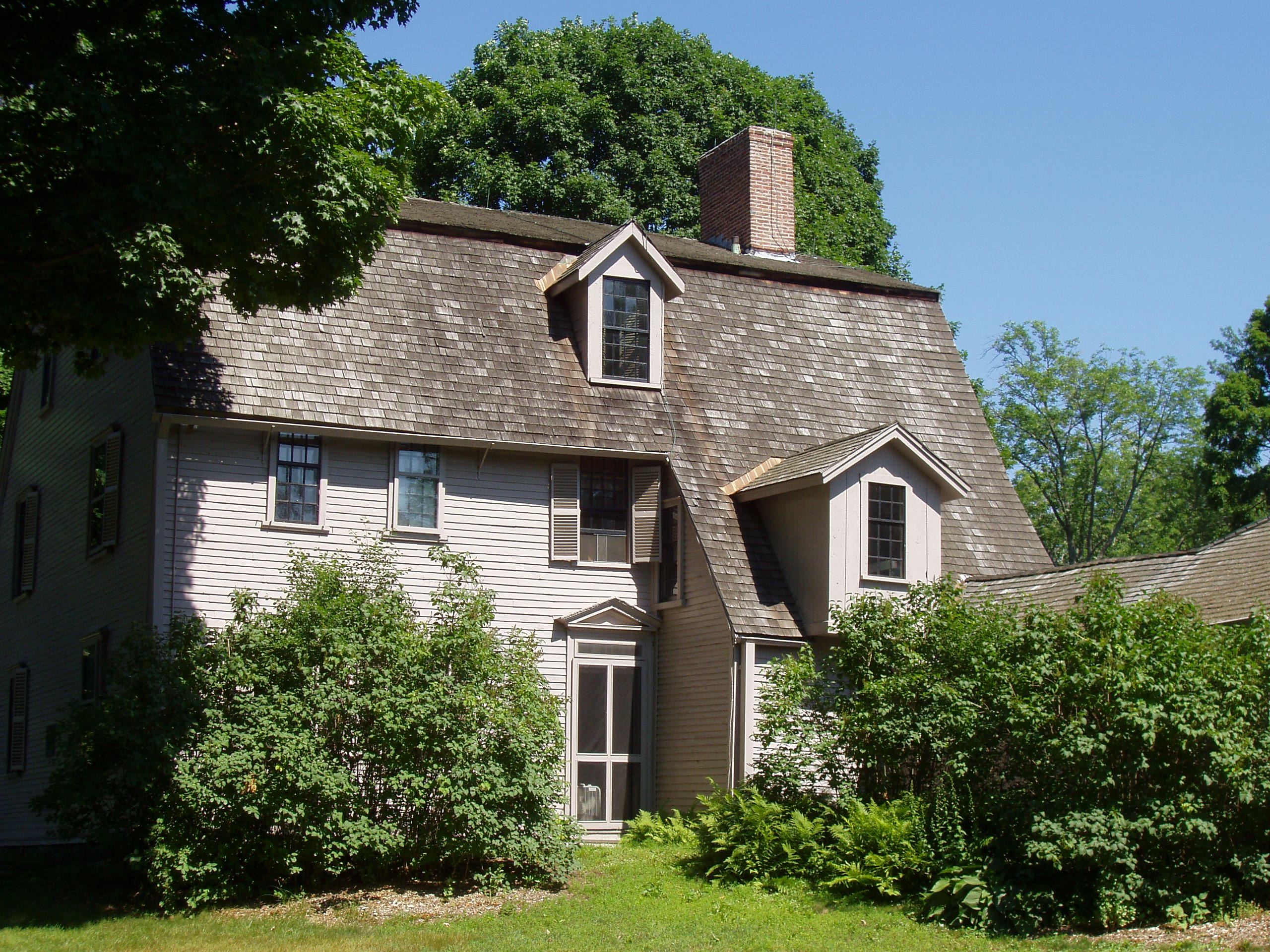
The Old Manse, home to Ralph Waldo Emerson and later Nathaniel Hawthorne

Concord has a remarkably rich literary history centered in the 19th century around Ralph Waldo Emerson (1803–1882), who moved there in 1835 and quickly became its most prominent citizen. A successful lecturer and philosopher, Emerson had deep roots in the town: his father, Rev. William Emerson (1769–1811), grew up in Concord before becoming an eminent Boston minister, and his grandfather, William Emerson Sr., witnessed the battle at the North Bridge from his house, and later became a chaplain in the Continental Army. Emerson was at the center of a group of like-minded Transcendentalists living in Concord. Among them were the author Nathaniel Hawthorne (1804–1864) and the philosopher Amos Bronson Alcott (1799–1888), the father of Louisa May Alcott (1832–1888). A native Concordian, Henry David Thoreau (1817–1862) was another notable member of Emerson's circle. This substantial collection of literary talent in one small town led Henry James to dub Concord "the biggest little place in America."

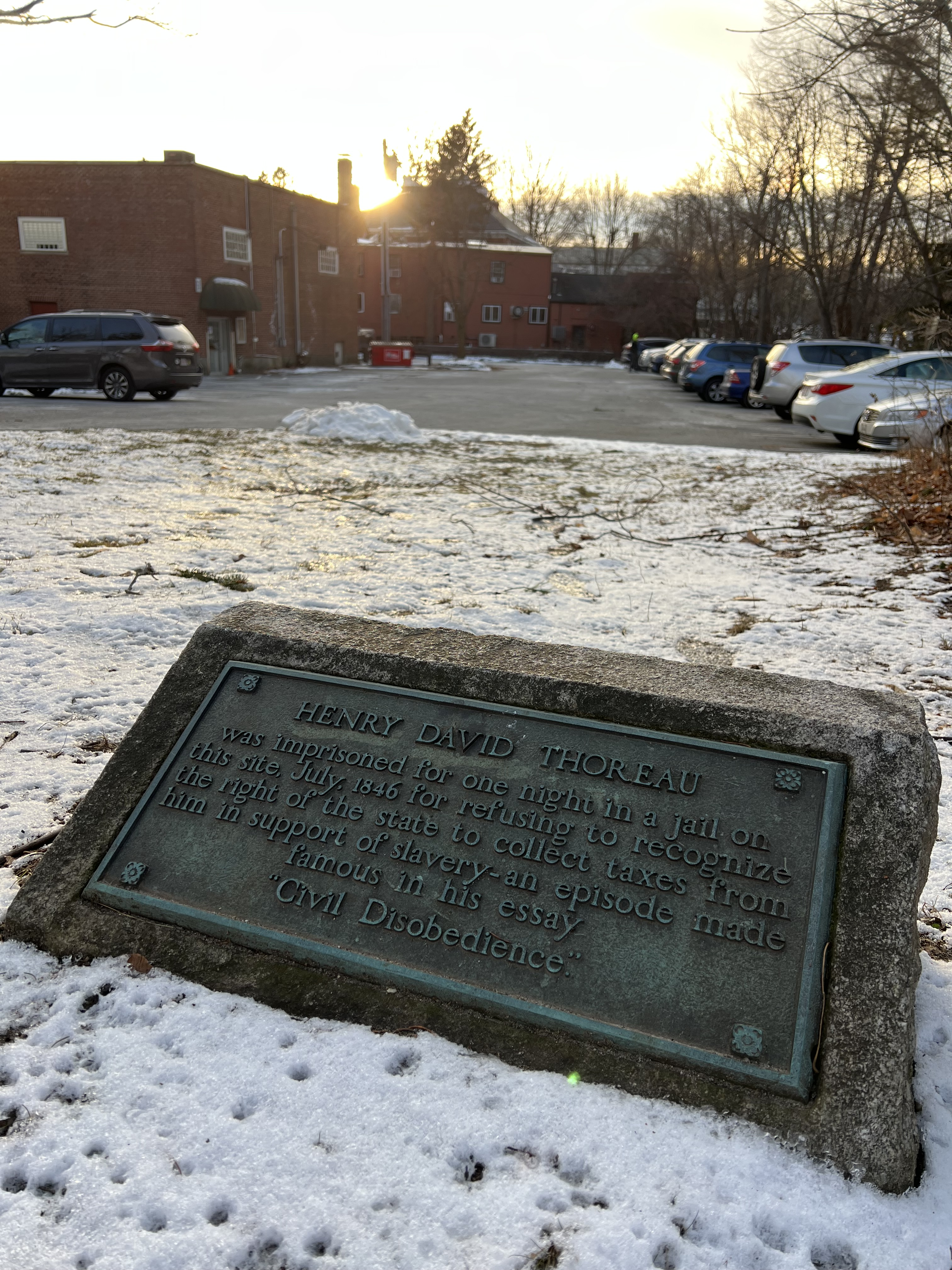
A marker at the location where Thoreau was imprisoned in Concord

Among the products of this intellectually stimulating environment were Emerson's many essays, including Self-Reliance (1841), Louisa May Alcott's novel Little Women (1868), and Hawthorne's story collection Mosses from an Old Manse (1846). Thoreau famously lived in a small cabin near Walden Pond, where he wrote Walden (1854). After being imprisoned in the Concord jail for refusing to pay taxes in political protest against slavery and the Mexican–American War, Thoreau penned the influential essay "Resistance to Civil Government", popularly known as Civil Disobedience (1849). Evidencing their strong political beliefs through actions, Thoreau and many of his neighbors served as station masters and agents on the Underground Railroad.

The Wayside, a house on Lexington Road, has been home to several authors. It was occupied by scientist John Winthrop (1714–1779) when Harvard College was temporarily moved to Concord during the Revolutionary War. The Wayside was later the home of the Alcott family (who referred to it as "Hillside"); the Alcotts sold it to Hawthorne in 1852, and the family moved into the adjacent Orchard House in 1858. Hawthorne dubbed the house "The Wayside" and lived there until his death. The house was purchased in 1883 by Boston publisher Daniel Lothrop and his wife, Harriett, who wrote the Five Little Peppers series and other children's books under the pen name Margaret Sidney. Today, The Wayside and the Orchard House are both museums. Emerson, Thoreau, Hawthorne and the Alcotts are buried on Authors' Ridge in Concord's Sleepy Hollow Cemetery.

The 20th-century composer Charles Ives wrote his Concord Sonata (c. 1904–1915) as a series of impressionistic portraits of literary figures associated with the town. Concord maintains a lively literary culture to this day; notable authors who have called the town home in recent years include Doris Kearns Goodwin, Alan Lightman, Robert B. Parker and Gregory Maguire.

=== Concord grape ===
In 1849, Ephraim Wales Bull developed the now-ubiquitous Concord grape at his home on Lexington Road, where the original vine still grows. Welch's, the first company to sell grape juice, maintains a headquarters in Concord. The Boston-born Bull developed the Concord grape by experimenting with seeds from some of the native species. On his farm outside Concord, down the road from the Emerson, Thoreau, Hawthorne and Alcott homesteads, he planted some 22,000 seedlings before producing the ideal grape. Early ripening, to escape the killing northern frosts, but with a rich, full-bodied flavor, the hardy Concord grape thrives where European cuttings had failed to survive. In 1853, Bull felt ready to put the first bunches of Concord grapes before the public and won a prize at the Boston Horticultural Society Exhibition. From these early arbors, the fame of Bull's Concord grape spread worldwide, bringing him up to $1,000 a cutting, but he died a relatively poor man. The inscription on his tombstone reads, "He sowed—others reaped."

=== Plastic bottle ban ===
On September 5, 2012, Concord became the first community in the United States to approve a ban on the sale of water in single-serving plastic bottles. The law banned the sale of PET bottles of one liter (34 U.S. fl oz) or less starting January 1, 2013. The ban provoked national controversy. An editorial in the Los Angeles Times characterized the ban as "born of convoluted reasoning" and "wrongheaded." Some residents believed the ban would do little to affect the sales of bottled water, which was still highly accessible in the surrounding areas, and that it restricted consumers' freedom of choice. Opponents also considered the ban to unfairly target one product in particular, when other, less healthy alternatives such as soda and fruit juice were still readily available in bottled form.

Nonetheless, subsequent efforts to repeal the ban failed in open town meetings. An effort to repeal Concord's ban on the sale of plastic water bottles was resoundingly defeated at a Town Meeting. Resident Jean Hill, who led the initial fight for the ban, said, "I really feel at the age of 86 that I've really accomplished something." Town Moderator Eric Van Loon did not even bother taking an official tally because opposition to repeal was so overwhelming. It appeared that upwards of 80 to 90 percent of the 1,127 voters in attendance raised their ballots against the repeal measure.

The issue had been bubbling in Concord for several years prior to the ban. In 2010, a ban approved in a town meeting, which wasn't written as a bylaw, was rejected by the state attorney general's office. In 2011, a new version of the ban narrowly failed at a town meeting by a vote of 265 to 272. The ban on selling water in polyethylene terephthalate (PET) bottles of one liter or less passed in 2012 by a vote of 403 to 364, and a repeal effort in April failed by a vote of 621 to 687.

== Geography ==
According to the United States Census Bureau, the town has a total area of 25.9 square miles (67 km^{2}), of which 24.9 square miles (64 km^{2}) is land and 1.0 square mile (2.6 km^{2}), or 3.75%, is water. The city of Lowell is 13 miles (21 km) to the north, Boston is 19 miles (31 km) to the east, and Nashua, New Hampshire, is 23 miles (37 km) to the north.

Massachusetts state routes 2, 2A, 62, 126, 119, 111 and 117 pass through Concord. The town center is near the confluence of the Sudbury and Assabet rivers, forming the Concord River, which flows north to the Merrimack River in Lowell. Gunpowder was manufactured from 1835 to 1940 in the American Powder Mills complex extending upstream along the Assabet River.

== Government ==
Local government consists of a five-member executive Select Board and a legislature utilizing open town meeting.

On the federal level, Concord is part of Massachusetts's 3rd congressional district, represented by Lori Trahan. The state's senior (Class I) member of the United States Senate is Elizabeth Warren. The junior (Class II) senator is Ed Markey.

== Demographics ==
Historical population
Year	Pop.	±%
1790	1,590	—
1850	2,249	+41.4%
1860	2,246	−0.1%
1870	2,412	+7.4%
1880	3,922	+62.6%
1890	4,427	+12.9%
1900	5,652	+27.7%
1910	6,421	+13.6%
1920	6,461	+0.6%
1930	7,477	+15.7%
1940	7,972	+6.6%
1950	8,623	+8.2%
1960	12,517	+45.2%
1970	16,148	+29.0%
1980	16,293	+0.9%
1990	17,076	+4.8%
2000	16,993	−0.5%
2010	17,668	+4.0%
2020	18,491	+4.7%
2024*	18,092	−2.2%
*=population estimate. Source: United States census records and Population Estimates Program data.

At the 2020 census, there were 18,491 people, 7,295 housing units and 6,439 families residing in the town. The population density was 714.0 inhabitants per square mile (275.7/km^{2}). The average density of housing units was 282.0 per square mile (108.9/km^{2}). The racial makeup of the town was 82.94% White, 2.61% African American, 6.18% Asian, 4.55% Hispanic or Latino (of any race), 0.02% Native American, 0.02% Pacific Islander, 1.02% from other races, and 6.86% from two or more races.

There were 6,439 families, of which 35.98% had children under the age of 18 living with them, 62.98% were married couples living together, 22.4% had a female householder with no spouse present, 12.4% had a male householder with no spouse present, 28.42% were non-families and 24.59% of all households were made up of individuals. The average family size was 3.18.

25.1% of the population were under the age of 18, 4.2% from 18 to 24, 25.8% from 25 to 44, 28.4% from 45 to 64 and 16.5% who were 65 years of age or older. The median age was 42 years. For every 100 females, there were 100.3 males. For every 100 women aged 18 and over, there were 101.8 men.

At the time of the 2020 census, the median household income was $184,086. About 2.5% of the population was below the poverty line, including 1.7% of those under age 18 and 1.1% of those aged 65 or over.

== Media ==
=== Newspapers ===
In the past, Concord was served by the Concord Journal. The Journal eventually came under the ownership of Gannett, a nationwide newspaper chain, which cut staff and ended local reporting. While the Concord Journal is still printed weekly as of 2023, it only contains regional stories, with no Concord-specific reporting.

As a result of the decline of the Concord Journal, a group of residents created The Concord Bridge, a nonprofit weekly newspaper which is published both online and in a weekly print edition. Copies of the Bridge are mailed for free to all households in the town.

Inmates at the Massachusetts Correctional Institution – Concord, a former prison which has now been shut down, published several prison newspapers, including Our Paper, No Holds Barred, and Concord Community: Inside/Outside.

== Pronunciation ==
The town's name is pronounced by its residents as /ˈkɒŋkərd/ KONG-kərd, in a manner indistinguishable from the American pronunciation of the word "conquered." In the local dialect of Greater Boston, it is frequently heard with the [ər] in the second syllable replaced by [ʏ] ([ˈkɒŋkʏd]KAHN-kəd).

== Economy ==
=== Principal employers ===
According to Concord's 2022 Comprehensive Annual Financial Report, the principal employers in the town are:

#	Employer	# of Employees
1	Emerson Hospital	1,000+
2	Corrections Department (Commonwealth of Massachusetts)	500+
3	New England Deaconness (Newbury Court senior living facility)	100+
4	Atrius Health	100+
5	Care One of Concord (nursing and assisted living)	100+
6	Caring Companion Home Care	100+
7	Concord Academy (coeducational private high school)	100+
8	Dynasil Corporation of America (distributor)	100+

== Transportation ==
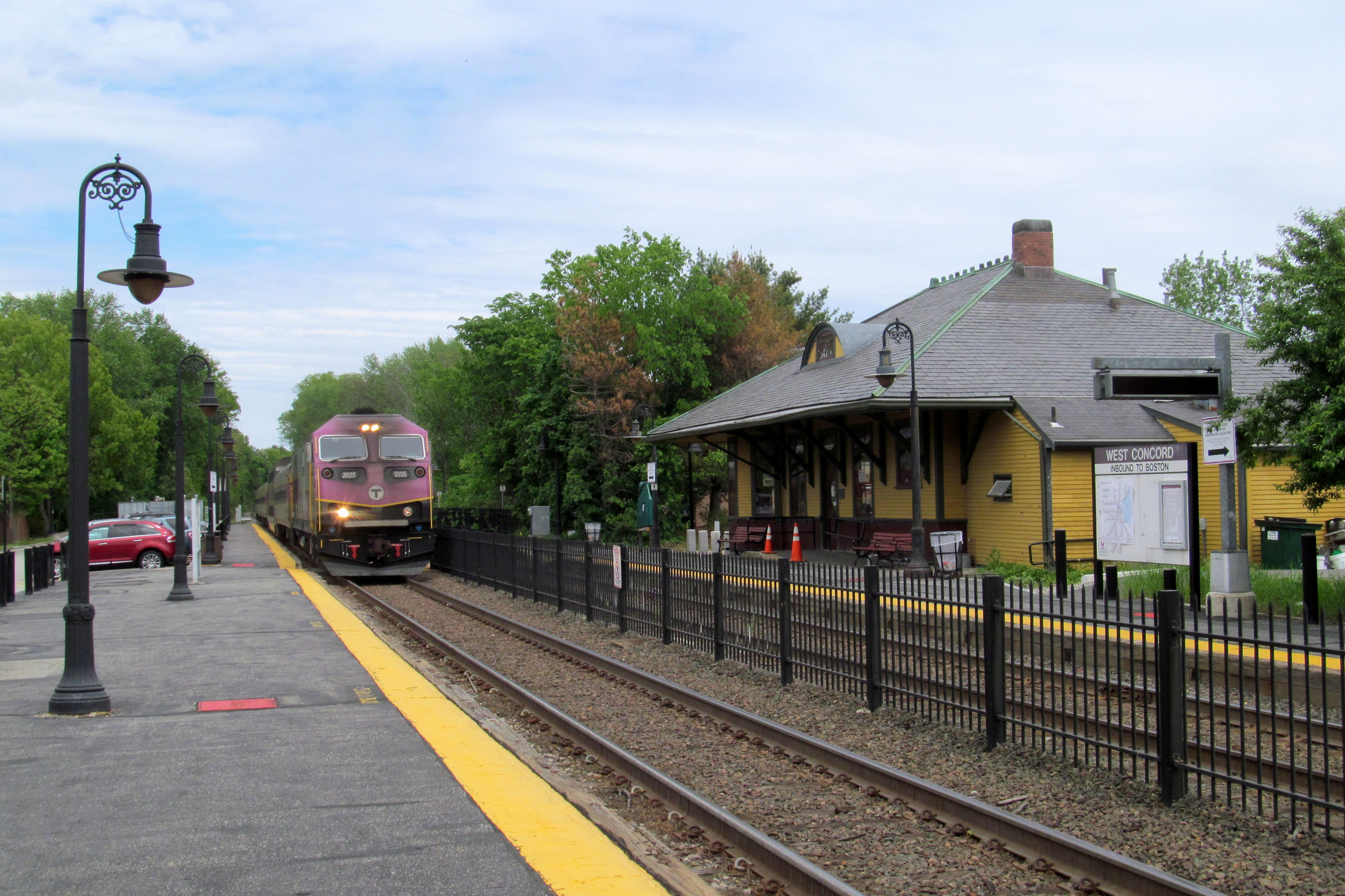
West Concord station

Concord and West Concord stations are served by the MBTA's Fitchburg Line. Yankee Line provides commuter bus service between Concord and Boston.

== Sister cities ==
Concord's sister cities are:

- Nanae, Japan
- Saint-Mandé, France

== Points of interest ==
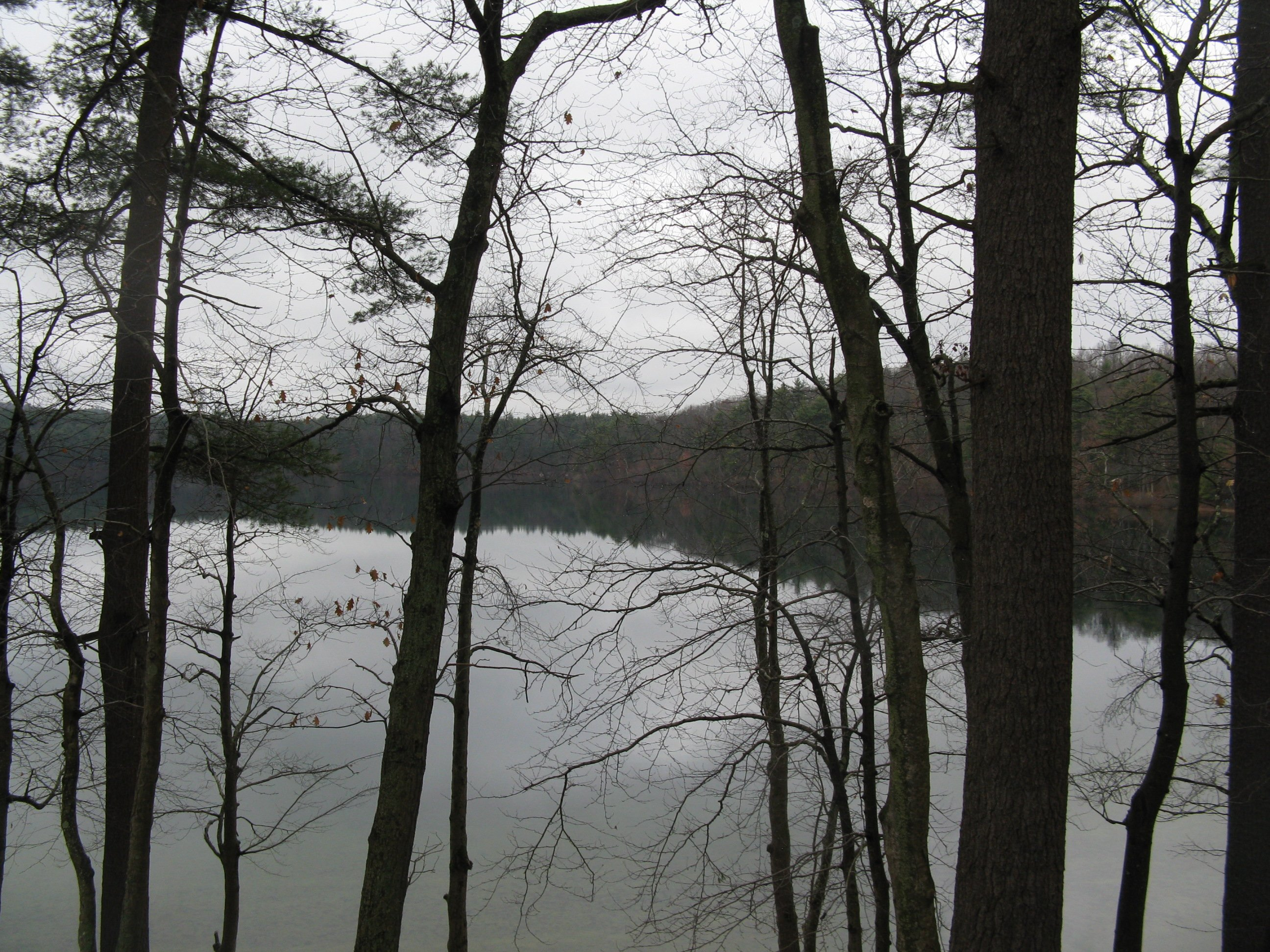
Walden Pond in November

- Barrett's Farm
- Reuben Brown House, home of notable revolutionist
- Concord Armory, home to the Concord Players
- Concord Art Association
- Concord Free Public Library
- Concord Museum
- Concord Scout House, popular venue for contra dancing and other events
- Concord's Colonial Inn
- Corinthian Lodge
- Egg Rock, where the Concord River forms at the confluence of the Sudbury and Assabet rivers
- Emerson Hospital
- Ralph Waldo Emerson House
- Estabrook Woods
- Fairyland Pond
- First Parish in Concord
- Great Meadows National Wildlife Refuge
- Massachusetts Correctional Institution – Concord
- Minute Man National Historical Park
  - The Minute Man statue
- Northeastern Correctional Center
- The Old Manse, home of Emerson and Hawthorne
- Old North Bridge
- Orchard House
- Punkatasset Hill
- Sleepy Hollow Cemetery
- Walden Pond
- The Wayside, home of Louisa May Alcott, Hawthorne, and Margaret Sidney
- Wheeler-Minot Farmhouse, also known as Thoreau Farm, birthplace of Henry David Thoreau
- Wright's Tavern

== Education ==
- Concord-Carlisle Regional High School, the local public high school
- Concord Middle School (Sanborn and Peabody, unified under the new Ellen Garrison building)
- Alcott School, Willard School, and Thoreau School, the local public elementary schools
- Concord Academy and Middlesex School, private preparatory schools
- The Fenn School is a 4–9 boys' school.
- The Nashoba Brooks School is co-ed PK–3 and a girls' school 4–8.

== In popular culture ==
Concord is featured in the 2012 video game Assassin's Creed 3, the 2020 video game Assassin's Creed Valhalla and the 2015 video game Fallout 4. The video game Walden, a game, based on Henry David Thoreau's Walden, is set in the town.

Scenes from the 2017 comedy film Daddy's Home 2 were filmed at the Concord Scout House. Parts of the 2019 film Little Women were shot on the Concord River.

Jane Langton's Homer Kelly murder mystery novels are largely set in Concord. Her 1964 novel The Transcendental Murder was described in the Boston Globe in 1975 as "a hymn to Concord, its history, its houses, its hallowed ground, its people and patriots, and its ghosts (Emerson and Thoreau)."

Italian director Lucio Fulci's 1981 horror film The House by the Cemetery was partly filmed in Concord, notably at the Holy Family Church, a Main Street realty and the Concord Free Public Library.

The Mother-Daughter Book Club series of children's novels is set in Concord.

== Gallery ==
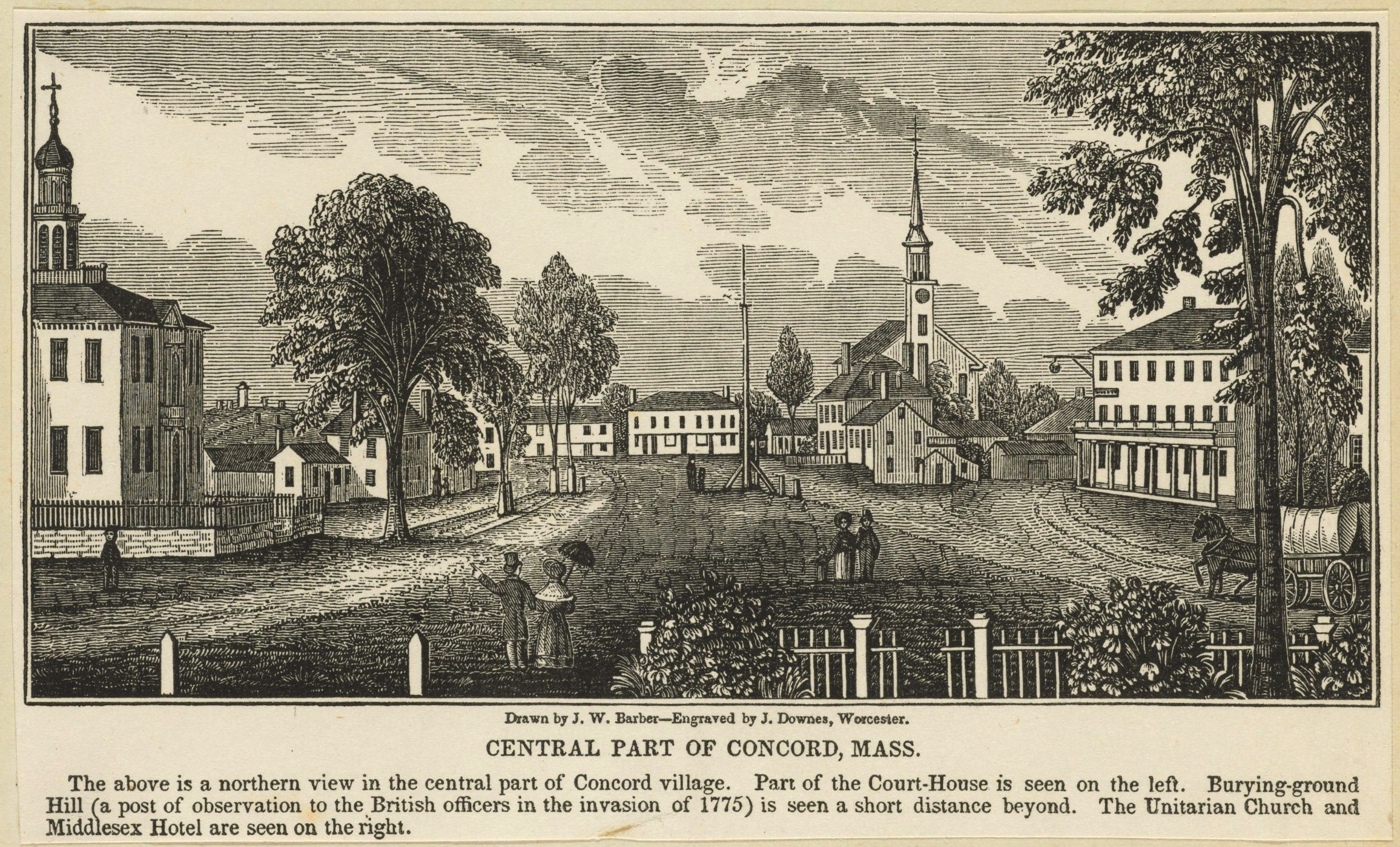
An engraving of the central part of Concord, c. 1840–44

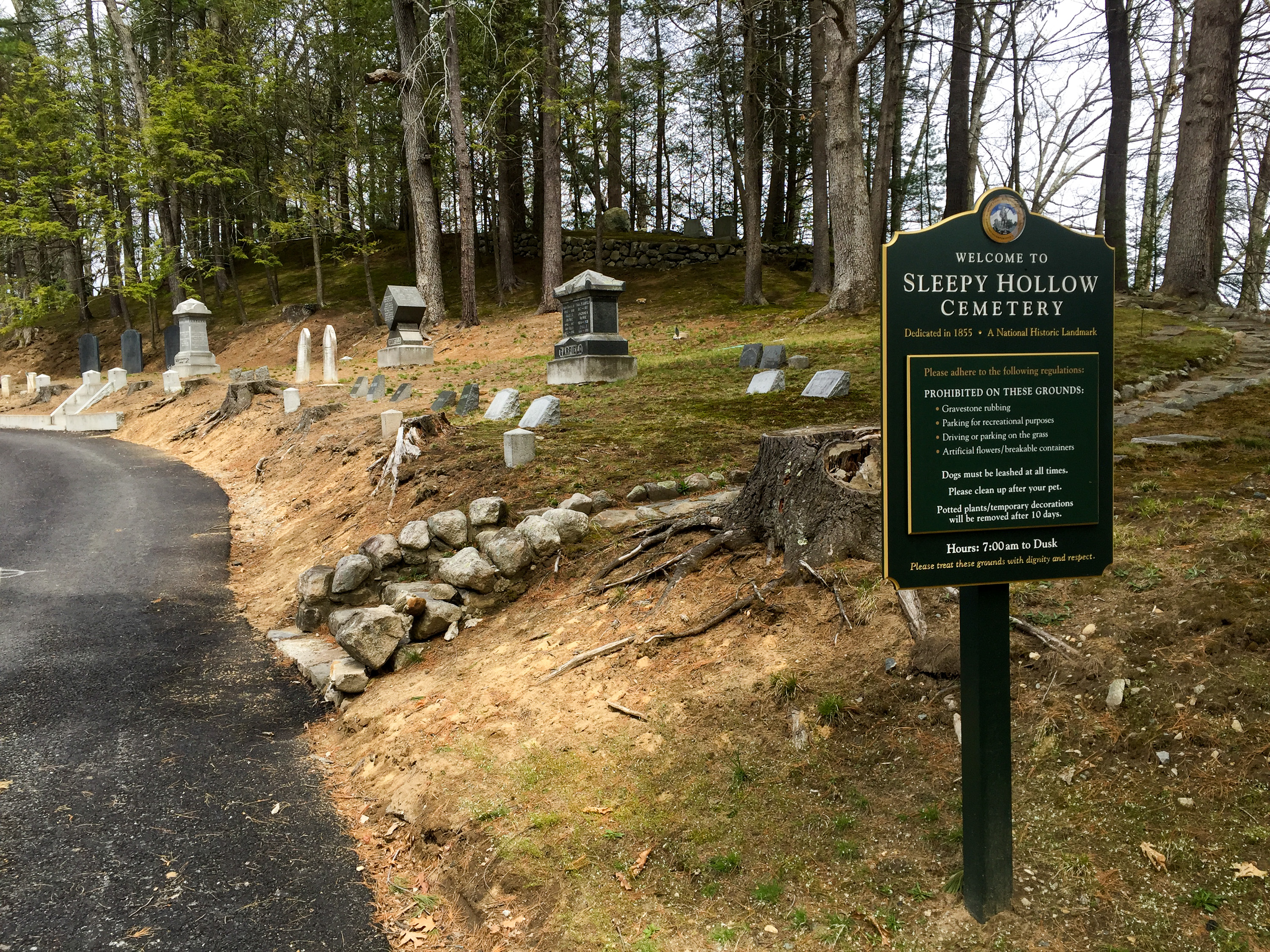
Sleepy Hollow Cemetery

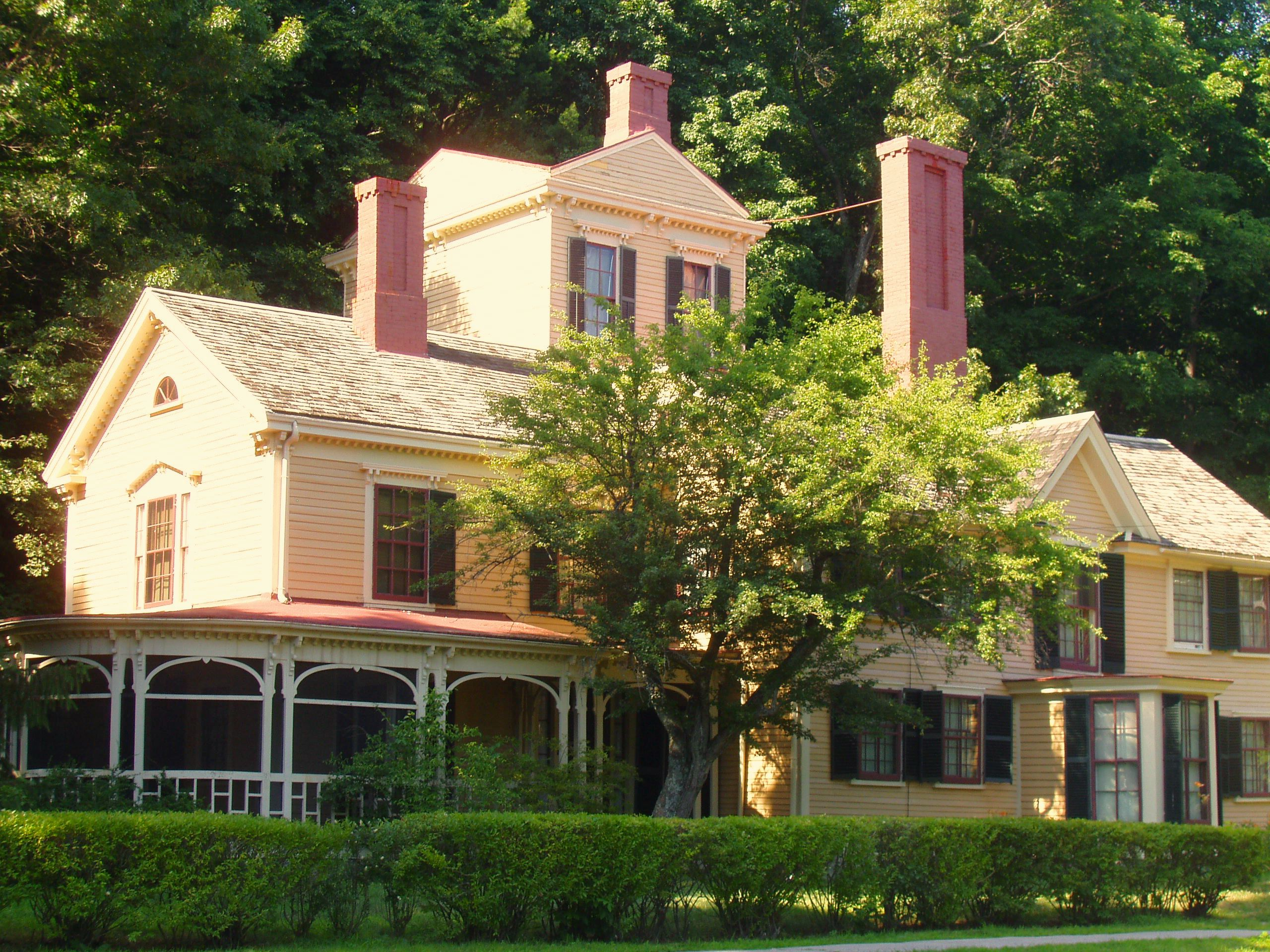
The Wayside, home in turn to Louisa May Alcott, Nathaniel Hawthorne, and Margaret Sidney

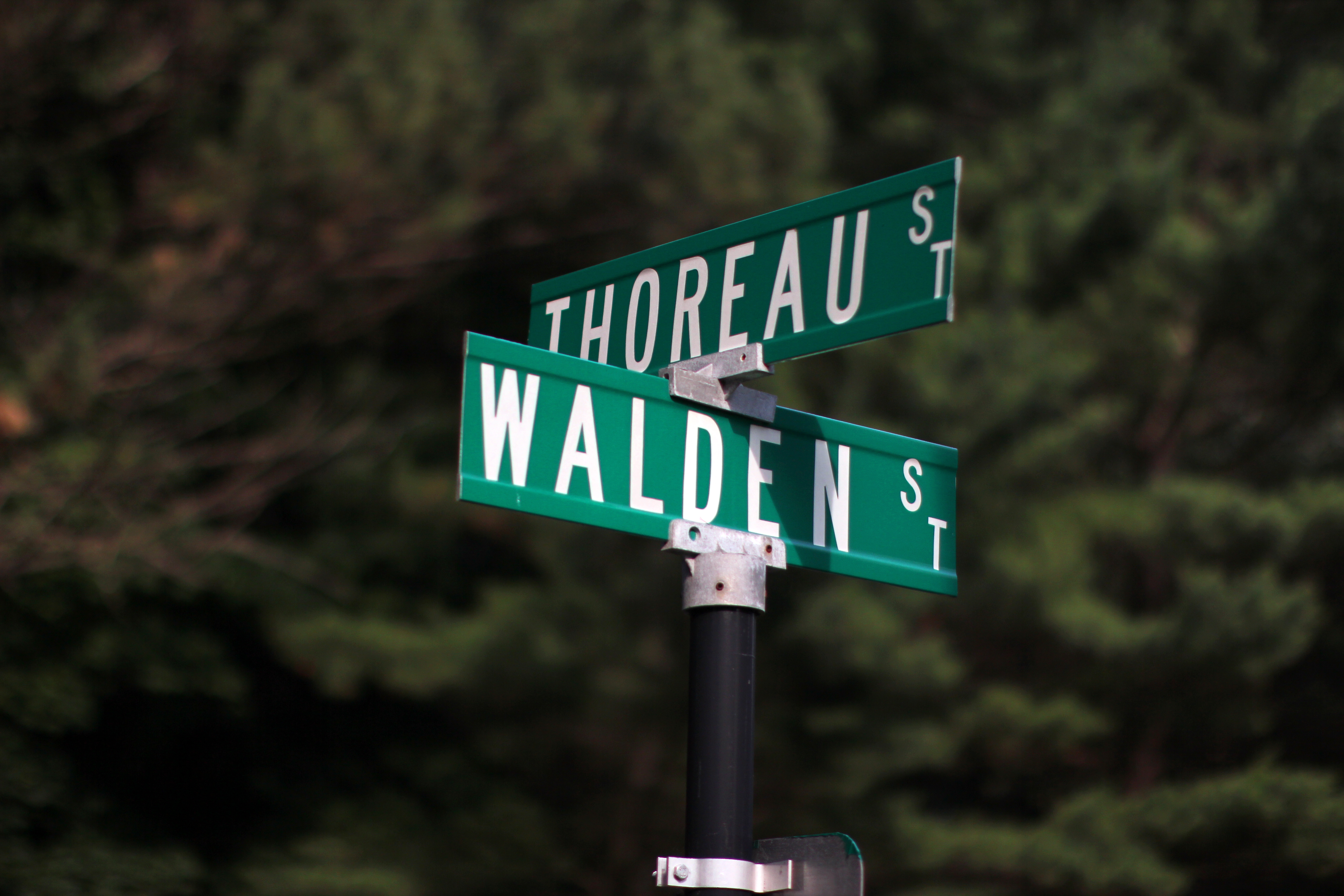
Street names in Concord

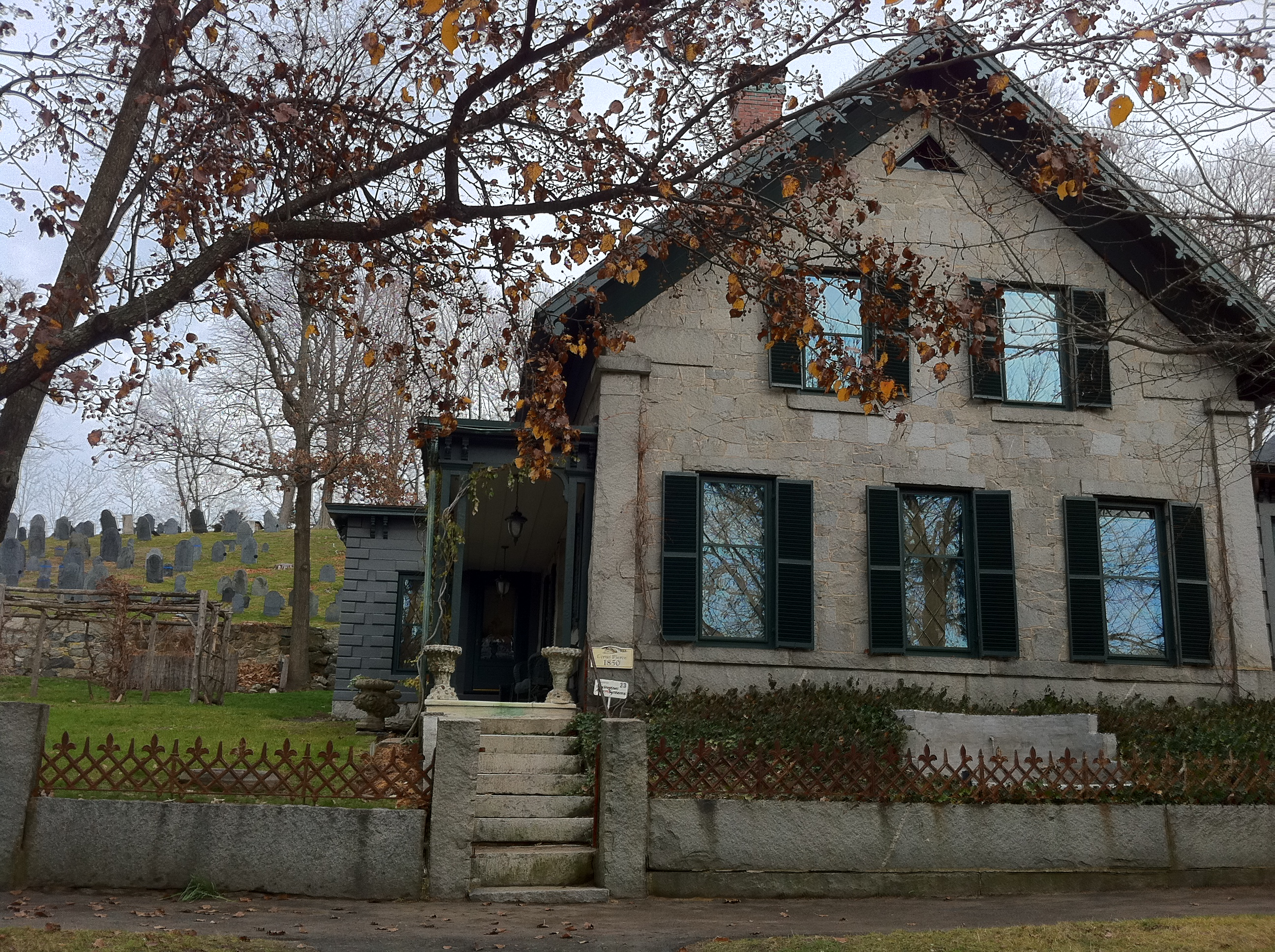
Cyrus Pierce House (23 Lexington Road)

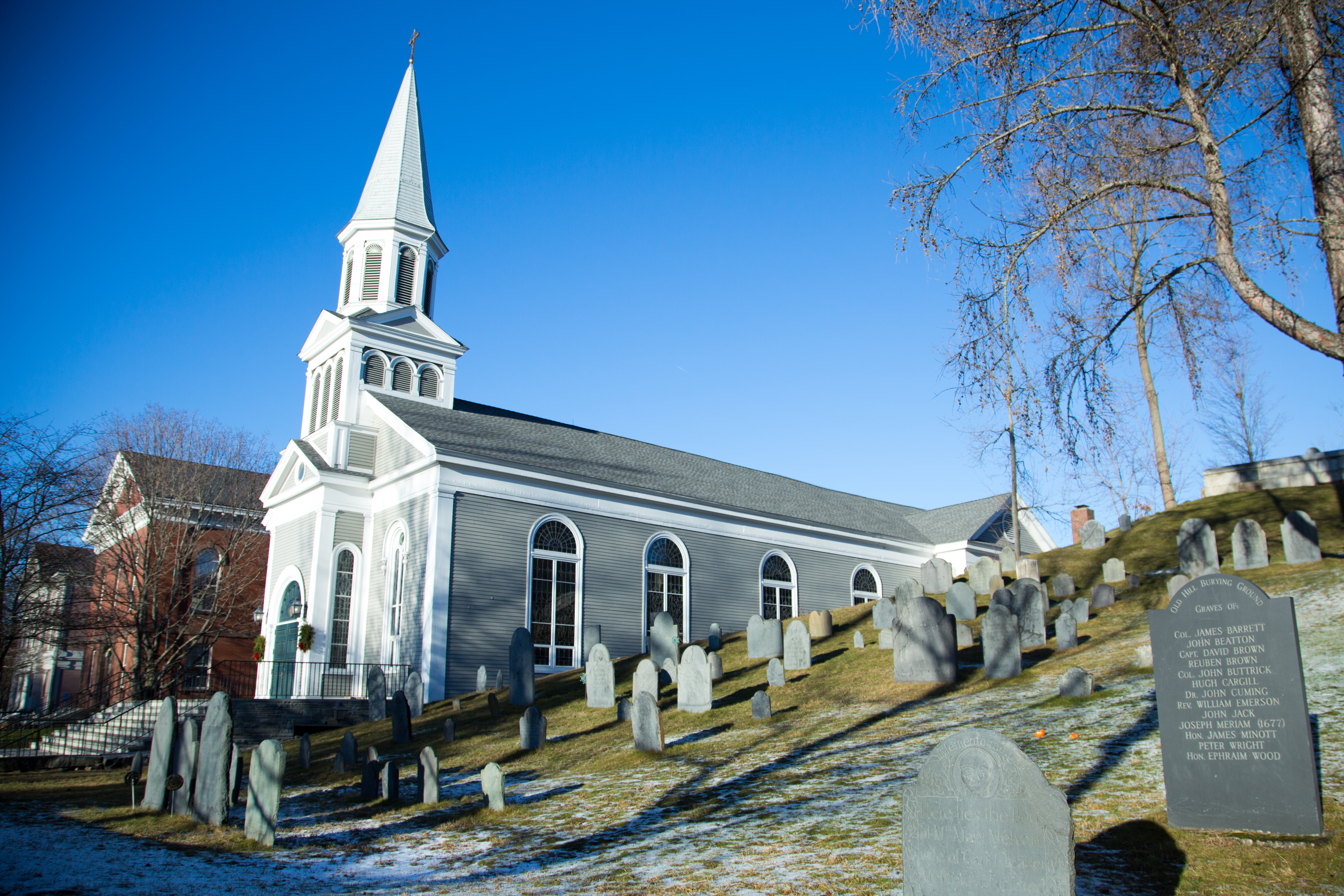
Holy Family Church, and the Old Hill Burying Ground, on Monument Square in Concord

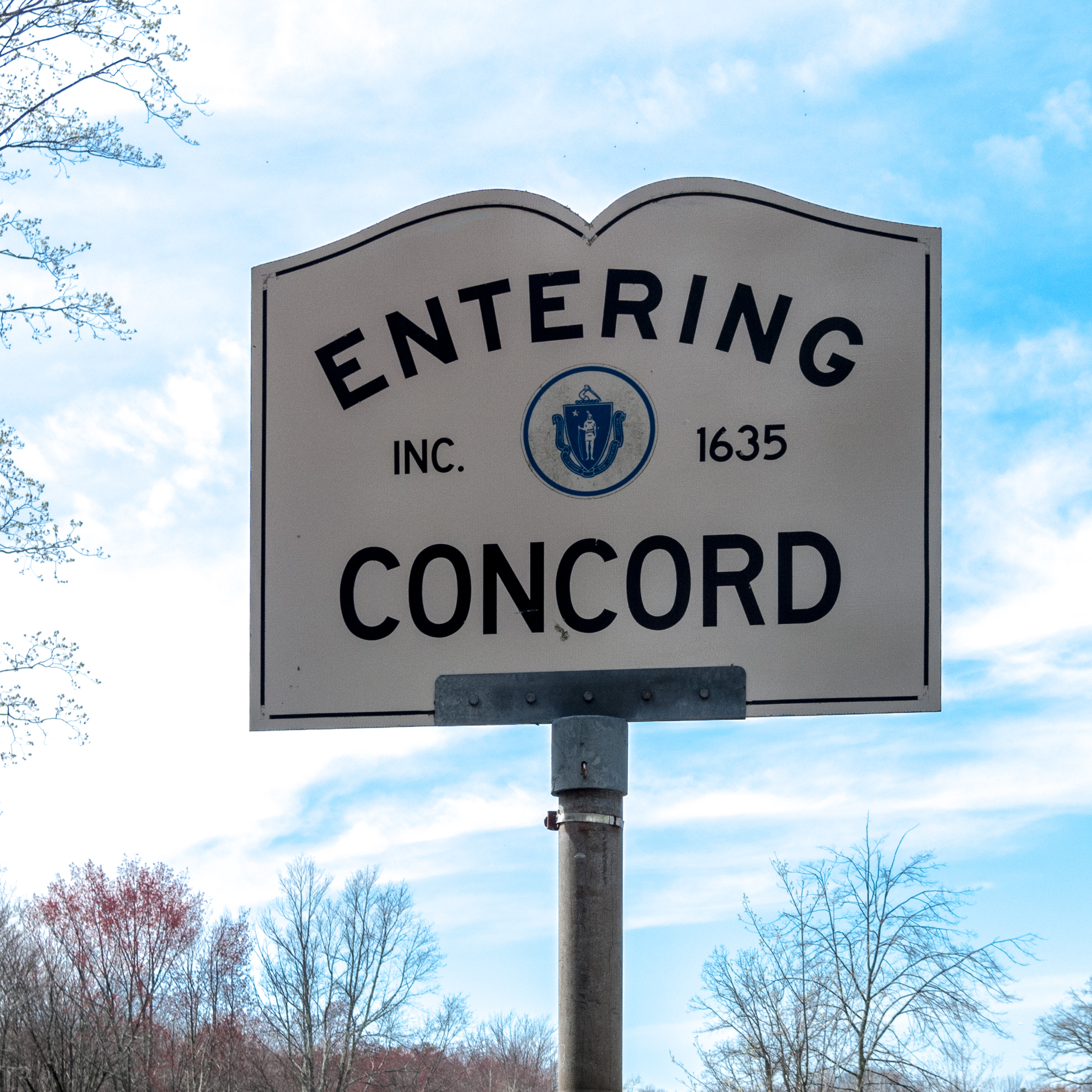
Entering Concord sign, with the year of the town's foundation

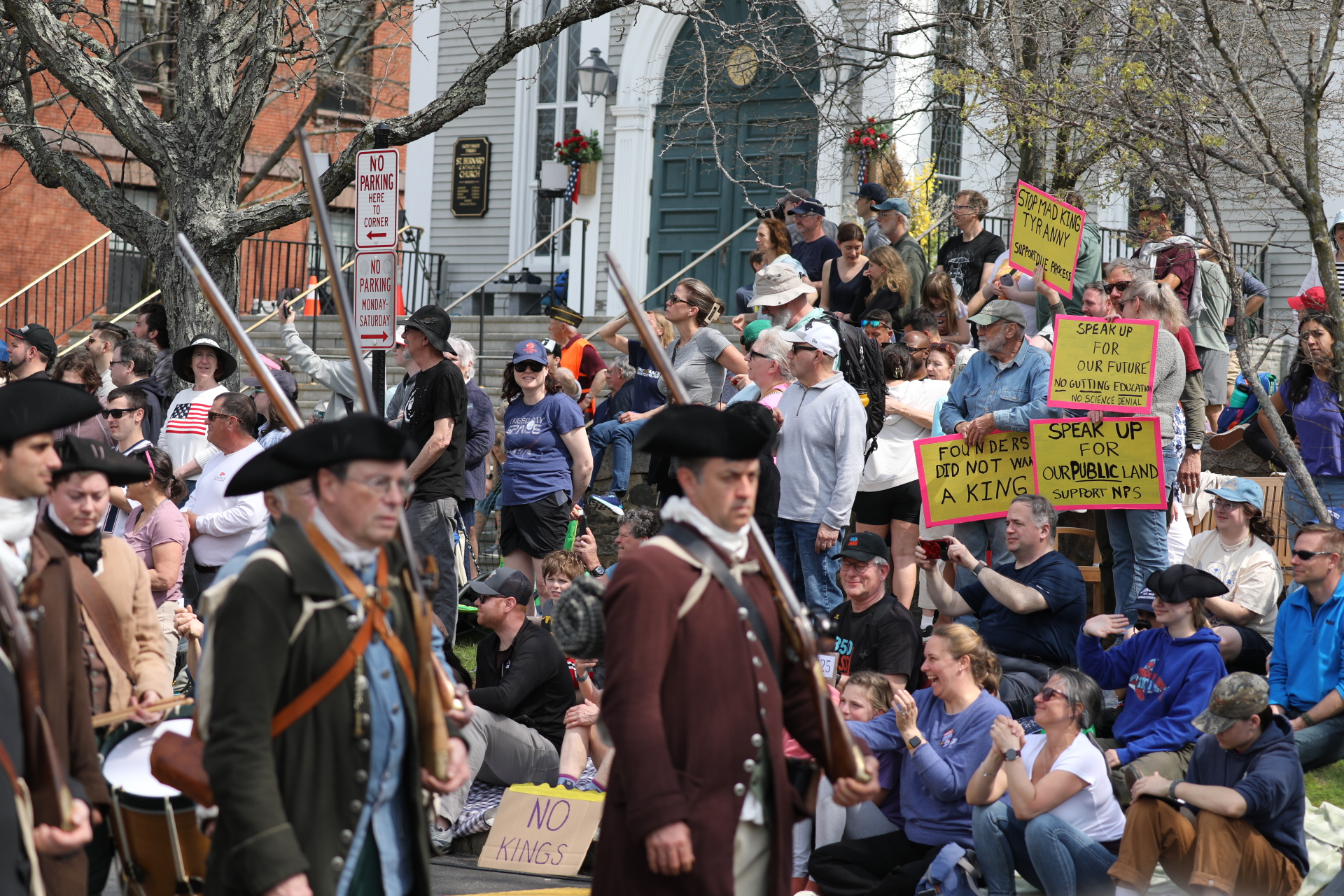
Concord 250, April 19, 2025

== See also ==
- National Register of Historic Places listings in Concord, Massachusetts
- USS Concord, name of five ships
- Verrill Farm
