= Fairyland Pond =

Pond in Concord, Massachusetts

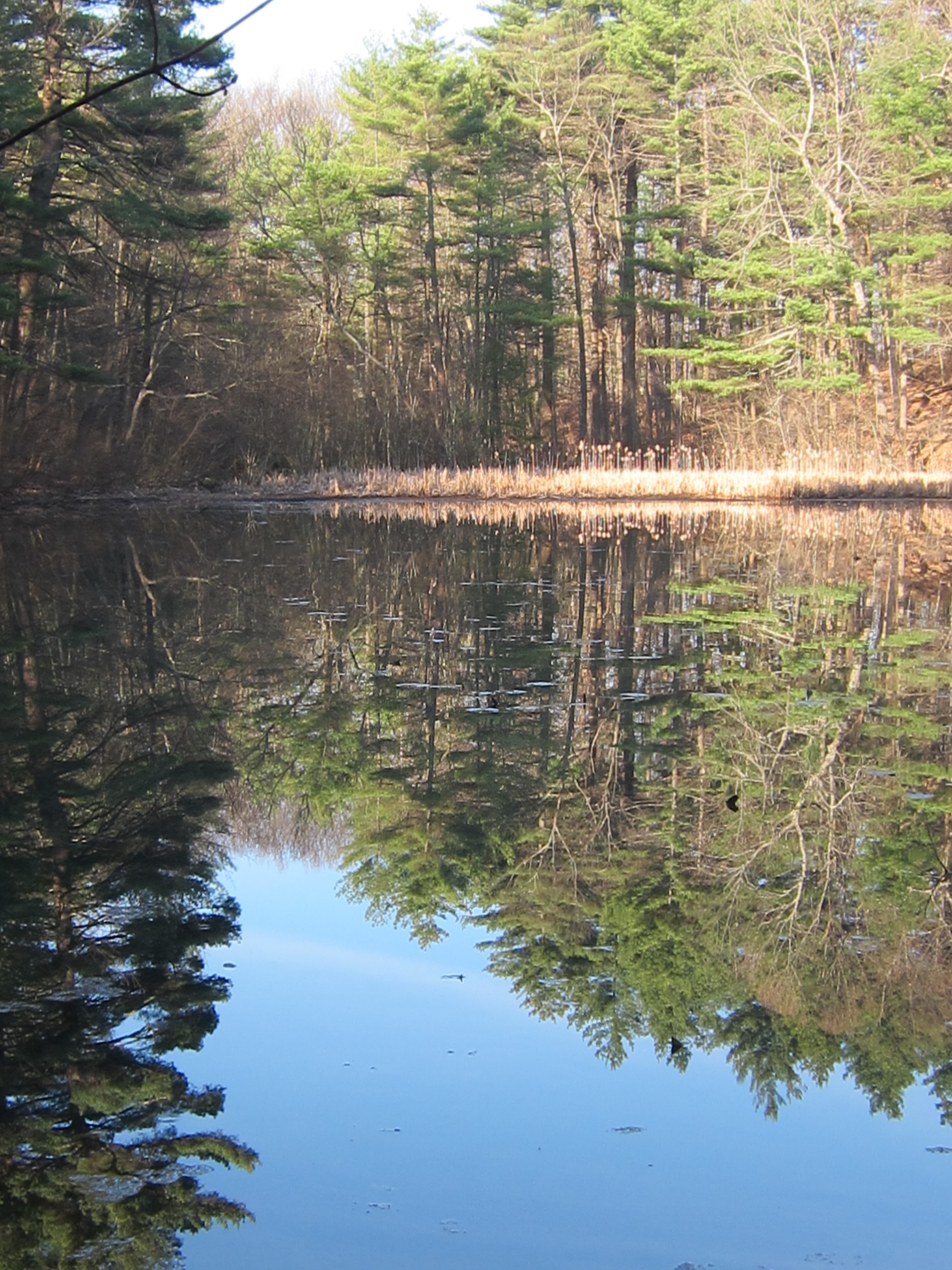
- Fairyland Pond

- Location within Massachusetts Location within the United States
- Location: Hapgood Wright Town Forest, Middlesex County, Massachusetts
- Coordinates: 42.4493°N 71.3403°W
- Type: pond

Fairyland Pond is a pond within Hapgood Wright Town Forest, a conservation area in Concord, Massachusetts. It is a popular recreation area, notable for its old-growth forest and its association with many literary figures from Concord’s past.

== History ==
The area is mentioned in the writings of Ralph Waldo Emerson, Henry David Thoreau and their contemporaries. The name ‘Fairyland’ probably dates to the 1850s and is attributed to Emerson’s children and their companions, including Louisa May Alcott, who lived nearby and often played there.

The Fairyland Pond as it appears today is artificial, having been created in the late 19th century when a dam was constructed. The dam’s drainage culvert was rebuilt in 2011. The inflow to the pond originates about 500 feet to the south at Brister’s Spring, named for Brister Freeman (mistakenly identified by Henry David Thoreau as ‘Scipio’ or ‘Sippio’ Brister), a freed slave who lived with his family on the small hill from which the spring emerges. The location of Brister’s house is now marked as part of the Drinking Gourd Project, which commemorates Concord’s role in the abolitionist movement. The site was considered significant by Emerson, who would sometimes bring visitors to drink a glass of water from the spring.

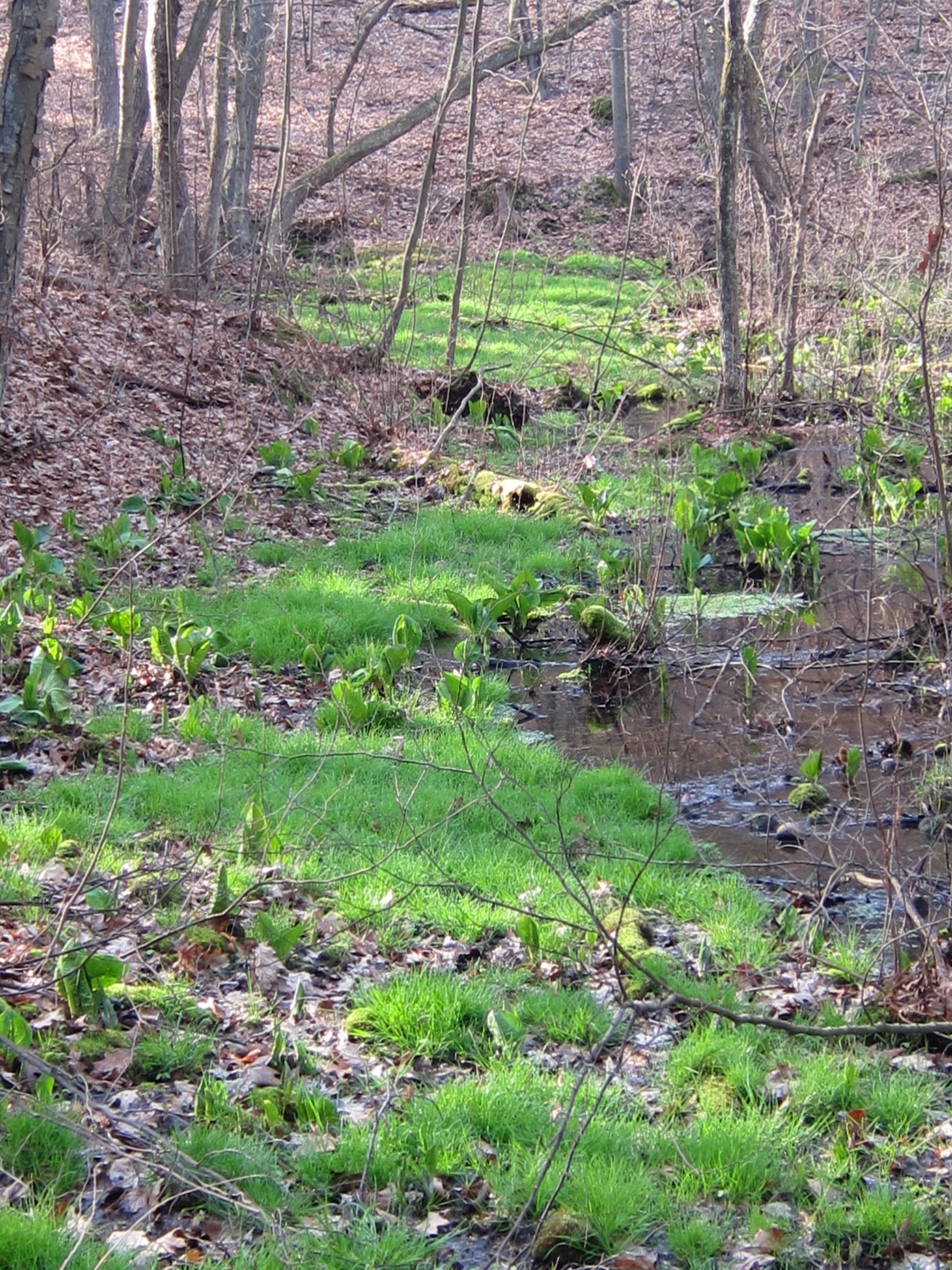
Brister's Spring near Fairyland Pond

== Geography ==
Like the nearby Walden Pond (about half a mile to the south), Fairyland lies within a kettle hole, a depression formed by a retreating glacier. The artificial pond itself covers an area of 2.75 acres. Unlike Walden Pond (which is the deepest lake in Massachusetts), the Fairyland Pond is relatively shallow, with a maximum depth of 4 feet. Its 60-acre watershed is largely undeveloped, lying mostly within the Hapgood Wright conservation area. A certified vernal pool lies immediately to the west of the pond. The surrounding forest is primarily mixed hardwood, hemlock, pine and maple, and the area provides habitat for a diverse range of wildlife.

== Conservation ==
The Fairyland Pond and its surroundings were owned and protected for many years by Emerson’s daughter Edith Emerson Forbes. In 1935 the land was purchased by the town of Concord as the centerpiece of the Hapgood Wright Town Forest, a conservation area which now covers 183 acres. In the 1970s and 1980s the area was threatened by plans for large-scale development, including a proposed cloverleaf interchange between MA Rte 2 and Rte 126 (Walden Street), which would have obliterated Brister’s Spring and destroyed the area’s natural character. In 1984 part of Brister’s Hill was acquired by the prominent real-estate developer Mort Zuckerman, who intended to create a large office park on the site. These plans provoked strong opposition, given the perceived cultural significance of ‘Thoreau country’ in the origin of the environmental movement, and were ultimately defeated through the efforts of local conservation advocates, along with the musician Don Henley (lead singer of The Eagles), who donated funds and mobilized political and celebrity support (including a visit by President Clinton ) to acquire and preserve the threatened site as part of the Walden Woods Project.

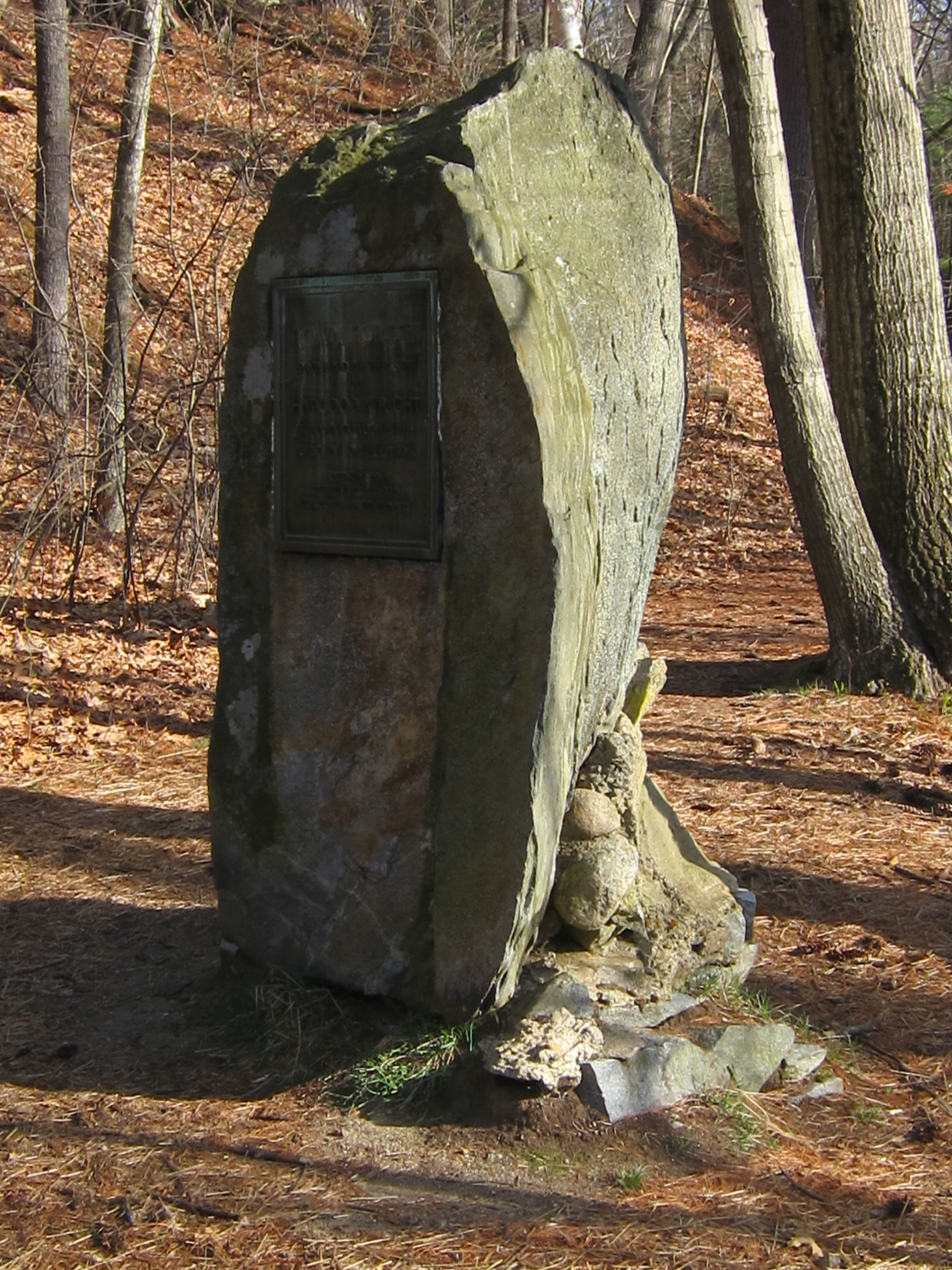
Hapgood Wright monument at Fairyland Pond

== Access ==
The Fairyland Pond lies on the Bay Circuit Trail, and is accessible by foot from the small parking lot on Walden Street opposite the entrance to the Concord-Carlisle High School. There is also a handicapped parking lot close to the Brister house site.
