= Concord Armory =

- U.S. National Register of Historic Places
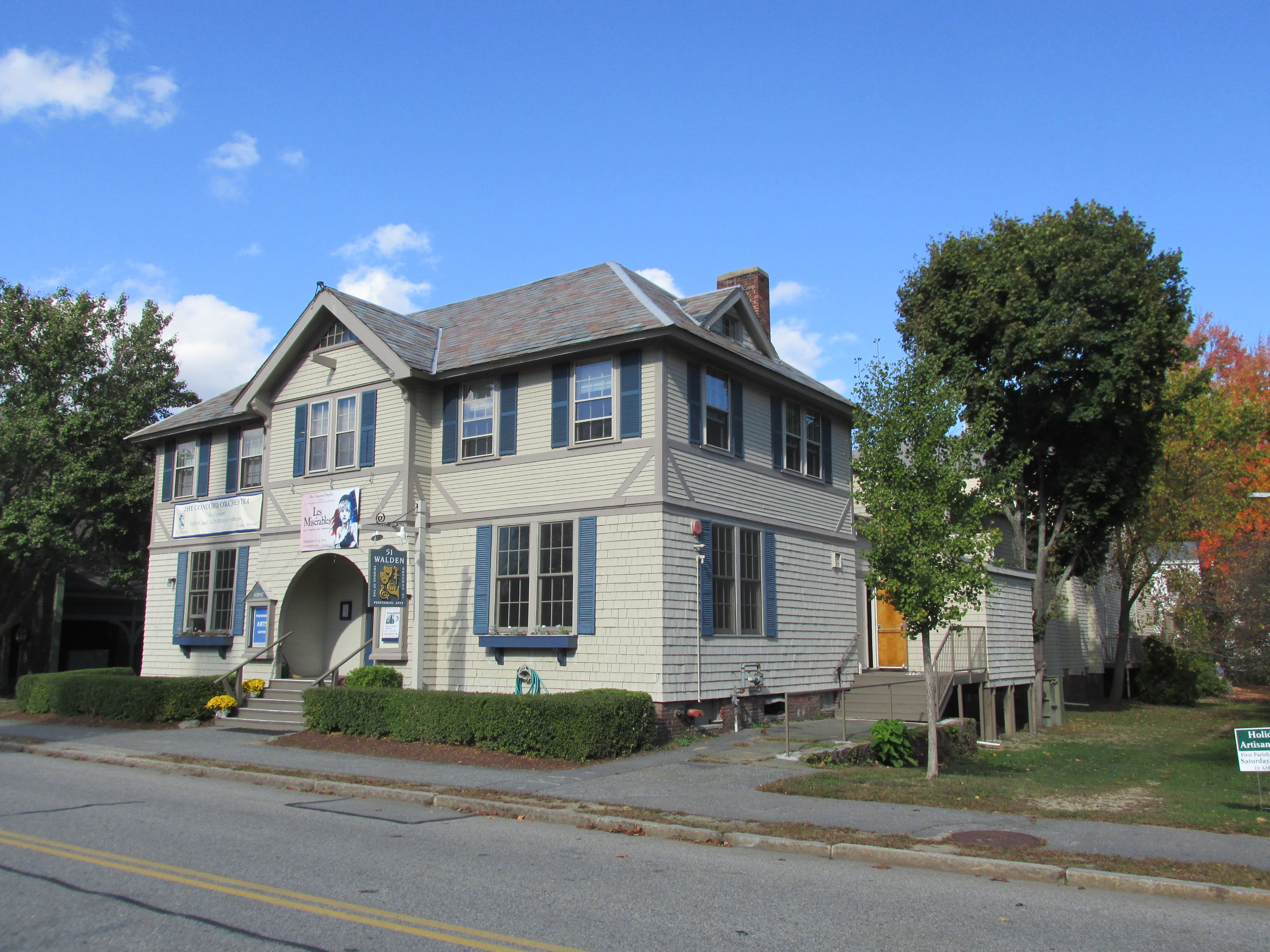
- Historic Concord Armory, now the Performing Arts Center at 51 Walden

- Location within Massachusetts Location within the United States
- Location: Concord, Massachusetts
- Coordinates: 42°27′32″N 71°20′58″W
- Area: less than one acre
- Built: 1887
- Architect: Chapman, John; Blackwell, Clarence; Little, Harry
- Architectural style: Queen Anne
- NRHP reference No.: 07000945
- Added to NRHP: September 12, 2007

The Concord Armory is an historic former armory at 51 Walden Street in Concord, Massachusetts. It now serves as the Performing Arts Center at 51 Walden, which is operated by the Friends of Performing Arts in Concord (FOPAC). Resident groups include The Concord Players, The Concord Band, and The Concord Orchestra. The armory was built in 1887 and added to the National Register of Historic Places in 2007, as a rare well-preserved example of a wood-frame municipal armory.

The armory was built in several stages, between 1887 and 1927. The front portion, or headhouse, was built in 1887, and the drill shed added in 1888. In 1896 the drill shed was lengthened. When the building was converted for use by veterans organizations and the Concord Players in the 1920s, the area housing the stage was added, to a design drawn up by the noted theater architect Clarence Blackall. In 1927 the stage area was extended to the rear to provide additional space for scenery. The building interior was extensively altered in the 1970s when FOPAC took over the property.

The lower level of the head house now serves as a lobby area, which also extends into the former drill shed; its upper level serves as a dance studio. The drill shed has been converted into a theatrical auditorium, with its original ceiling trusses exposed, and acoustic treatments on the walls. The basement houses storage space and dressing rooms.

Historical uses of the building during the 20th century include the screening of films by the Red Cross in the 1920s, and for annual town meetings between 1933 and 1946. It was also used to house town offices, and to provide space for a youth center. Due to its deteriorating condition, the building was several times considered for demolition in the 1950s and 1960s, but public outcry was successful in preventing that fate. FOPAC was formed in 1972 to convert the building into a dedicated performing arts space.

== See also ==
- National Register of Historic Places listings in Concord, Massachusetts
