= Emerson Hospital =

Hospital in Concord, Massachusetts

- Emerson Health
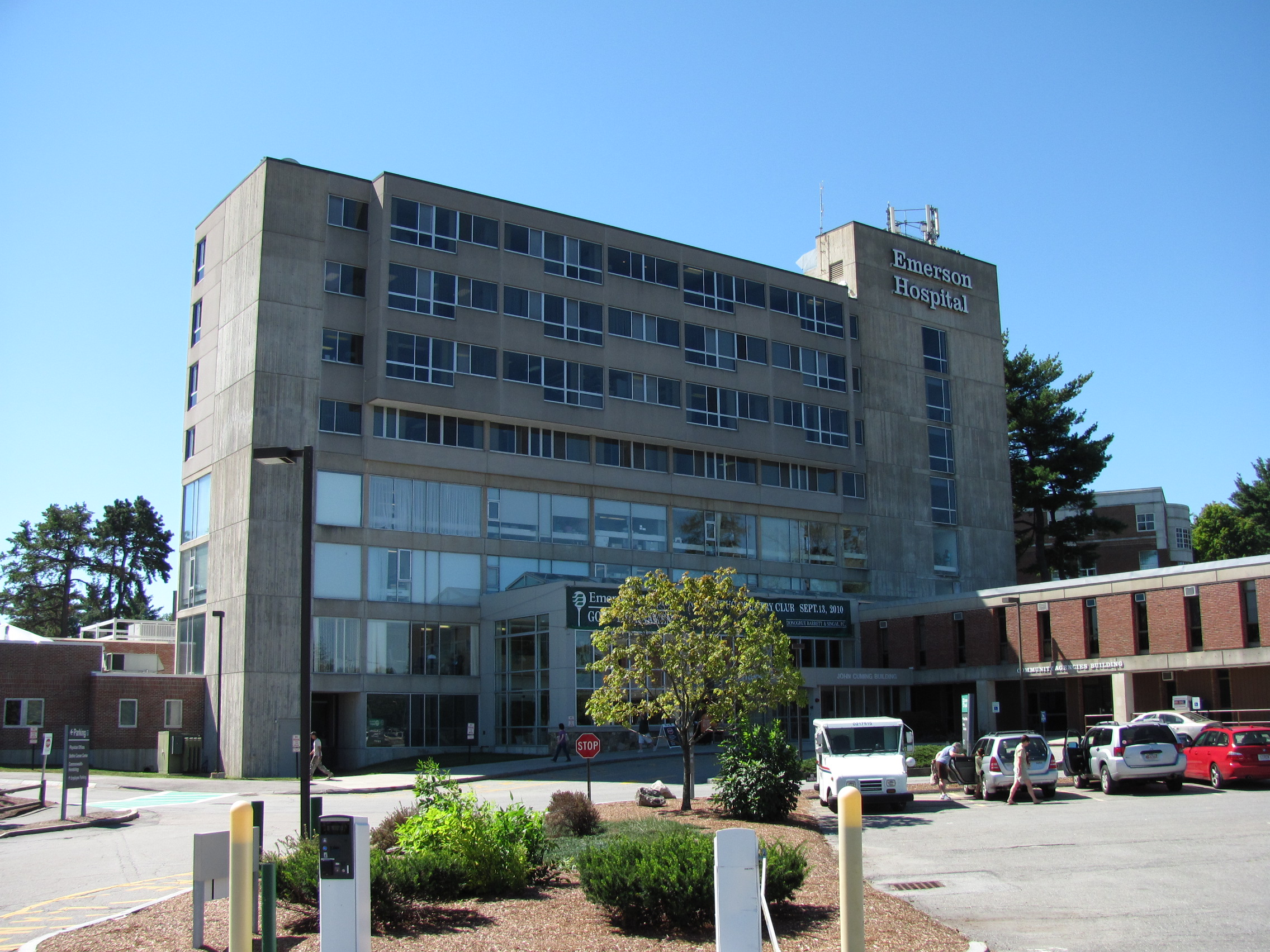
- Emerson Hospital, John Cuming Building

Geography
- Location: Concord, Massachusetts, United States
- Coordinates: 42°27′07.52″N 71°22′29.38″W

Organization
- Type: Community

Services
- Standards: Joint Commission
- Emergency department: Yes
- Beds: 179

Helipads
- Helipad: (ICAO: US-5209)

History
- Former name: Concord Deaconess Hospital
- Opened: 1911

Links
- Lists: Hospitals in Massachusetts

Emerson Hospital is a hospital located in Concord, Massachusetts. It was founded in 1911 on 40 acres (16 ha) donated by Charles Emerson, a nephew of Ralph Waldo Emerson. It is a full-service, nonprofit community hospital and acute care medical center with 179 beds (as of 2023), providing advanced medical services to more than 300,000 individuals in 25 towns.

== History ==
Charles Emerson donated 80 acres of land and $20,000 to found Concord Deaconess Hospital on December 18, 1910, one week after the death of his wife, who had sought treatment at the Deaconess Hospital in Boston. Emerson made his donation to the New England Deaconess Association, which ran its clinical facilities on a charitable basis and provided medical care at no cost for a limited number of patients unable to pay.

When the Concord Deaconess Hospital opened its doors on November 12, 1911, it had 14 beds. The first birth at the hospital take place on February 29, 1912. The original hospital building was two stories tall with a basement and constructed in the Colonial style with a gambrel roof, terracotta tiles, and concrete facing. "Upon entering the main hall," observed an article in The Concord Observer, "one’s eye is instantly attracted by a picture on the wall at the right. This picture, which is of Mrs. Charles Emerson, the gift of Mr. Emerson, is a painting by William James, son of the late Prof. James of Harvard."

In 1924, facing financial difficulties, the Deaconess Association voted to close the hospital in Concord. Residents rallied to save the hospital, raising $90,000 and enabling the hospital to reincorporate as Emerson Hospital and under the governance of a board of trustees drawn from the Emerson Hospital Association. The hospital reopened in November. The first admission was an eight-year-old boy with appendicitis.

In 1934, "the rates for a bed on the ward were billed at $3.50 per day, with the cost of a private room increasing to $4.25. Rates for maternity were greater, ranging from $4.00 to $6.50 for a private room per day. The hospital charged $10.00 for the delivery of a baby. Charges for use of the operating room were $5.00 plus $5.00 for anesthesia for minor cases and $10.00 plus $5.00 for anesthesia for major surgical cases. The removal of tonsils cost $9.50 while any treatment requiring the use of dressings ranged in fees from $2.00 to $5.00. Even at these rates, many patients could not afford the services they received while a patient at Emerson. The laboratory charged fees ranging from $1.00 to $5.00."

In 1962, actor and comedian Steve Carell was born in Emerson Hospital.

In 1982, the Board of Directors voted to create a parent corporation, Emerson Health System Inc. As the Chairman of the Board wrote in the 1982 annual report, the new corporation was “to provide a conceptual framework for development of a more comprehensive health system and a legal structure in which small, potentially revenue producing corporations could be formed free from state-regulated budget constraints.” Emerson Health System Inc. is a not-for-profit corporation organized under Massachusetts law and is tax exempt under the Internal Revenue Code Section 501(c)(3). Emerson Health System Inc. is the sole member of Emerson Hospital and elects the Board of Directors of the Hospital. Emerson Hospital is also a not-for-profit corporation."

In 2024, Emerson Hospital removed the name of 18th-century Concord physician John Cuming from its medical office building, citing Cuming's enslavement of two Black men. In 2026, the hospital demolished the White House, a historic farmhouse that once served as a nurses' dormitory and was being used as office space, planning to construct a new building for the emergency department on the house's footprint. The demolition of the White House was an opening salvo of a $100 million campus renovation.

== Clinical affiliations ==
- Massachusetts General Hospital: Radiation Oncology, Genetic counseling through MGH's Center for Cancer Risk Assessment, Pediatric affiliations in Neonatology and Pediatric Subspecialties including Gastroenterology and Cardiology
- Dana-Farber Cancer Institute: Collaborative program for cancer care, including clinical trials
- Brigham and Women's Hospital: Gynecological Oncology
- Beth Israel Deaconess Medical Center: Perinatology
- Reproductive Science Center: Infertility
