= Concord Players =

American theatre company founded in 1919

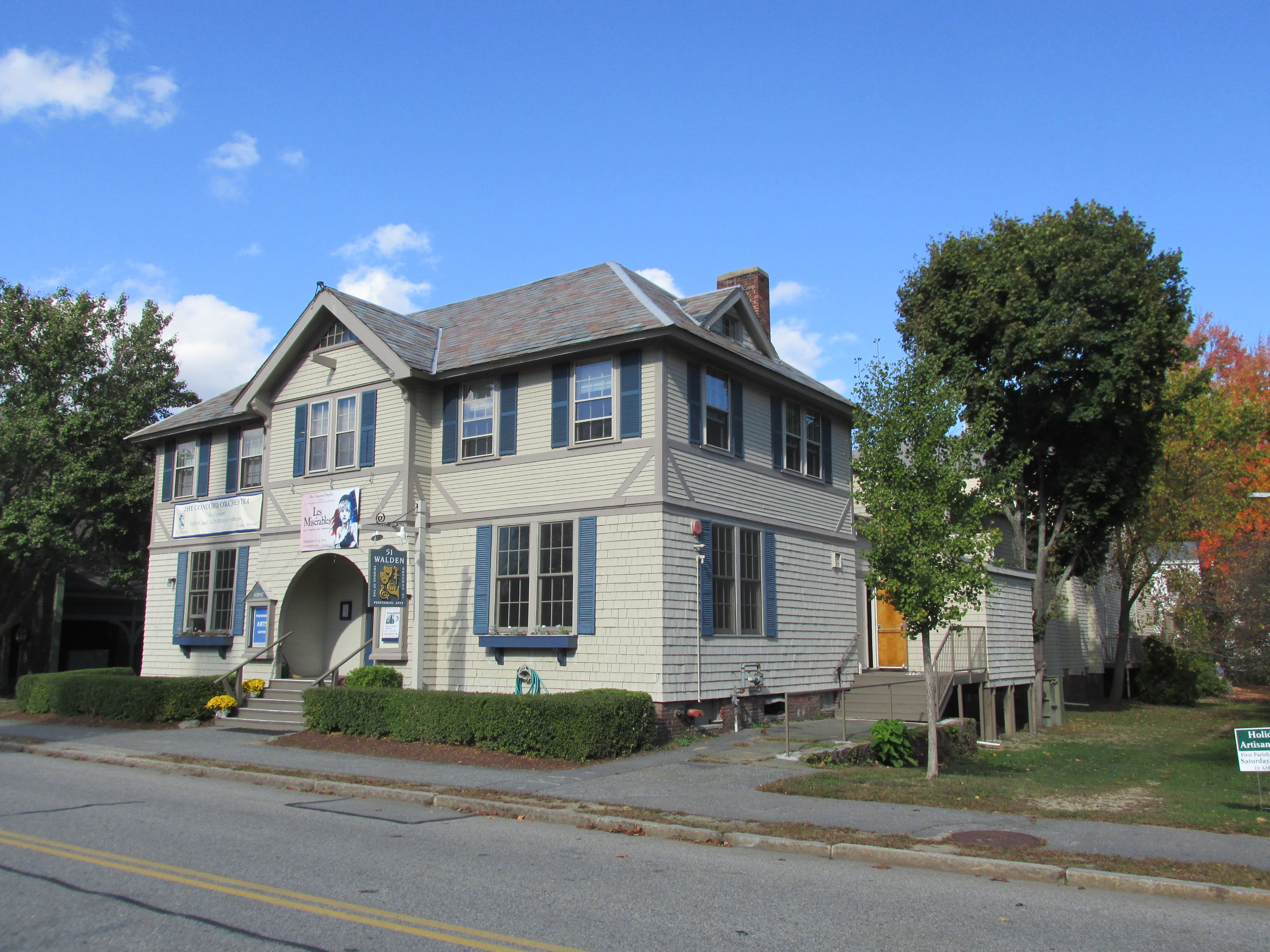
- The Concord Armory as of 2013; it has been the home of the Concord Players since 1922
- Formation: 1919; 107 years ago
- Founder: Samuel Merwin
- Type: Theatre company
- Legal status: 501(c)(3) nonprofit
- Headquarters: Concord Armory
- Location: Concord, Massachusetts, United States
- Executive Director: Carole Wayland
- Website: concordplayers.org
- Formerly called: Concord Dramatic Union; Concord Dramatic Club

The Concord Players are an American amateur theatre company based in Concord, Massachusetts. Established in 1919, the company traces its origins to 1856, when Louisa May Alcott helped found the Concord Dramatic Union.

== History ==
The Concord Players formed in 1919 under the leadership of Samuel Merwin. Its predecessors were the Concord Dramatic Club (founded in 1872) and the Concord Dramatic Union (founded by Louisa May and Anna Alcott in 1856). The first Concord Players production was Fame and the Poet, which premiered on November 28, 1919. They performed at Monument Hall or Town Hall before moving into the town armory and first performing on this new stage on November 16, 1922. The Concord Armory is now a performing arts center called 51 Walden Street, home not only to the Concord Players but also to the Concord Band, the Concord Orchestra, and dance classes.

The Players are three-time winners of the New England Theatre Conference (NETC) Moss Hart Award and five-time winners of the Eastern Massachusetts Association of Community Theaters Festivals. They have staged an adaptation of Louisa May Alcott’s Little Women every ten years since 1932. In 1971, they held the New England premiere of The Night Thoreau Spent in Jail by Robert E. Lee and Jerome Lawrence.
