= Estabrook Woods =

Protected area in Massachusetts, US

Coordinates: 42.4956°N 71.3538°W

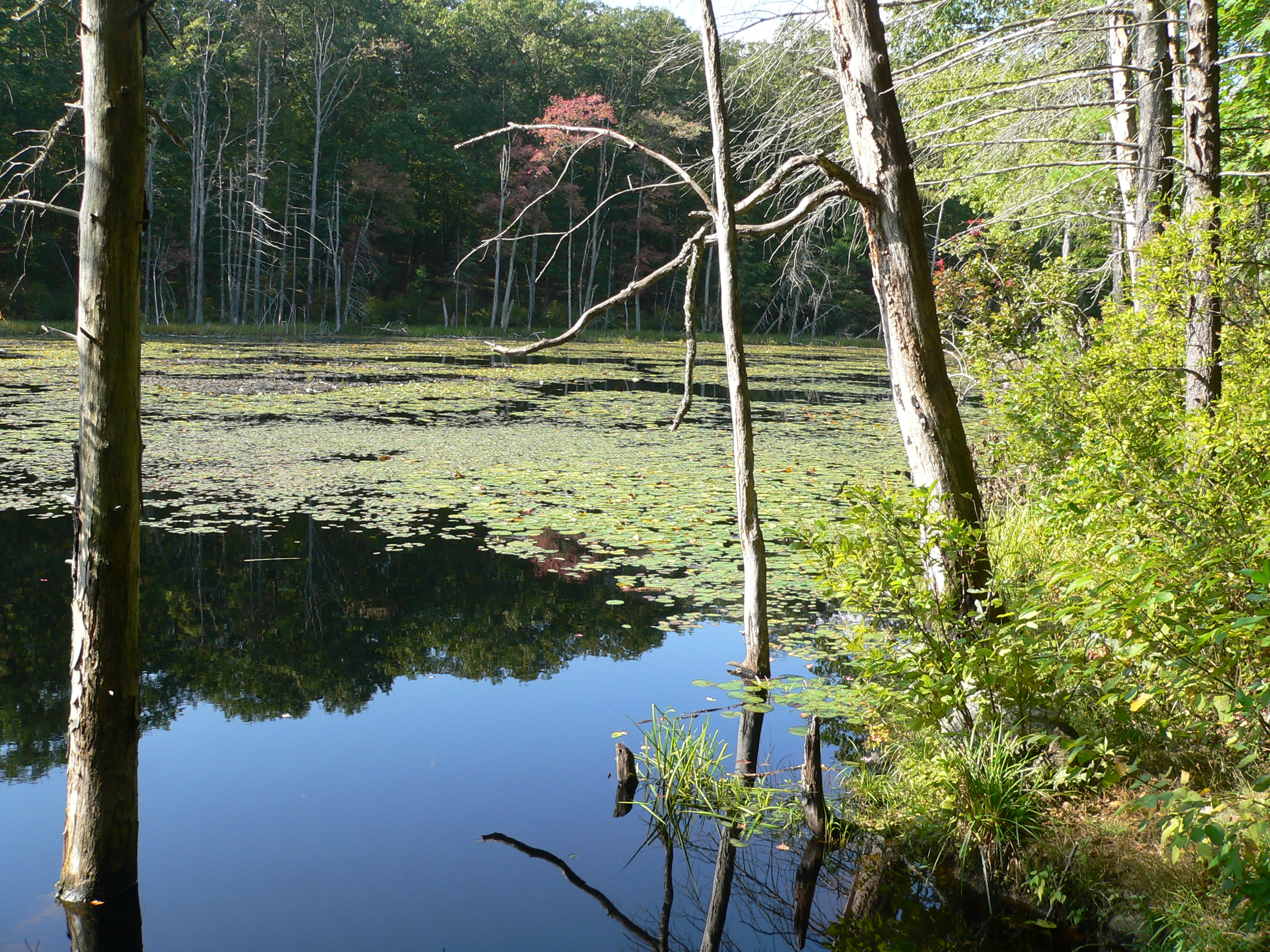
Estabrook Woods pond

The Estabrook Woods is a wild tract of more than 1,700 acres (6.9 km^{2}) of woodland, hills, ledge, and swamp straddling Concord and Carlisle Massachusetts, two miles (3 km) north of the center of Town of Concord. It is the largest contiguous and undeveloped woodland within thirty miles of Boston. However, the woods have a history of human disturbance dating back to the Algonquian Native Americans who used controlled burning to clear tracts of land. Later, colonists cleared much of Estabrook for agriculture and pastures, although vegetation has since rejuvenated. The Woods are named for the Thomas Estabrook family, prominent in the area since colonial times.

Henry David Thoreau is intimately associated with this area, which he called "Easterbrooks Country". In his Oct. 20, 1857 journal entry, one of several on the woodland, he writes: “What a wild and rich domain that Easterbrooks Country! Not a cultivated, hardly a cultivatable field in it, and yet it delights all natural persons.”

During the early 20th century, a small number of Concord families began to acquire the land in Estabrook Woods. In 1932, they successfully petitioned the town to close and discontinue the old logging trail known as Old Estabrook Road, ensuring it would be protected from residential development. Around 1965, these families, along with Harvard and Middlesex School, began working together to create a nature preserve, establishing Harvard's Concord Field Station and placing major restrictions on development of many remaining private lands. In 1996, Concord and Carlisle worked together on the "Campaign for Estabrook Woods" which placed an additional 400 acres into conservation.

The Woods are located just north of the historic North Bridge, site of the famous 1775 battle of the American Revolutionary War. Since the 1970s, the Woods have been used each April 19 as a route to reenact the march of the northern Minute Men to the North Bridge. However, the actual route was via Lowell Rd located just west of the Woods.

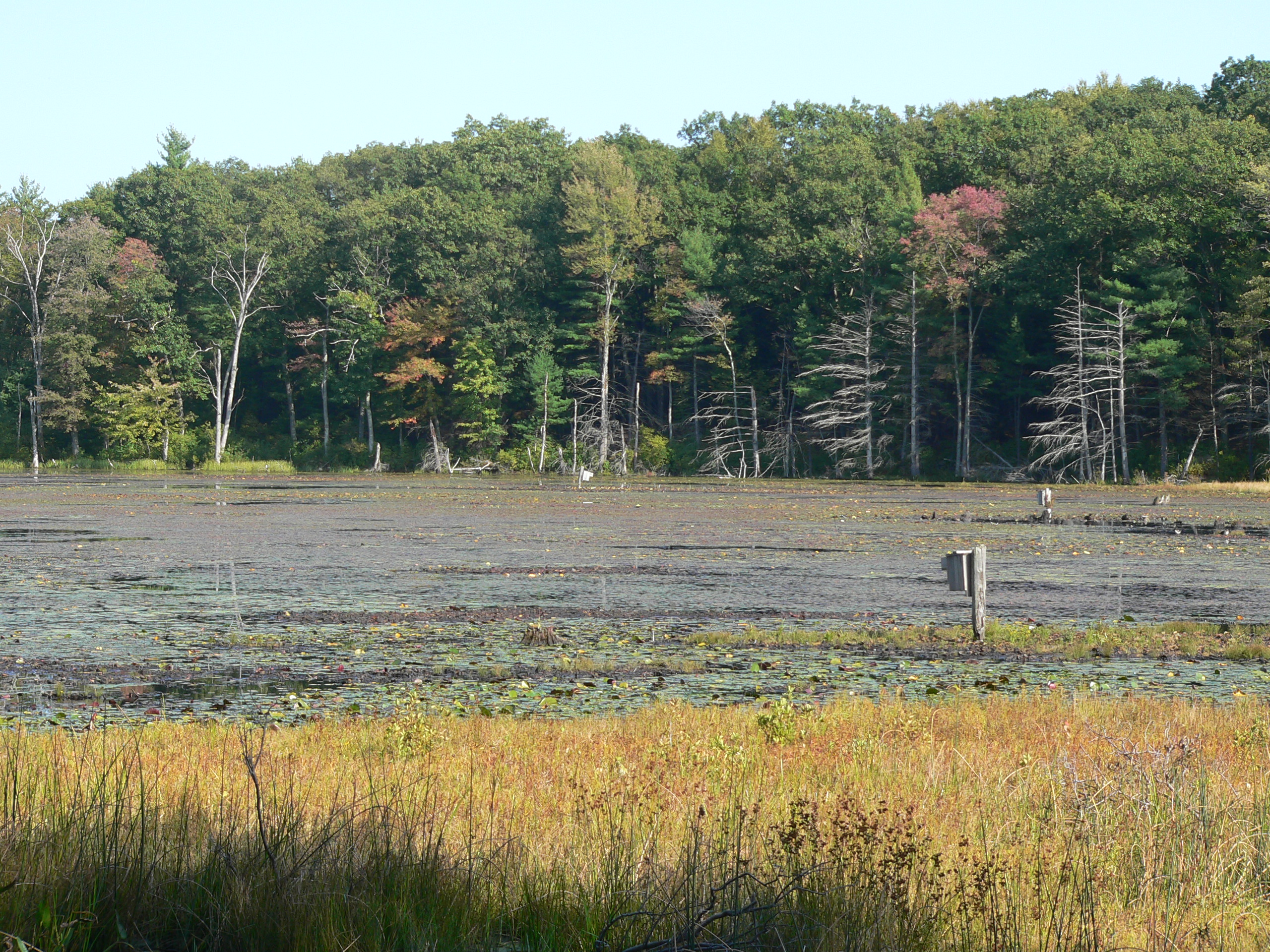
Estabrook Woods wetlands

Estabrook Woods has significant ecological significance to the area.

- It provides habitats for five state-listed endangered species: A globally-endangered dragonfly and four Species of Special Concern: the Blue Spotted Salamander, the Elderberry Long horned Beetle, the Spotted Turtle, and the Mystic Valley Amphipod. The woods are also a breeding site of at least three watch list species: the Spotted Salamander, Northern Leopard Frog, and Northern Goshawk.
- Estabrook Woods is home to over 159 different species of bird, six species of thrush, four species of owl and ten of hawk.
- In 1993 The U.S Secretary of Agriculture Alphonso Michael Espy, honored the entire Estabrook Woods by formally designating it a Forest Legacy Area under an Act of Congress for its environmental values, the presence of rare and endangered species and archeological and historic resources.
- In October, 2001, The Massachusetts Office of Environmental Affairs designated the Estabrook Woods as 'core habitat' whose preservation is needed to protect biodiversity.

The Estabrook Woods are bordered by Lowell Road to the west, Monument Street to the east, and Bedford Road (Rt. 225) to the north.

Most of Estabrook Woods is privately owned—by Harvard University (672 acres), Middlesex School (180 acres), and a number of smaller landowners, who manage it cooperatively as a nature preserve. Trail and Parking maps are available for the portions owned by the Town of Concord (115 acres), and the Town of Carlisle (188 acres). Approximately half the Woods has trails open to the public, mostly by permission of the owners, subject to posted rules.

== Access Controversy ==
Estabrook Trail traverses private property in Estabrook Woods, connecting Estabrook Road in Concord to Estabrook Road in Carlisle. In April 2017, the owners of the southern half mile of Estabrook Trail posted a sign indicating that the trail was temporarily closed due to a series of Coyote attacks on dogs. The Town of Concord disputed the owners’ rights to close or regulate the trail and in November 2017 sued for access to the private road. Current and prior owners relied on a 1932 Order of Discontinuance, under an old law, which made them the owners of the road. In November 2022, the Land Court held that 1932 discontinuance established a privately owned way with a public easement for travel. This landmark ruling affects the status of all such discontinued roads around the State. The Defendants filed a Notice of Appeal in December 2022. In August 2025, the Massachusetts Supreme Judicial Court upheld the decision of the Land Court as modified by the Appeals Court, finding that the 1932 discontinuance only terminated the public obligation to maintain the road but did not terminate the public's right of access.
