= List of people from Lexington =

This is a list of notable people from Lexington, Massachusetts. It includes people who were born or raised in, lived in, or spent significant portions of their lives in Lexington, or for whom Lexington is a significant part of their identity. This list is in order by primary field of notability and then in alphabetical order by last name.

== Athletes ==
=== Baseball ===
- Mary Dailey (1928–1965), All-American Girls Professional Baseball League player
- Carlton Fisk, Hall of Fame catcher for Boston Red Sox and Chicago White Sox
- Sal Frelick, Professional baseball outfielder for the Milwaukee Brewers

=== Basketball ===
- Dane DiLiegro, professional basketball player
- Dennis Johnson, guard for the Boston Celtics
- Luke Kornet, center for the Boston Celtics
- Rollie Massimino, led Villanova Wildcats to basketball national championship in 1985, former Lexington High School teacher and coach
- Matt Reynolds, assistant coach for the Boston Celtics
- Derrick White, guard for the Boston Celtics

=== eSports ===
- Rumay "Hafu" Wang, eSports player

=== Figure skating ===
- Aimee Buchanan (born 1993), American-born Olympic figure skater for Israel

=== Football ===
- Dave DeGuglielmo, U.S. football coach

=== Hockey ===
- Claude Julien, former head coach for the Boston Bruins
- Steve Leach, former NHL player
- Will Smith, center for the San Jose Sharks

=== Mountaineering ===
- Bradford Washburn (1910–2007), mountaineer
- Barbara Washburn (1914–2014), first woman to summit Denali

=== Soccer ===
- Robbie Mustoe, former English Footballer, current ESPN analyst

== Artists and designers ==
=== Architects ===
- Jean B. Fletcher & Norman C. Fletcher, founders of The Architects Collaborative in Cambridge, Massachusetts with Bauhaus veteran Walter Gropius
- John C. Harkness & Sarah P. Harkness, founders of The Architects Collaborative
- Robert S. McMillan founder of The Architects Collaborative
- Louis A. McMillen founder of The Architects Collaborative
- Walter Pierce, modernist architect, whose work included the Peacock Farm development in Lexington
- Ben Thompson, founder of The Architects Collaborative and Design Research store
- Hugh Stubbins, designer and owner of Lexington's first modernist house

=== Artists ===
- Harold Dow Bugbee, Western artist
- Rachel Dratch, cast member of Saturday Night Live
- Scott McCloud, cartoonist
- Hermann Dudley Murphy early twentieth-century still-life and landscape painter
- Scott Oberholtzer animator on South Park

=== Fashion ===
- Ryan Jude Novelline, contemporary artist and fashion designer

== Crime ==
- Charles Ponzi, con man, bought mansion in Lexington during 1920 (see Ponzi scheme)
- Aafia Siddiqui, neuroscientist convicted of assaulting with a deadly weapon and attempting to kill U.S. soldiers and FBI agents (alleged Al-Qaeda operative)

== Entertainment industry ==
=== Actors ===
- G. Hannelius, child actress
- Dionne Quan, voice actress
- Dane DiLiegro, actor

=== Comedians ===
- Orny Adams, comedian
- Pete Holmes, comedian
- Mehran Khaghani, comedian
- Eugene Mirman, comedian
- Rachel Dratch, comedian

== Television figures ==
- Russell Morash, pioneer of 'how-to' television, creator and producer of the PBS shows "The Victory Garden," "This Old House," and "New Yankee Workshop"
- Tom Silva, building contractor and co-host of the PBS show This Old House
- Ethan Zohn, winner of Survivor: Africa

== Military ==
- Sidney Burbank, officer in the U.S. Army during the American Civil War
- John Parker, captain of the Lexington militia at the Battles of Lexington & Concord
- William Munroe IV, sergeant of the Lexington militia at the Battles of Lexington & Concord, owner of Munroe Tavern

== Musicians and bands ==
- Francis Judd Cooke, composer
- Alan Dawson (1929–1996), famous jazz drummer and percussion teacher
- Brad Ellis, composer and pianist appearing on the television show Glee (TV Series)
- Steven Feifke, Grammy-winning jazz pianist and composer
- John Flansburgh, one half of alternative rock duo They Might Be Giants
- Bill Janovitz, lead singer and guitarist of the rock and roll band Buffalo Tom
- Jon Landau, music critic and former manager for Bruce Springsteen
- George Li, concert pianist
- Andrew McMahon, musician, lead vocalist and songwriter of Jack's Mannequin and Something Corporate
- Matt Nathanson, musician
- Amanda Palmer, songwriter, vocalist, pianist of the duo The Dresden Dolls

== News and commentary ==
- Joyce Kulhawik, arts and entertainment anchor for WBZ-TV news
- Bill Lichtenstein, Peabody Award-winning journalist, filmmaker, radio producer

== Political figures, activists and civil servants ==
- Francis B. Hayes, lawyer, businessman, and state senator
- Charles Hudson, Whig Congressman and antiquarian
- Bill McKibben, environmentalist
- William Munroe I, early settler of Lexington
- Peter Orszag, economist, Director of the Office of Management and Budget
- George D. Robinson, Governor of Massachusetts
- Jill Stein, Green Party presidential candidate in 2012, 2016, and 2024

== Religious leaders ==
- Jonas Clarke, patriot minister of Lexington during the American Revolution, occupant of Hancock–Clarke House
- Charles Follen, abolitionist and minister of Follen Church
- Dana Greeley, last president of the American Unitarian Association and first president of the Unitarian Universalist Association
- Reverend John Hancock, minister of Lexington, occupant of Hancock–Clarke House
- Theodore Parker, Unitarian minister and Transcendentalist
- Clarence Skinner, Dean of Crane School of Theology at Tufts University and influential 20th-century American Universalist

== Scientists and academics ==
- Henry David Abraham, M.D., psychiatrist
- David Adler, physicist and MIT professor
- Noubar Afeyan, billionaire co-founder of Moderna
- Alice Standish Allen, the first female engineering geologist in North America
- Charles Bachman, computer scientist and early developer of database management systems
- Kenneth Bainbridge, physicist and director of the Trinity test during the Manhattan Project
- Nariman Behravesh, economic forecaster
- Tim Berners-Lee, computer scientist and creator of the World Wide Web
- Andrea Bertozzi, mathematician
- Carolyn R. Bertozzi, Nobel Prize in Chemistry
- Sangeeta Bhatia, MIT nanotechnologist, biomedical engineer, entrepreneur, professor.
- Konrad Bloch, Nobel Prize in Medicine
- Nicolaas Bloembergen, Nobel Prize in Physics
- Noam Chomsky, professor of linguistics at MIT, creator of the theory of generative grammar, noted political activist, commentator, and author
- Wesley A. Clark, American physicist and computer scientist, credited with designing the first modern personal computer
- John M. Deutch, Deputy Secretary of Defense (1994–1995), Director of Central Intelligence (DCI) (1995–1996) and professor of chemistry at MIT
- Peter A. Diamond, 2010 Nobel Prize in Economics, Professor of Economics at MIT
- Pavel Etingof, mathematician, fellow of the American Mathematics Society, and professor at MIT
- Henry Louis Gates, Jr., African-American Studies scholar, co-editor of Encarta Africana encyclopedia
- Peter Glaser, pioneer in solar energy engineering
- George B. Grant, inventor of calculators and gear industry pioneer
- Jonathan Gruber, professor of Economics at MIT and former Deputy Assistant Secretary of the U. S. Treasury
- Cyrus Hamlin, co-founder of Robert College in Istanbul
- Oliver Hart, 2016 Nobel Prize in Economics, Professor of Economics at Harvard
- Yu-Chi Ho, mathematician
- Gerald Holton, American physicist, historian of science, and educator
- Jon Kabat-Zinn, creator of Mindfulness-based stress reduction
- Charles P. Kindleberger, economic historian
- Gerald S. Lesser (1926–2010), psychologist who played a major role in developing the educational programming included in Sesame Street
- Abraham Loeb, chair of Astronomy department and director of the Institute for Theory & Computation, Harvard University
- Salvador Luria, Nobel Prize in Medicine
- Douglas Melton, pioneer of stem cell research
- Mario Molina, Nobel Prize in Chemistry
- David Saville Muzzey, historian
- Joseph Nye, political analyst, author of Soft power
- Cathy O'Neil, Data Scientist, Occupier and blogger at mathbabe. LHS Grad
- Cecilia Payne-Gaposchkin, astronomer known for her work on spectral analysis of stars. Awarded the Henry Norris Russell Lectureship by the American Astronomical Society in 1976
- John Rawls, philosopher; known for his theory of justice
- Oliver Selfridge, computer scientist, pioneer in the field of artificial intelligence
- Clifford Shull, Nobel Prize in Physics
- Robert Solow, Nobel Prize-winning economist
- Ilya Somin law professor at George Mason University, Chair in Constitutional Studies at the Cato Institute, blogger for the Volokh Conspiracy
- John Tate, mathematician and 2010 Abel Prize winner
- Samuel Ting, Nobel Prize in Physics
- Sheila E. Widnall, aerospace researcher and educator at MIT, former Secretary of the Air Force
- Drew Weissman, Nobel Prize in Physiology or Medicine
- Edward Osborne Wilson, entomologist and two-time Pulitzer Prize-winning author

== Writers ==
- Joseph Dennie, writer
- David Elkind, child psychologist and author
- Philip Elmer-DeWitt, science editor for Time Magazine
- Tama Janowitz, author, Slaves of New York (1986)
- X. J. Kennedy, noted poet and writer
- Francis Rosa, journalist for The Boston Globe
- Ruth Sawyer, author, winner of the Newbery Medal
- Simon Schama, historian, art historian and presenter
- Alice G. Schirmer, nurse and cookbook writer
- Edward Osborne Wilson, entomologist and two-time Pulitzer Prize-winning author
- Marjan Kamali, author
