= 1945 in architecture =

List of years in architecture	(table)
- … 1935; 1936; 1937; 1938; 1939; 1940; 1941; 1942; 1943; 1944; 1945; 1946; 1947; 1948; 1949; 1950; 1951; 1952; 1953; 1954; 1955 …
- Buildings and structures: Art; Archaeology; Architecture; Literature; Music; Philosophy; Science; +...

The year 1945 in architecture involved some significant events.

== Events ==
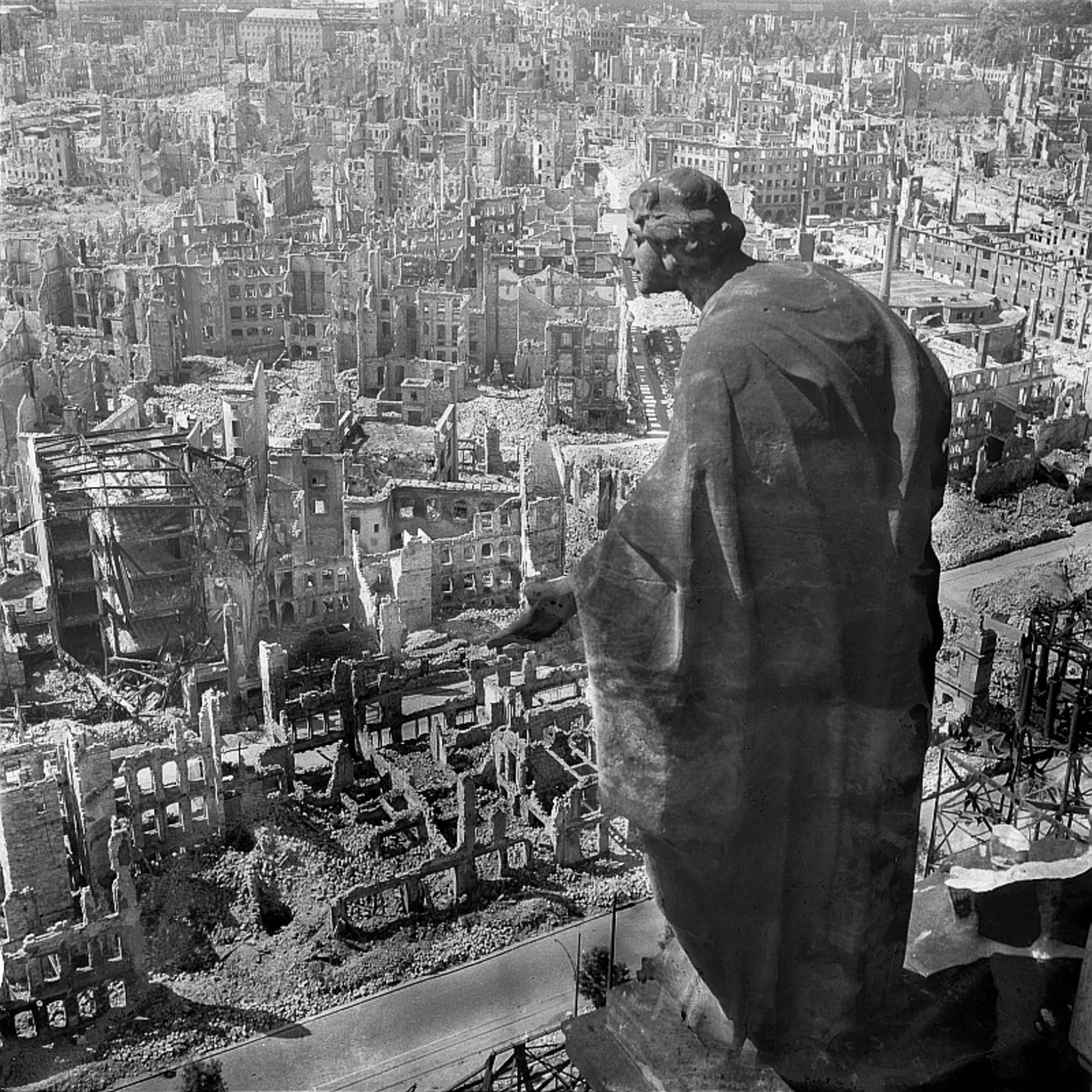
Dresden: view from the city hall (Rathaus) over the bombed city

- February 13–15 – The bombing of Dresden by the British Royal Air Force and the United States Army Air Forces destroys 13 square miles (34 km^{2}) of the city, and causes a firestorm that consumes the city centre. Landmarks destroyed include the Frauenkirche, the Semperoper (the Saxony state opera house), and the Zwinger Palace. In the decades following the end of the war, some of the lost buildings are reconstructed.
- October 26 – Bierut Decree nationalizes most land in Warsaw prior to the city's reconstruction following the destruction of Warsaw.
- Auguste Perret is appointed architect for the reconstruction of Le Havre.
- The Architects Collaborative is established in Cambridge, Massachusetts by founding members Norman C. Fletcher (1917–2007), Jean B. Fletcher (1915–1965), John C. Harkness (1916–2016), Sarah P. Harkness (1914–2013), Robert S. McMillan (1916–2001), Louis A. McMillen (1916–1998), Benjamin C. Thompson (1918–2002), and Walter Gropius (1883–1969). TAC becomes known as one of the most notable firms in post-war modernism.

== Buildings and structures ==
=== Buildings ===
- Hallgrímskirkja, a church in Reykjavík, Iceland is started.

== Awards ==
- RIBA Royal Gold Medal – Victor Vesnin.
- Grand Prix de Rome, architecture – Jean Dubuisson and Jean de Mailly.

== Publications ==
- John Summerson – Georgian London.

== Births ==
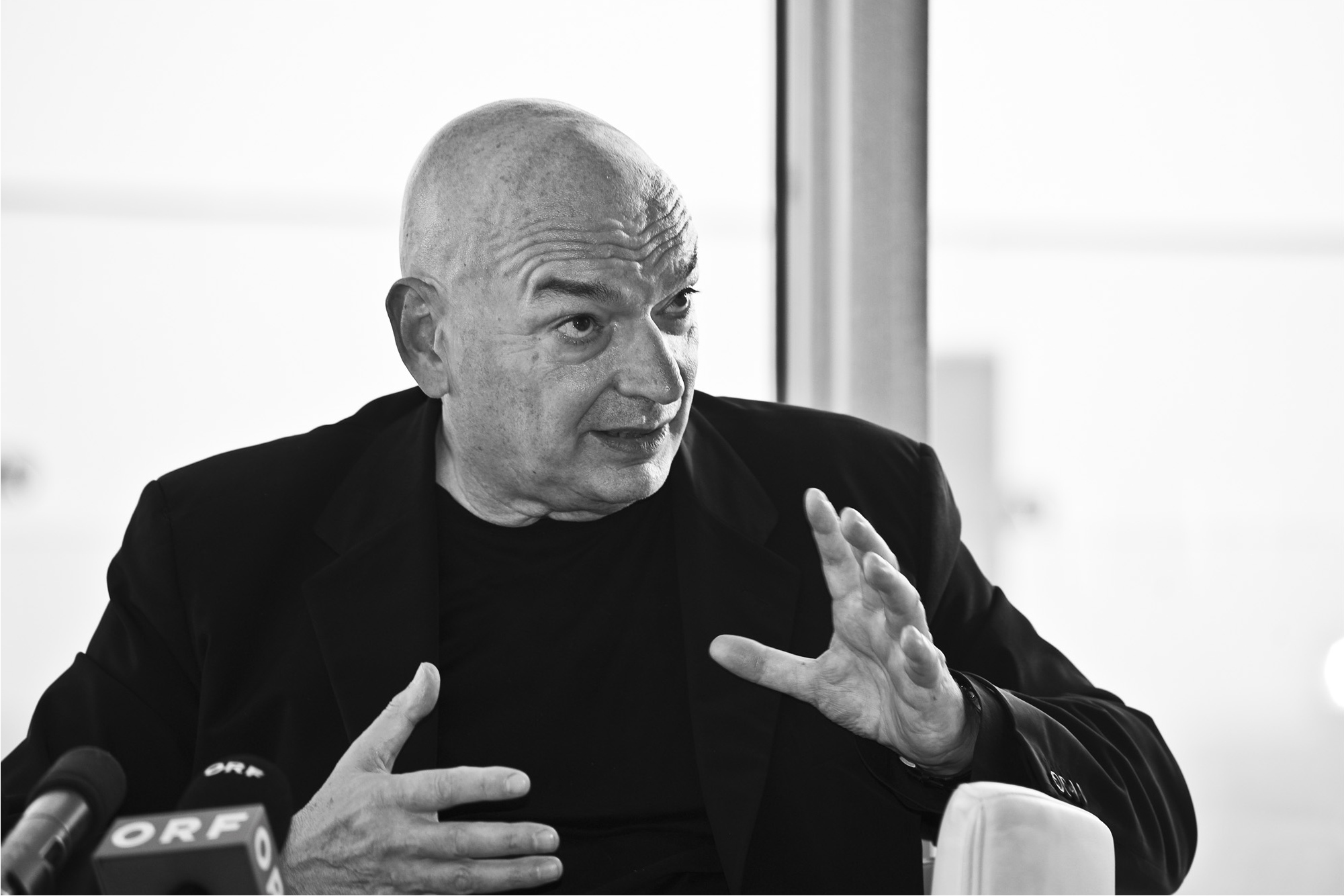
Jean Nouvel

- July 1 – Chris Wilkinson, English architect, co-founder of WilkinsonEyre (died 2021)
- August 12 – Jean Nouvel, French architect
- Rasem Badran, Palestine-born Jordanian/Saudi Arabian architect
- Álvaro Barrera, Colombian restoration architect
- Stephen Carter, American architect
- John Frazer, English architectural academic, CAD pioneer

== Deaths ==
- January 29 – Ilya Golosov, Soviet Russian architect (born 1883)
- February 5 – Ragnar Östberg, Swedish architect (born 1866)
- February 8 – Robert Mallet-Stevens, French architect (born 1886)
- February 10 – Baillie Scott, British architect (born 1865)
- June 20 – J. André Fouilhoux, French-born American architect (fall from building) (born 1879)
- Panteleimon Golosov, Russian Constructivist architect (born 1882)
