= Benjamin Thompson (architect) =

American architect (1918–2002)

- Born: July 3, 1918; Saint Paul, Minnesota, U.S.
- Died: August 17, 2002 (aged 84); Cambridge, Massachusetts, U.S.
- Education: Yale School of Architecture BArch (1941)
- Occupation: Architect
- Spouses: Mary Okes Thompson (m. 1942; div. 1967) Jane Fiske McCullough (m. 1969)
- Awards: AIA Gold Medal
- Practice: The Architects' Collaborative (TAC); Benjamin Thompson and Associates (BTA); Design Research (store)

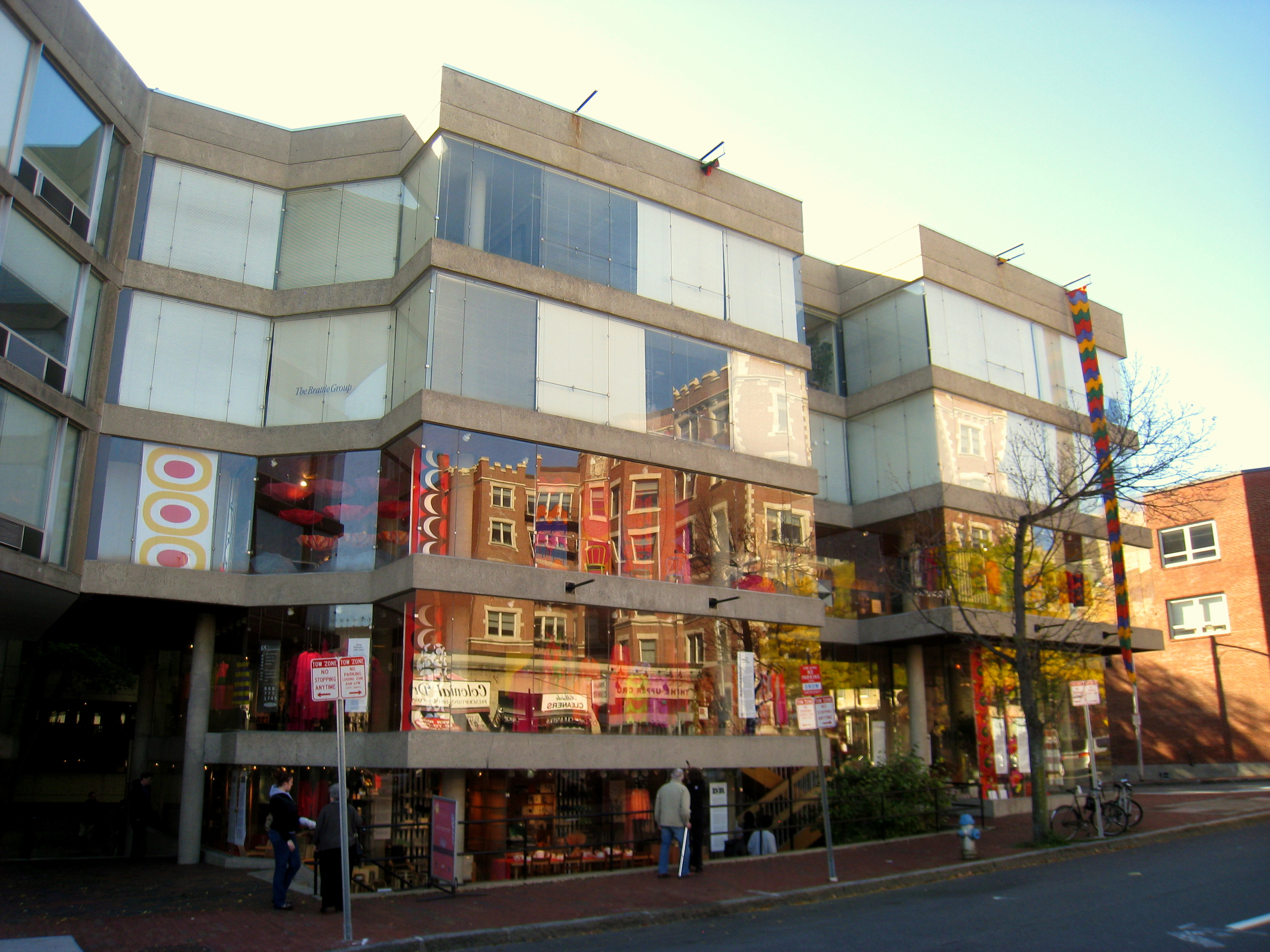
Design Research International - Cambridge, Massachusetts, US

Benjamin C. Thompson (July 3, 1918 – August 17, 2002) was an American architect. He was one of eight architects who founded The Architects Collaborative (TAC) in 1945 in Cambridge, Massachusetts, one of the most notable firms in post-war modernism, and then started his own firm, Benjamin Thompson and Associates (BTA), in 1967.

== Early life and education ==
Thompson was born in Saint Paul, Minnesota, to Benjamin C Thompson and Lillian Mudge. He spent early years on his family's farm, and received his early education at St. Paul Academy and at Avon Old Farms School, a progressive school founded by architect Theodate Pope Riddle in Avon, Connecticut. His interest in architecture was nurtured by travels in Europe with his mother, an artist and art collector. In the fall of 1938 he entered the Yale School of Architecture, where he earned a Bachelor of Architecture degree in 1941. He served for four years in the United States Navy during World War II as a Lieutenant aboard a Destroyer Escort in the North Atlantic and Pacific theaters. He completed his service in the Office of Strategic Services, and provided design services at the United Nations founding conference in San Francisco.

Near the end of the war, Thompson's ship docked in Boston, and he was introduced to Walter Gropius, founder of the Bauhaus School and then head of the Harvard Graduate School of Design.

== Career ==
=== The Architects Collaborative ===
Thompson began his architectural career in 1946 as one of seven founders of The Architects Collaborative (TAC) which also included Norman C. Fletcher, Jean B. Fletcher, John C. Harkness, Sarah P. Harkness, Robert S. McMillan and Louis A. McMillen. The young architects persuaded the well-known Bauhaus founder, Walter Gropius, to join the firm and provide them with guidance. Their first project was an innovative, modernist development in Lexington, Massachusetts which they named Six Moon Hill. All of the TAC founders settled there in houses they collaboratively designed, with the exception of Gropius who had already built his home, Gropius House in Lincoln, Massachusetts.

TAC's philosophy led them to emphasize collaboration as opposed celebrating individual "stars." They did however use the term "partner in charge" to identify the people with primary responsibility for a particular project. Thompson's first project for an educational institution was a set of new buildings for the historic Phillips Academy in Andover, Massachusetts (begun in 1959). Thompson was partner in charge for three major building groups for Brandeis University in Waltham, Massachusetts during an 11-year period beginning 1961. These were the Academic Quadrangle (1961), the Social Science Center (1961, three buildings), and the East Quadrangle (1964). On the occasion of the university's 50th anniversary in 1999, it was observed that "[no other architect] has contributed more to the overall campus image than Benjamin Thompson". Thompson relied on a consistent vocabulary at Brandeis: low horizontal structures with heavy, flat overhanging roofs; structural concrete frames with non-bearing exterior walls; few visual tricks or trendiness; and an "almost Japanese attitude toward composition and siting". Thompson's buildings for Brandeis include:

- David & Irene Schwartz Hall (1961)
- Schiffman Humanities Center (1961)
- Lemberg Hall Day Care Center
- Morris Brown Social Science Center
- Olin-Sang American Civilization Center(1961)
- Golding Judaic Center (1961)
- Rabb Graduate Center (1965)
- Swig Student Center (1964)
- Heller Graduate School for Advanced Studies (1966)
- Lown School of Near Eastern and Judaic Studies (1972)

Other projects for which Thompson was primarily responsible while at TAC include Greylock Quadrangle (1964-1965) at Williams College in Williamstown, Massachusetts.

In 1966 Thompson left TAC to form his own firm, Benjamin Thompson & Associates (BTA). As described by his son, Anthony Thompson, his strong entrepreneurial spirit and individualism were at cross purposes to TAC's focus on "communal housing and social responsibility." Jane Thompson also noted a "divergence of convictions" with many partners not seeing the value to TAC of the Design Research line of work Thompson had initiated.

=== Design Research ===
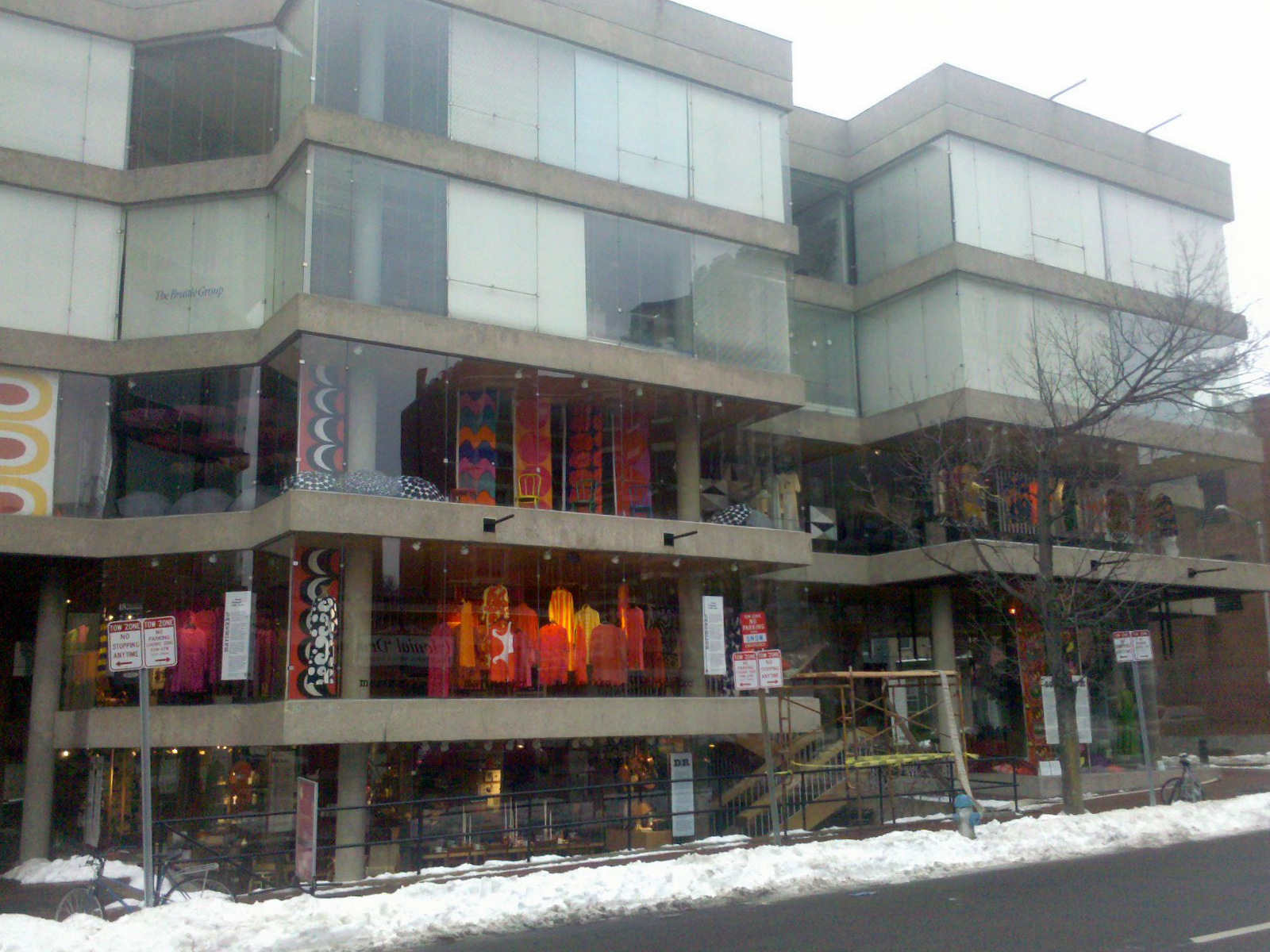
Design Research Building Dec 2009 with Marimekko exhibit on the 40th anniversary of the founding of DR

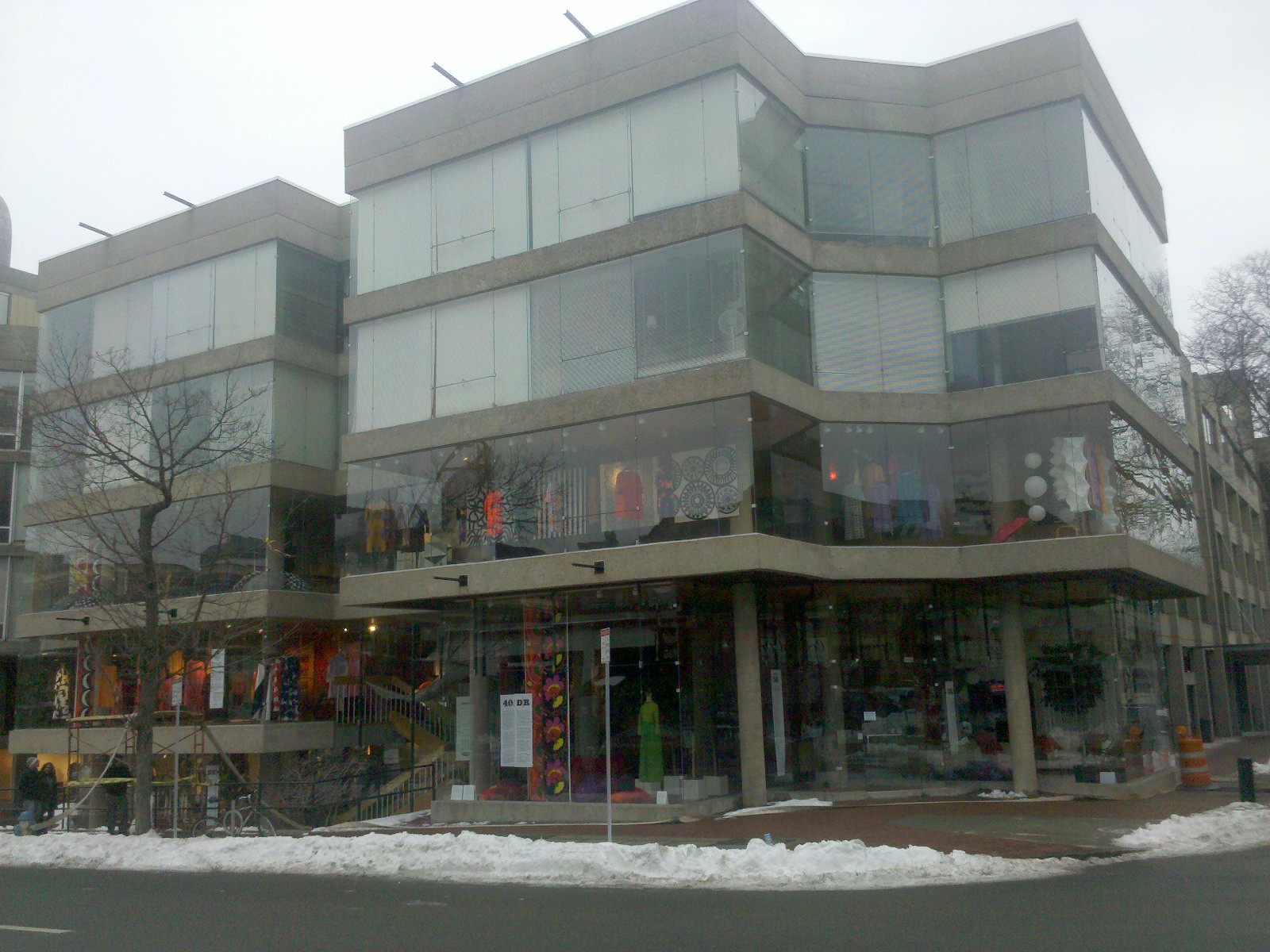
A view from the corner of the Design Research Building in December 2009

In 1953, he founded Design Research in Cambridge, a company that provided interior furnishings and accessories. His iconic five-story, all-glass showcase retail store for Design Research was opened in Harvard Square, Cambridge, Massachusetts, in 1968. Design Research was the first US importer and retailer of the Finnish clothing and textiles of Marimekko. The firm eventually added stores in New York (1964) and San Francisco (1965). In 1969, he designed the company's revolutionary second Cambridge store, notable for its extreme openness and use of glass. In 1970, Thompson lost financial control and ownership of Design Research.

=== Festival Marketplaces ===
Thompson is probably best known for his creation of the Faneuil Hall Marketplace (1976) in Boston, Massachusetts which incorporated the historic Faneuil Hall and Quincy Market buildings. In this and other similar projects his firm worked in collaboration with the firm of developer James W. Rouse. In this work, he also worked closely with Jane Fiske Thompson, who later became his second wife and frequent collaborator. The Marketplace epitomized Thompson's perspective that vital cities required people to interact with art directly, and that good food, lively design, and commerce can all be part of the experience. This project was an early example of the now widely employed "adaptive reuse" of historic buildings that have outlived their original purposes. Thompson & Rouse were likely inspired by an earlier Boston project featuring reuse of a historic building by Carl Koch. In 1973, Koch, functioning as both architect and developer, had transformed the beautiful but obsolete Lewis Wharf warehouses into luxury condominiums.

In the following decade, Thompson and Rouse worked together on other festival marketplaces including Harborplace (Baltimore, 1980), South Street Seaport (New York, 1985), Bayside Marketplace (Miami, 1987), and Jacksonville Landing (Jacksonville, 1987).

=== Practice and teaching ===
Thompson's interest in modernism was balanced by appreciation of older architecture. In the late 1950s, he renovated Harvard Yard's historic dormitories by updating their interior arrangements without visible exterior effect. Shortly thereafter he persuaded Harvard to remodel Boylston Hall (built 1857) rather than demolish it.

During those years, Thompson taught architecture at the Harvard Graduate School of Design, and served as Chair of the Architecture Department 1964–1968. His 1966 essay, “Visual Squalor and Social Disorder”, argued for an urban architecture that would encourage, rather than discourage, joy and social life. To this end, in 1967 he proposed reviving Boston's obsolescent, historic wholesale food markets with food stalls, cafes, restaurants, and pushcarts appealing to the general public.

== Honors ==
Thompson received honorary doctorates from Colby College, the University of Massachusetts Amherst, and Minneapolis College of Art and Design. In 1987, BTA received the AIA Firm Award and in 1992, Thompson received the highest honor in American architecture, the Gold Medal of the American Institute of Architects.

== Projects ==
- Design Research Headquarters in Cambridge, Massachusetts
- Harborplace in Baltimore, Maryland
- South Street Seaport in Manhattan, New York
- Bayside Marketplace in Miami, Florida
- Jacksonville Landing in Jacksonville, Florida
- Faneuil Hall Marketplace in Boston, Massachusetts
- Union Station in Washington, D.C.
- Old Post Office Pavilion in Washington, D.C.
- Broward Center for the Performing Arts in Fort Lauderdale, Florida

== Gallery ==
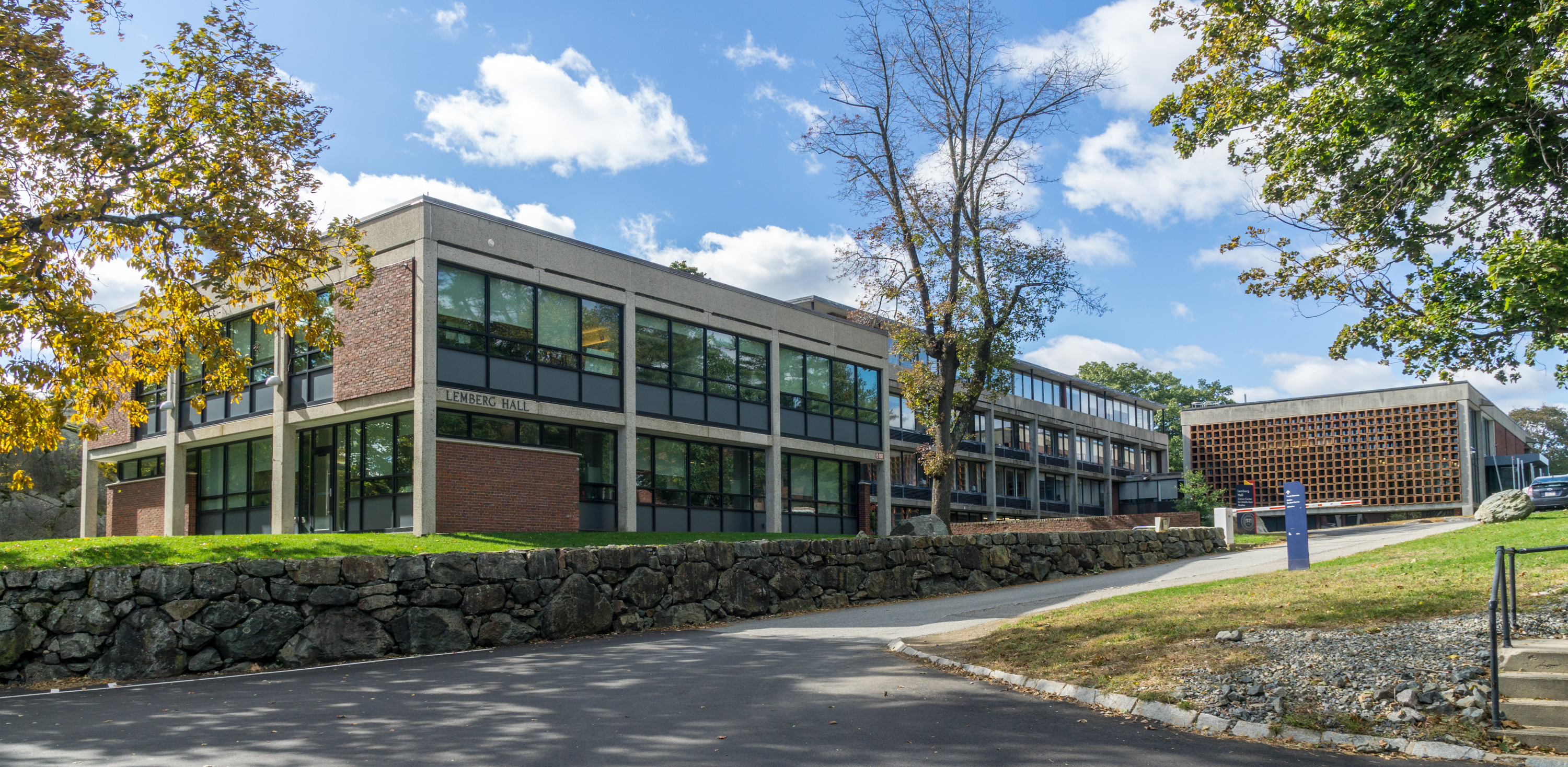
Lemberg Hall and Social Science Center, Brandeis University (1961)

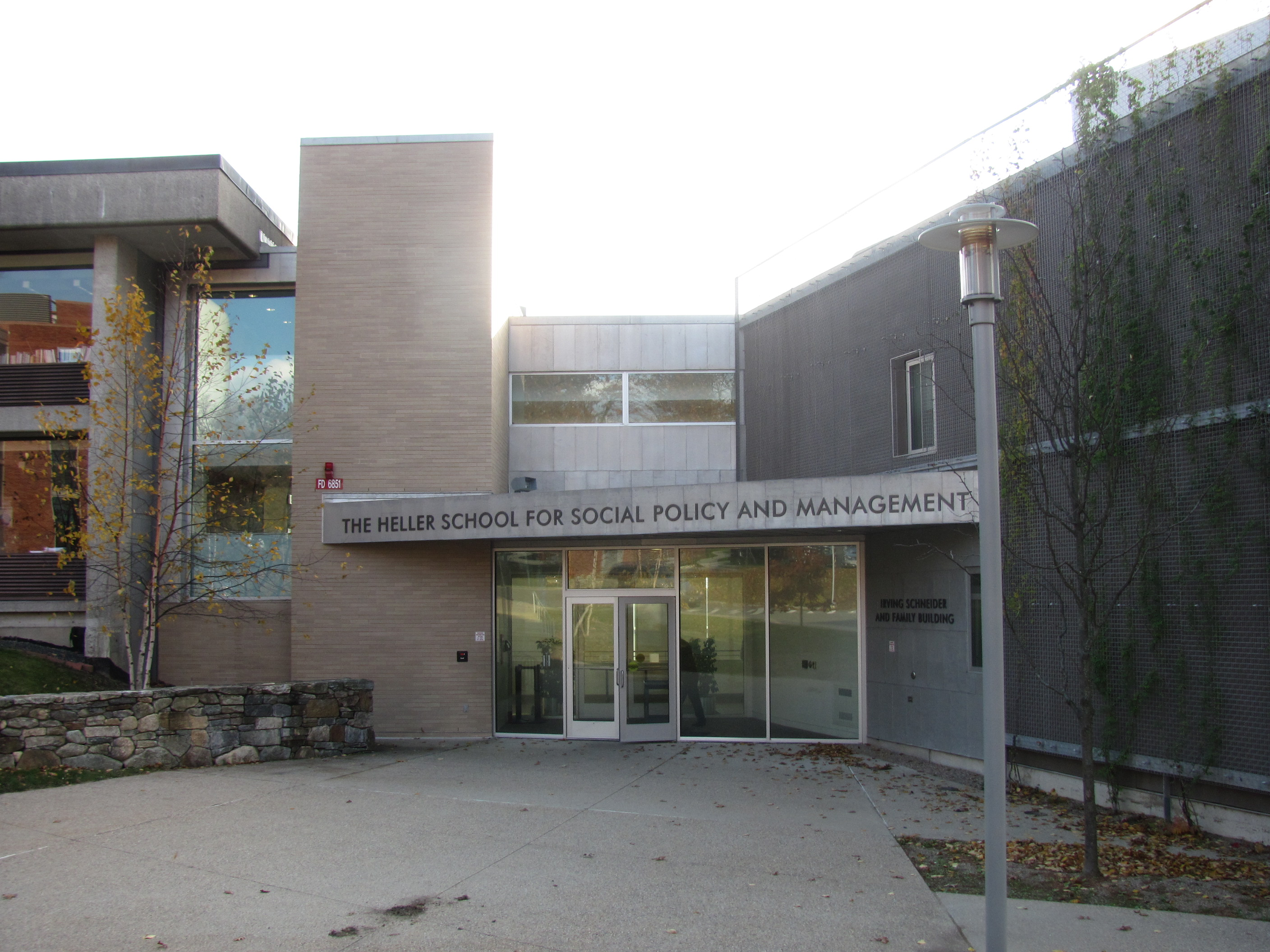
Heller School (1966)

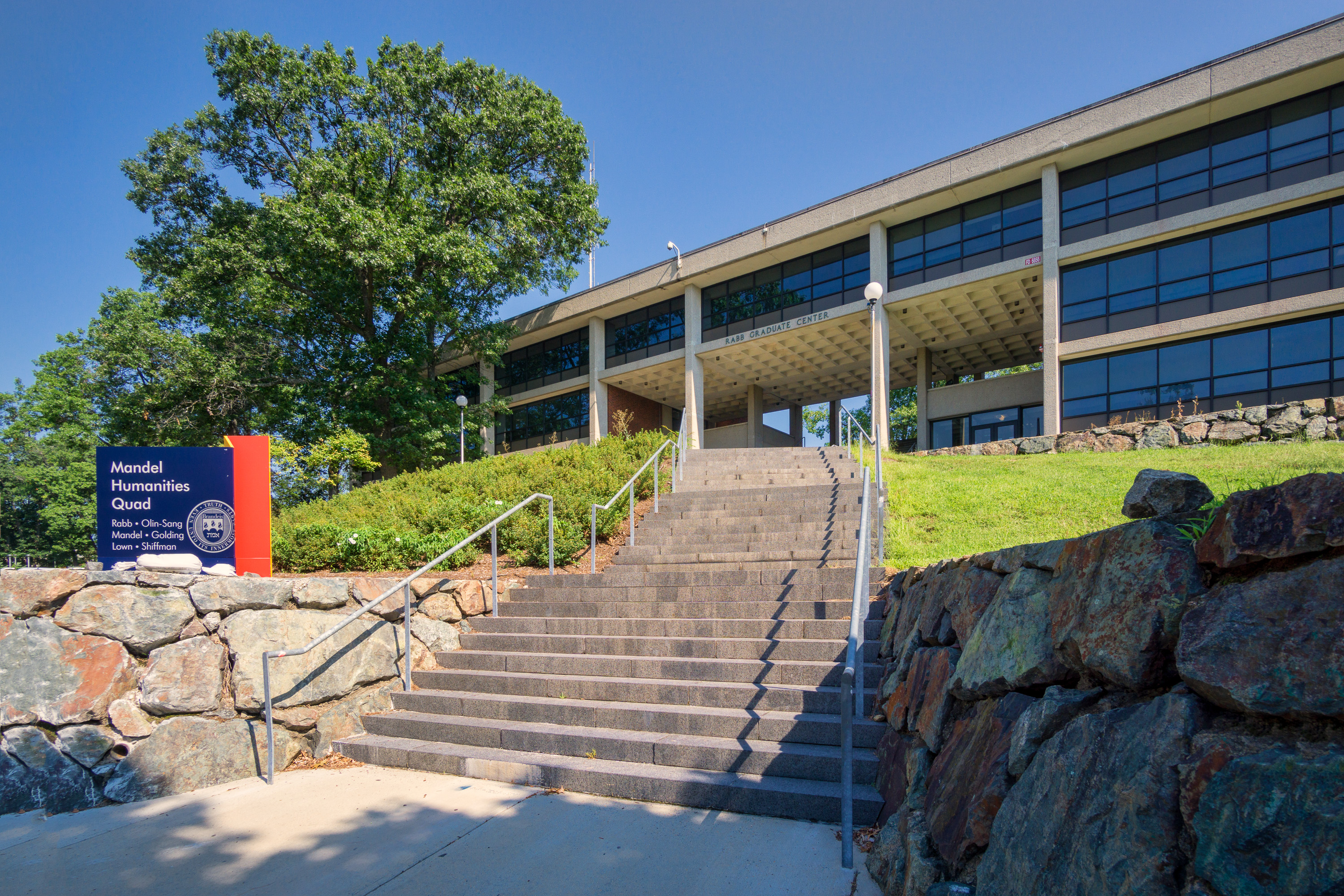
Rabb Graduate Center (1965)

== Personal life ==
Benjamin Thompson was first married to Mary Okes Thompson from 1942 to 1967. The Thompsons lived on Six Moon Hill, an innovative residential development in Lexington, Massachusetts that was one of TAC's earliest projects. She continued to live there until her death in 2004. They had five children. In 1959, they purchased a seven-acre waterfront property in Barnstable where the family spent summers together.

Thompson's second marriage was in 1969 to Jane Fiske McCullough, a writer and design critic, who handled his public relations and later became a collaborator on certain of his planning projects. He was Jane's fourth husband. They lived in Cambridge and Barnstable. Ben died in August 17, 2002 in his Cambridge home.
