= Six Moon Hill =

Modernist subdivision in Lexington, Massachusetts

- Six Moon Hill Historic District
- U.S. National Register of Historic Places
- U.S. Historic district
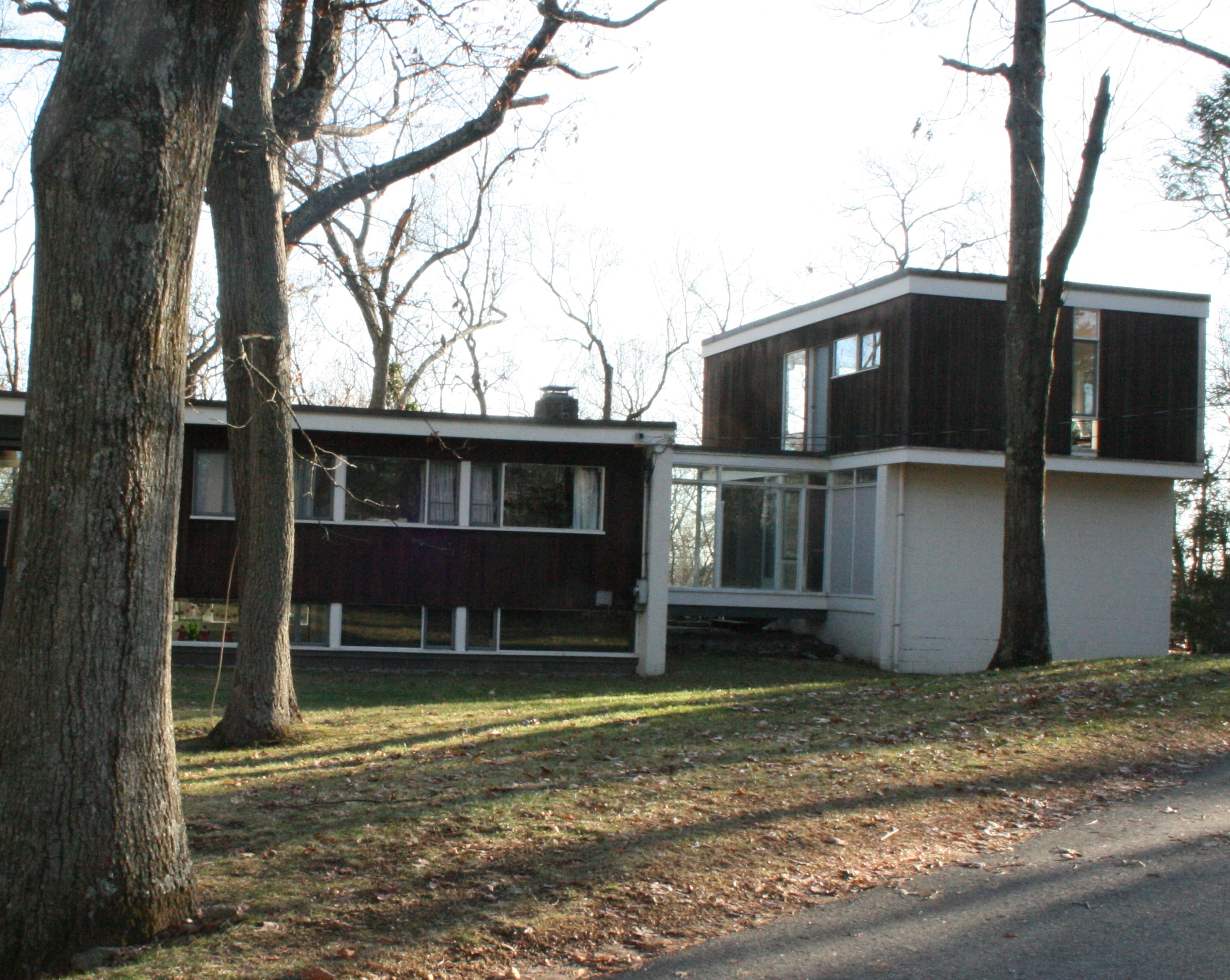
- TAC-designed house built in 1950, original home of architects Jean and Norman Fletcher

- Location within Massachusetts Location within the United States
- Location: 4, 8 Bird Hill & 1-40 Moon Hill Rds, 16, 24 Swan Ln., Lexington, Massachusetts
- Coordinates: 42°25′23″N 71°12′42″W
- Architect: The Architects Collaborative
- Architectural style: Modern
- NRHP reference No.: 15000981
- Added to NRHP: January 19, 2016

Six Moon Hill is a residential neighborhood and historic district of mid-century modern houses in Lexington, Massachusetts. Incorporated in 1947, the community originally encompassed 28 houses which were built between 1947 and 1953. Most were designed by members of the Cambridge, Massachusetts firm The Architects Collaborative (TAC) who also lived and raised their families in the new development. The neighborhood was added to the National Register of Historic Places list in 2016.

== Background ==
After World War II, a quickly expanding population looked to develop land for housing near major metropolitan areas. The establishment in 1934 of the Federal Housing Administration (FHA) which underwrote mortgages and the GI Bill which subsidized low-cost mortgages for returning soldiers were factors in the rapid growth of suburban communities. Many large planned communities resulted, such as Levittown, New York (and other related Levittowns in Pennsylvania, New Jersey, and Puerto Rico) and Rohnert Park in California. But, with involvement of the FHA came some undesirable constraints on both design and the racial makeup of homeowners. In Cambridge, students at the Harvard Graduate School of Design and MIT School of Architecture and Planning were also thinking about housing and planned communities, but wanted to bring some of the new ideas emerging from those schools to how the problems should be addressed.

In 1947, a group of architects from the newly-formed TAC were looking to move from their rented lodgings in Cambridge and had the idea of building their own community. Their goals were two-fold: build homes based on modern design principles and establish an ideal community. Norman Fletcher, one of the founders of TAC and Six Moon Hill, described the young architects as having been influenced in their ideas by "utopianism and socialism".

Modernism as an approach to housing design was already established in Massachusetts when they began their work. Walter Gropius and Marcel Breuer built houses for their families in what is now the Woods End Road Historic District in Lincoln, Massachusetts, in 1938–1940. Carl Koch, later to gain renown as a pioneer in the use of prefabricated materials in construction, built a set of five houses called ‘Snake Hill” on steeply sloped land in Belmont, Massachusetts, in 1940. In a nearby area in east Lexington, Hugh Stubbins Jr. finished the first of a set of houses in 1947, just around the time TAC bought the land for the Six Moon Hill project.

An indication of the cooperative nature of TAC's endeavor was that after house sites had been drawn up, they were all priced the same. The first twelve sites were assigned to participating families by drawing numbers from a hat. The egalitarianism of the neighborhood also reflected the philosophy of Walter Gropius and TAC. All members of TAC, including Gropius, had equal shares in the company, and he insisted that he not be looked at as the president. Of the original TAC founders, only Gropius did not have a house on Moon Hill, having already built his house (Gropius House) in Lincoln, Massachusetts.

The group found the land in Lexington during a Sunday ski outing. It was purchased from an auto dealer of the Moon Motor Car, and the project was given the name "Six Moon Hill", a nod to the six automobiles found in a barn on the property. It turned out that one of the cars was a Franklin, but they liked the original name too much to change it.

With a focus on collaboration rather than individualism, the TAC approach was applied to all aspects of the community: design, development, construction, and operation. TAC established a nonprofit corporation and bought 20 acres (81,000 m^{2}) on which to build, which were divided into 29 equally-priced lots of about one-half to three-quarters of an acre each. The neighborhood continues to run as an organized community in which each household pays dues and holds two voting shares.

== Architecture ==
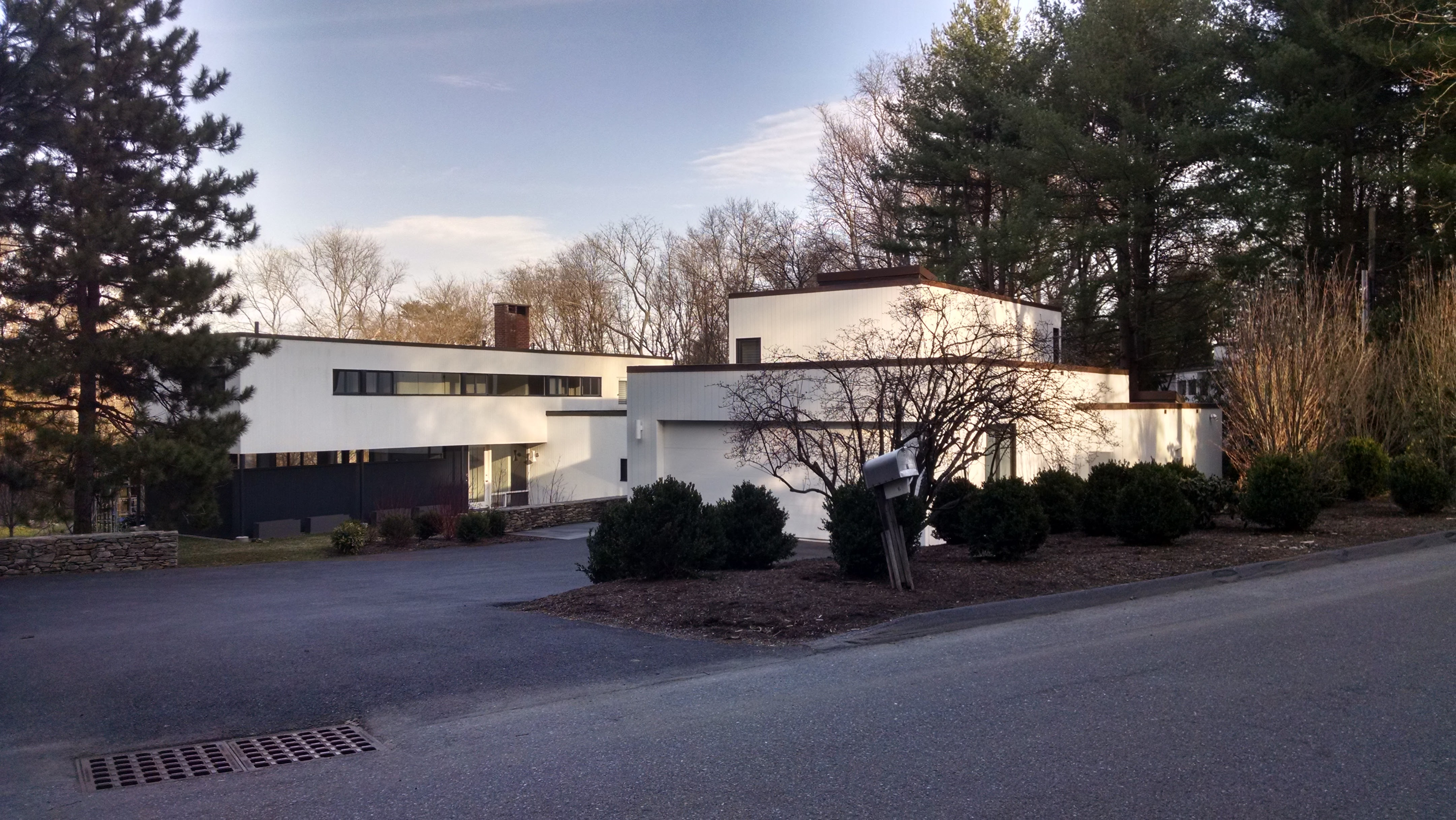
TAC-designed house from 1950, with recent additions

Although TAC members claimed that they were not trying to create a "style", the houses can be seen as reflecting many features of what is now thought of as the mid-century modern style: the houses all have flat, low-pitched, or butterfly roofs, narrow vertical siding, whole walls of glass, and a total lack of extraneous ornament. Among the design innovations employed in early homes were the use of radiant heating embedded in concrete or slate floors, use of bubble skylights manufactured originally as World War II bomber turrets, and the early adoption of flexible open plan interiors. TAC's willingness to experiment with industrial materials was an example of Modernists' embracing of the "rise of the machine". Modernists saw industrialization as a potential force for good and were eager to experiment with new materials, finding value in the use of unadorned materials that would have been shunned in more traditional buildings.

Not all of the TAC innovations were successful. Anthony Thompson, who grew up there and was the son of TAC partner Ben Thompson, noted he loved living there, but that "the roof leaked. The house was drafty. There was no privacy. Form did not follow function."

Six Moon Hill gained early prestige when an article in Architectural Forum featured dramatic photographs by Ezra Stoller who had previously published key works by Frank Lloyd Wright and Alvar Aalto. As described in that 1950 article, three year's after the neighborhood's incorporation, 19 houses had been built with costs ranging from $10,000 to $22,000 with 1,100-to-2,200-square-foot (100 to 200 m^{2}) floor plans—moderate in both price and size.

== Landscape and environment ==
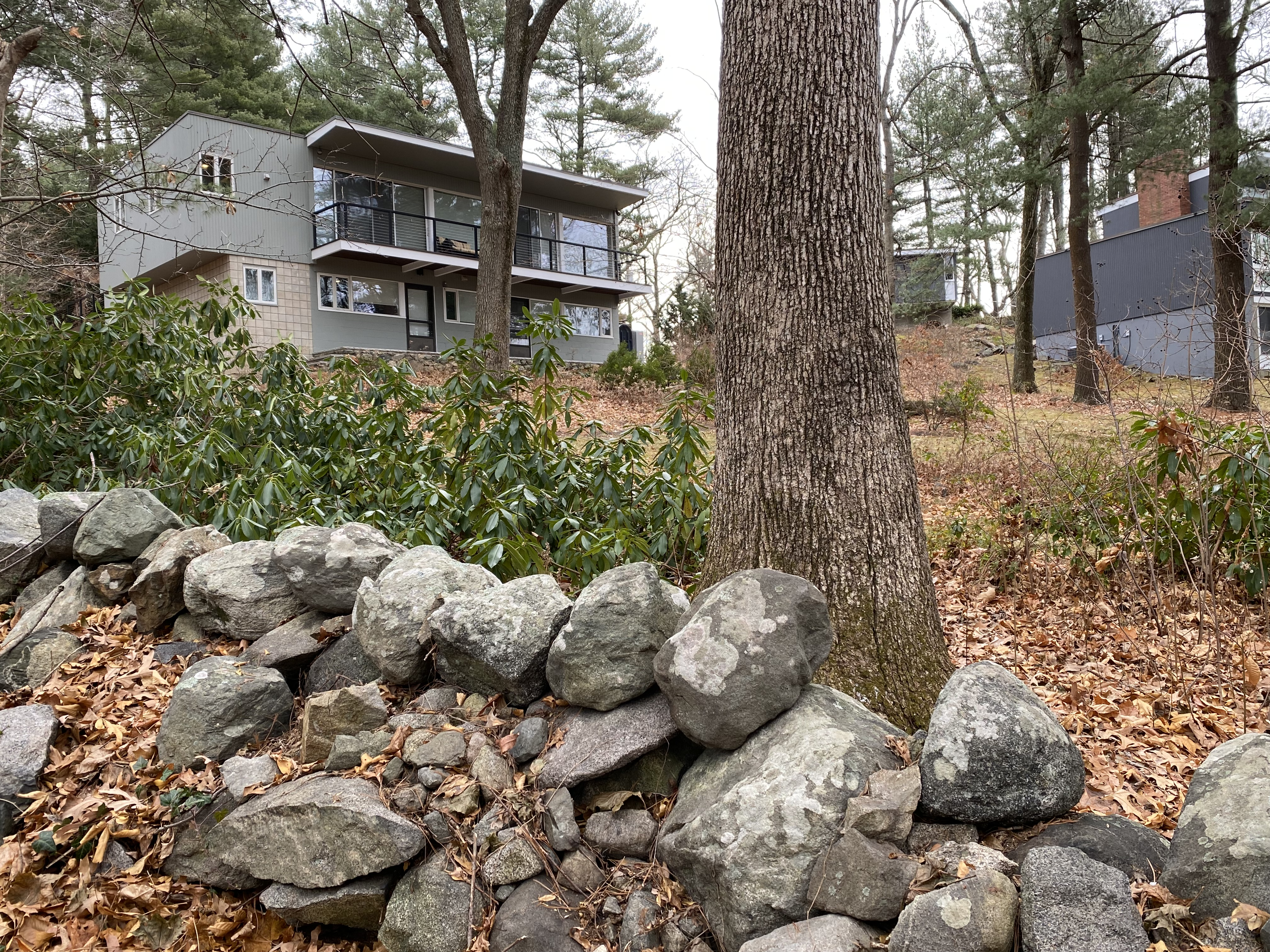
Rough, lichen-covered stone walls can be found throughout the neighborhood

The rocky hill on which the neighborhood is built provides many visual reminders of New England's glacial past, with large expanses of granite ledge visible outside and sometimes inside the houses. The neighborhood is crossed with rough stone walls of a form typical to this part of New England, which are essentially linear piles of large rocks, placed there by settlers in the 18th and early 19th century. At the time the former grazing land was purchased by TAC, some of the steeper areas had become reforested. Photographs of the newly built houses show young juniper and birch trees, which are typical pioneer species that emerge after an area ceases to be grazed or mowed. Most recently the area is populated with many mature white pines, hickory, red and white oaks which thrive in the highly acidic, stony soil.

The terrain, which might have been considered a disadvantage to most suburban builders, was an inspiration to TAC architects. They sited their houses to take maximum advantage of distant views, winter sunlight, and summer breezes. Through thoughtful siting, they achieved an effect that was more rural in character than other neighborhoods of comparable density. They acknowledged the influence of Frank Lloyd Wright in the use of large overhangs to block out strong summer sunlight.

Although the new buildings were in many ways thoughtfully designed in relation to the landscape, a full embrace of environmental concepts by the architectural profession was many decades away. As built originally, the Six Moon Hill houses had some limitations in a New England climate. The large walls of glass that made such a visual impact were inefficient in terms of energy use. In the twenty-first century, among the first undertakings for those purchasing homes from early owners has been to replace the ubiquitous single-pane glass and uninsulated metal window frames.

Similarly, the flat roofs that are typical of mid-century modern houses can be seen to be a disadvantage in a climate that routinely experiences large accumulations of snow, although this was somewhat mitigated by the introduction of new roofing materials. A continuing interest in the relationship between buildings and the environment was displayed in later years by Sarah P. Harkness when she co-authored a study on the topic of sustainable design. In a later interview, she continued to emphasize that architects needed to consider the whole environment as opposed to trying to design individual "star" buildings.

== Community and family life ==
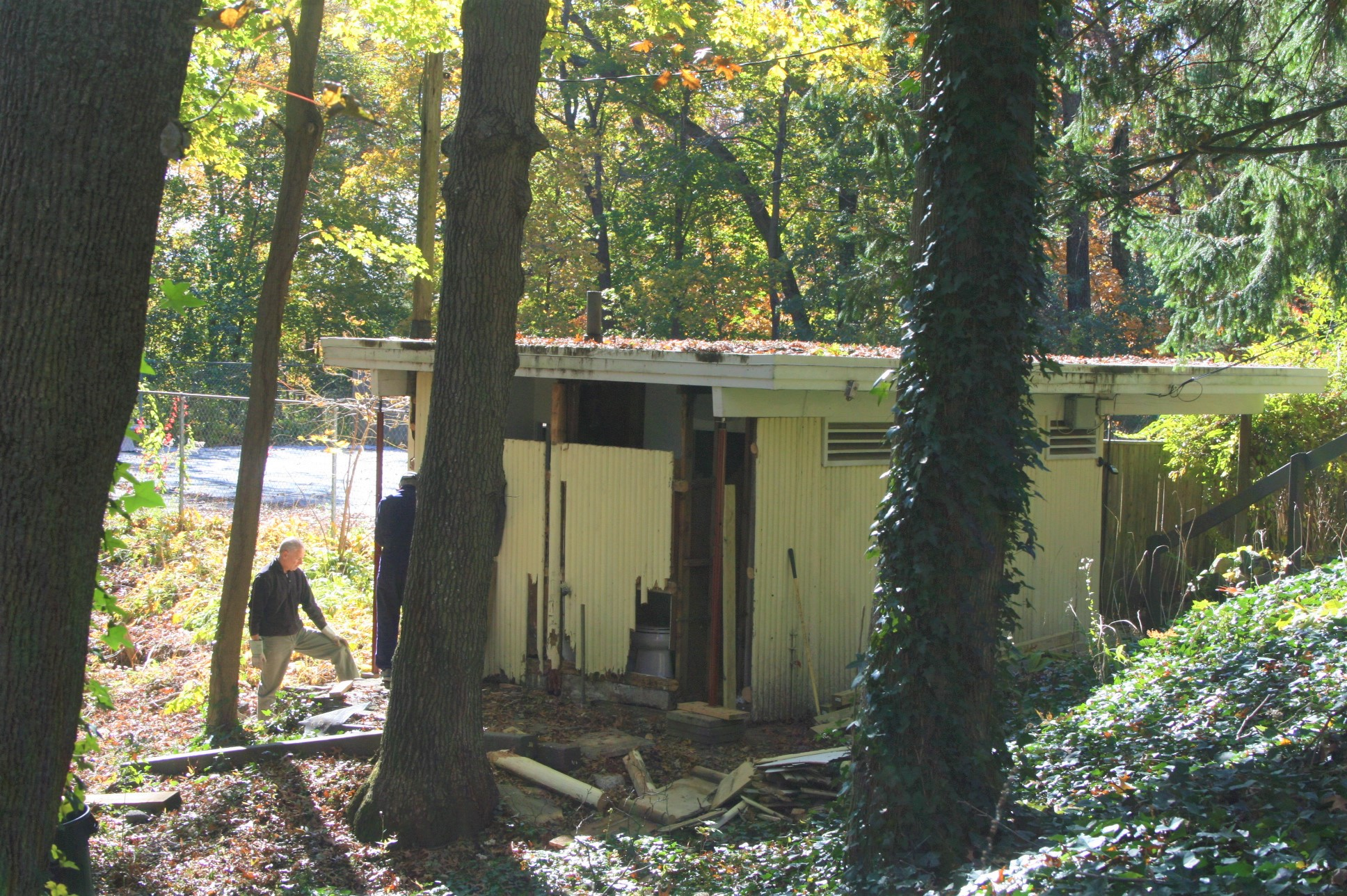
Neighborhood volunteers repair TAC-designed pool house (built ca 1960)

Although much current interest focuses on Six Moon Hill's mid-century modern architecture, TAC's greatest innovation there may have been how they reimagined neighborhoods and housing plans to better support child-rearing. The presence of two women who were also mothers among the founding partners of TAC (Jean B. Fletcher and Sarah P. Harkness) undoubtedly affected TAC's consideration of how design can improve family life. Unlike the Gropius House which features a separate kitchen intended to be staffed by a cook, Six Moon Hill houses were designed to function without servants and often featured kitchens which opened directly onto living areas, simplifying supervision of children.

TAC's philosophy affected not only the design of individual houses but also the neighborhood layout, which included a large area of common land and later a swimming pool. These shared resources were, and continue to be, popular gathering places for children and adults. Early visitors noted the informal, supportive atmosphere of the neighborhood, and the fact that children were as likely to be found in someone else's house as their own.

Although they did not use concepts of Feminism to describe how they lived, TAC partners modeled a way of life that diverged from prevailing norms in post-World War II America, including subtly different gender roles. During the year Six Moon Hill was founded, Fletcher and Harkness were featured in the local press for their novel shared schedule which enabled them to work in an office as architects while raising young children.

Also influencing the feeling of community were the early neighborhood bylaws affecting house design, the requirement to build within two years of lot purchase, and the right of neighbors to have first refusal in the event someone wanted to sell their house. A review committee made up of residents was formed to assure that new structures and additions were in keeping with the original concepts. There was a neighborhood preference to avoid fences to mark boundaries between lots, a notable departure from other neighborhoods in town, and concrete evidence that the neighborhood was considered one interrelated whole.

The community spirit was still in evidence in September, 2022 when over 70 current and former residents gathered on the neighborhood's Common Land to celebrate the 75th anniversary of the founding of Six Moon Hill. The event featured house tours, craft beer from a regional brewery named for the neighborhood, and story-telling over a potluck dinner.

== Notable residents ==
Among the original architects (and residents) were Benjamin C. Thompson, Norman C. Fletcher, Jean B. Fletcher, John C. Harkness, Sarah P. Harkness, Robert S. McMillan, and Louis A. McMillen, who were all TAC founders. Additional associated architects and founding community members included Richard S. Morehouse, William Haible, Leonard Currie (who in 1961 designed the historic Pagoda House in Blacksburg, Virginia), and Chester Nagel.

Other well-known original residents included mathematician W. T. Martin (MIT mathematics department head from 1946 to 1968), Irving Segal (a mathematician who did pioneering work in quantum mechanics, primarily at MIT), and Wallace E. Howell (a meteorologist known for developing techniques of seeding rain clouds during drought). Later notable residents included Nobel chemist Konrad Bloch, Nobel physicist Samuel C.C. Ting, Dr. Thomas C. Chalmers (a pioneer of modern medical research methods), Robert Newman, (co-founder of research firm, Bolt Beranek and Newman), and John C. Sheehan (the first chemist to synthesize penicillin).

British historian Simon Schama, who lived in the neighborhood during his time on the faculty of Harvard, called the neighborhood a "museum to international style". He favorably compared the friendliness upon his arrival in the neighborhood ("the mailbox wasn't big enough to take all the cakes and cookies which said 'Hello!'") to what he would have expected in Oxford (UK) where he had previously lived.

== Influence ==
The development attracted attention from both the architectural and popular press right away because of the contemporary design ideas, reasonable cost, and practical thinking about how to support community life. Started soon after the construction of Lexington's first modernist house, Six Moon Hill was the first of many modernist developments in Lexington. Developments that followed include Peacock Farm, started in 1951; Five Fields, also designed by TAC architects and begun in 1951; and the slightly later Turning Mill/Middle Ridge neighborhood, launched in 1956.

== Recent years ==
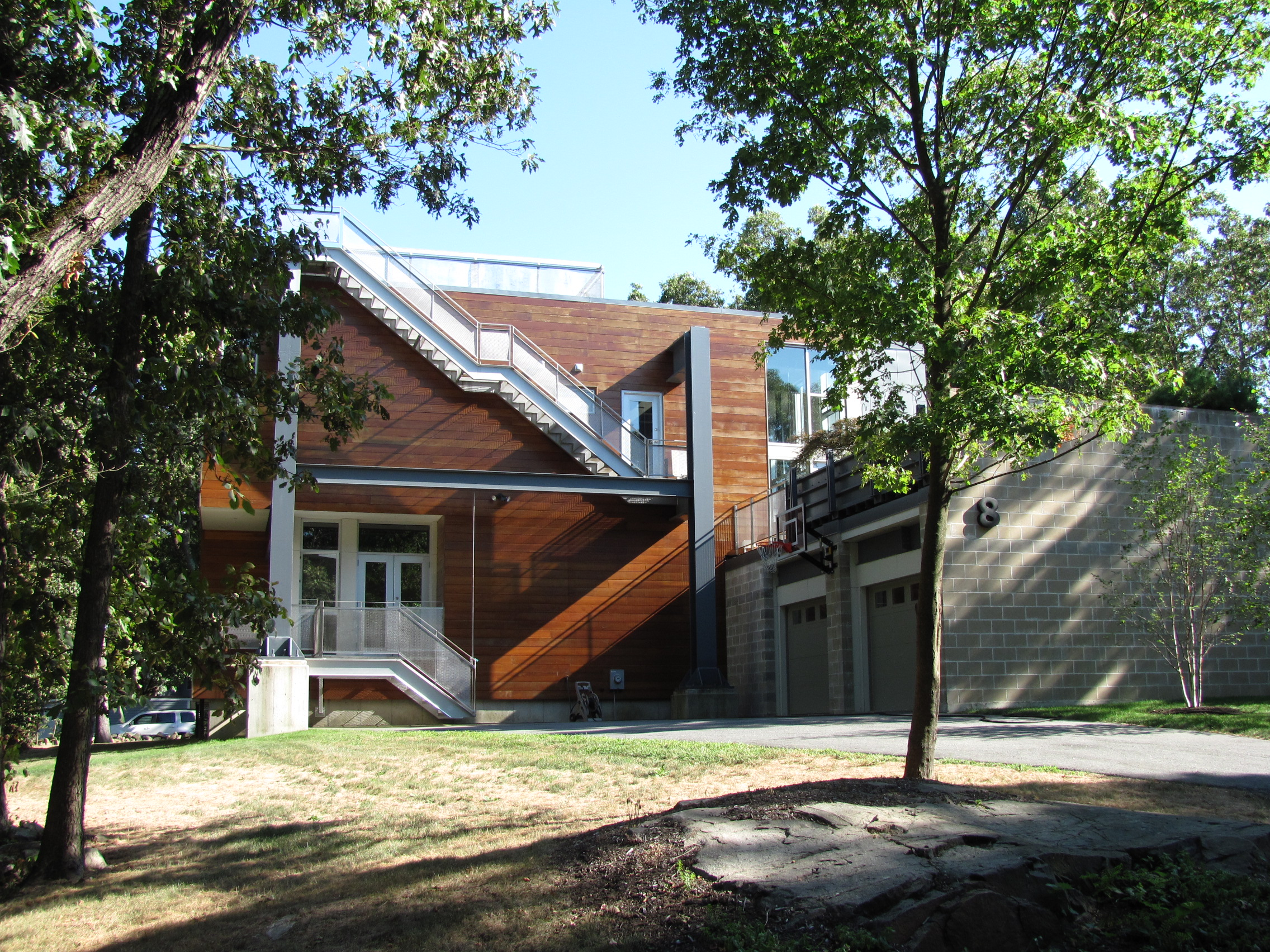
"The Big Dig House" designed by Single Speed Design, built in 2004

In 2003, the last undeveloped lot in the neighborhood was purchased by a structural engineer who had worked on the large Central Artery tunnel project in Boston. Nicknamed the "Big Dig House" after the popular name for that project, the award-winning residence was designed by architects John Hong and Jinhee Park, and recycled 300 tons of large steel and concrete components which had been removed during construction of the highway.

In 2024, a long unoccupied house at 25 Moon Hill Road was in the process of being sold to a local developer who wanted to tear it down to build a new, larger house. Because of the property's listing on Lexington's List of Cultural Resources a local bylaw required a public hearing in front of the Historical Commission to determine whether a demolition delay (21 months) should be imposed. At the January 2025 hearing, many members of the Moon Hill community spoke about the importance of renovating rather than tearing down the house. The Historical Commission voted to impose the delay. Although the intent of the bylaw is to encourage preservation, there is no means to require renovation so the future of the property is still unknown.

== See also ==
- National Register of Historic Places listings in Lexington, Massachusetts
- Peacock Farm, a later modernist development nearby designed by architect Walter Pierce
- Five Fields, another TAC designed community in Lexington, MA with modern homes
