= Boylston Hall =

Boylston Hall may refer to:

- Boylston Hall (Boston), a historic meeting space formerly located in Boston, Massachusetts
- Boylston Hall (Harvard University), a building at Harvard University
