= Five Fields =

Modernist subdivision in Lexington, Massachusetts

Coordinates: 42.419°N 71.242°W

Five Fields is a modernist residential neighborhood in Lexington, Massachusetts developed starting in 1951. It consists of 68 half-acre (0.2 hectare) lots with modernist houses on an 80-acre site designed by The Architects Collaborative (TAC). Partners in charge from TAC were Norman Fletcher and Louis McMillen with Richard Morehouse as senior associate. A 20-acre portion is held in common and includes community facilities such as a swimming pool and playground.

Setbacks from the roads were staggered and orientations varied according to the gentle rise and fall of the land. TAC preserved the farm’s old stone wall and as many old oak trees as possible. Five Fields attracted the same kind of young intellectuals [as Six Moon Hill]: The first neighborhood group that formed met to read Ancient Greek together.

—Amanda Kolson Hurley, "The Rise of the Radical Suburbs"

Five Fields was one of a series of "innovative contemporary housing developments" in Lexington, starting with Six Moon Hill (The Architects Collaborative, 1948), and then Five Fields (1951), Peacock Farm (Walter Pierce and Danforth Compton, 1952), and Turning Mill / Middle Ridge (Carl Koch, 1955). Several other modern housing developments were built later. Like the Case Study Houses in Los Angeles and the other Lexington developments, Five Fields was "intended as a corrective to the cheap historicism of many new developments".

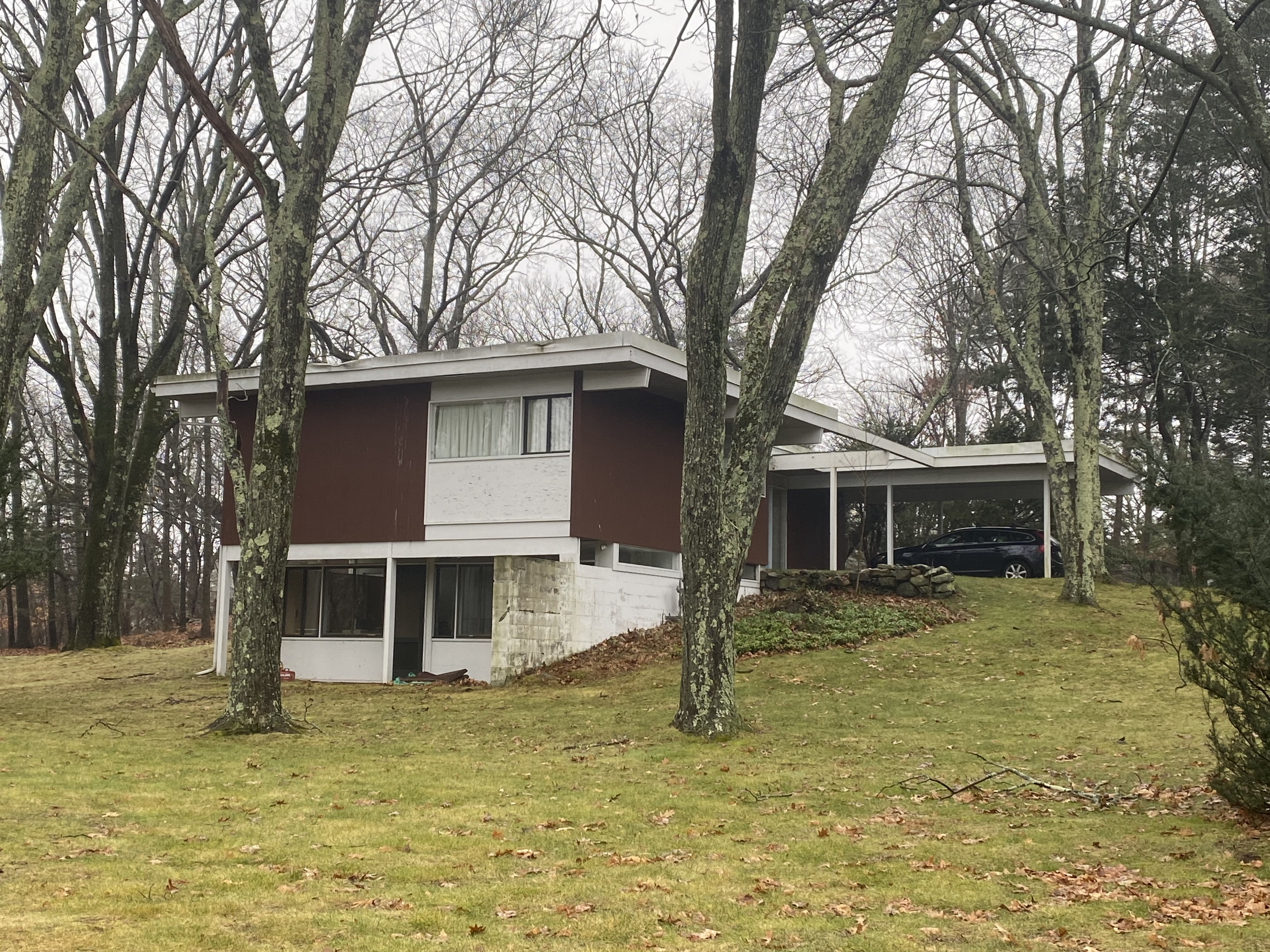
TAC-designed Five Fields house, minimally modified, built in 1954, photographed in 2022

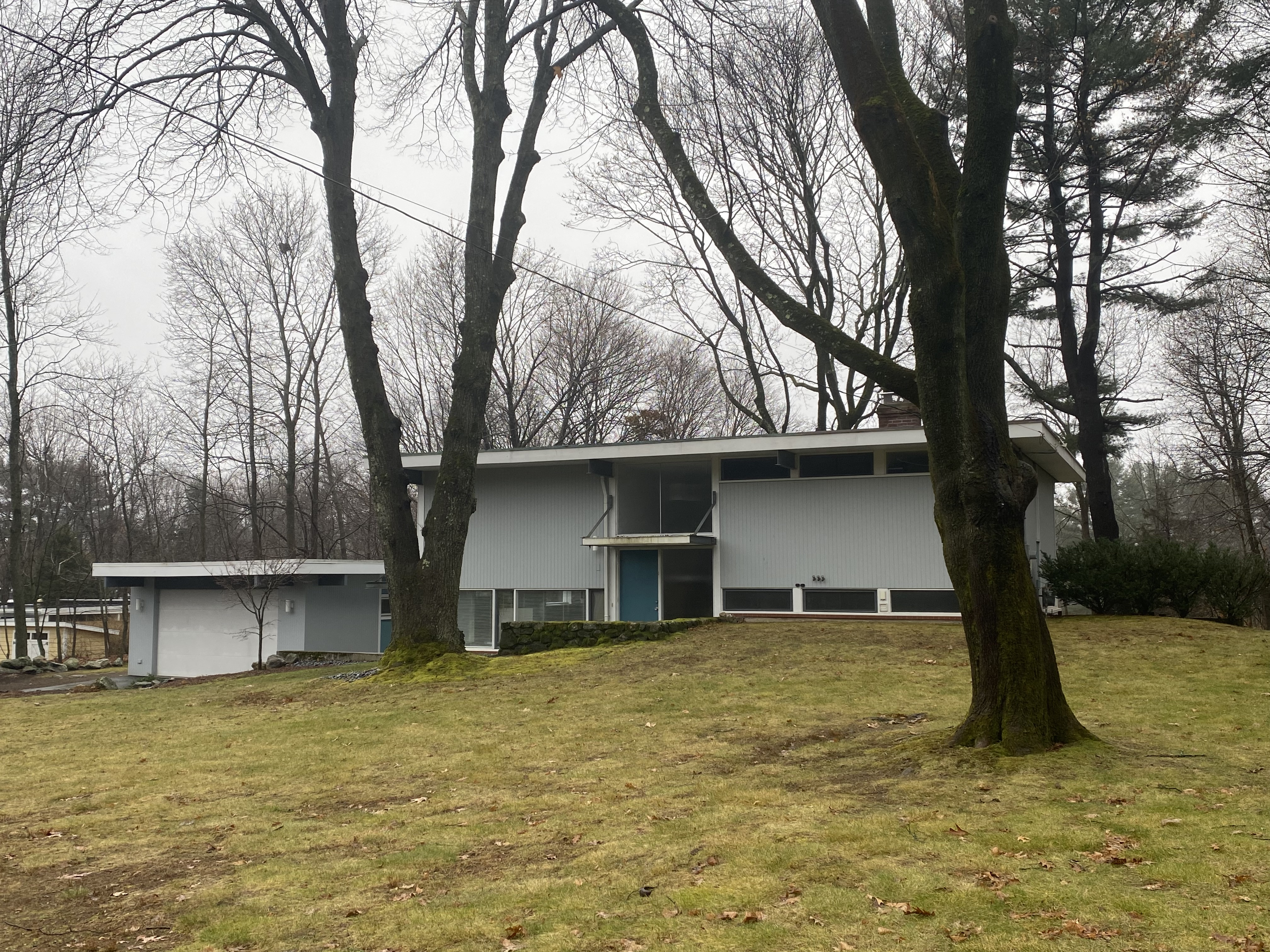
TAC-designed Five Fields flat-roofed house, minimally modified, built in 1955, photographed in 2022

The development was established on the former Cutler dairy farm, near the Waltham line. Stone walls divided the area into five fields. To keep costs down, the houses were originally limited to three standard plans, which allowed the use of common, mass-produced components.

== Bibliography ==
- Denise Dube, "Modern Art: Lexington's Other Historic Home", North Bridge Magazine, Fall 2008, p. 18–26.
- Amanda Kolson Hurley, "The Rise of the Radical Suburbs", Architect, April 9, 2019, adapted from her book Radical Suburbs: Experimental Living on the Fringes of the American City, 2019, ISBN 1948742365
