= Harvard Graduate Center =

Building complex at Harvard University

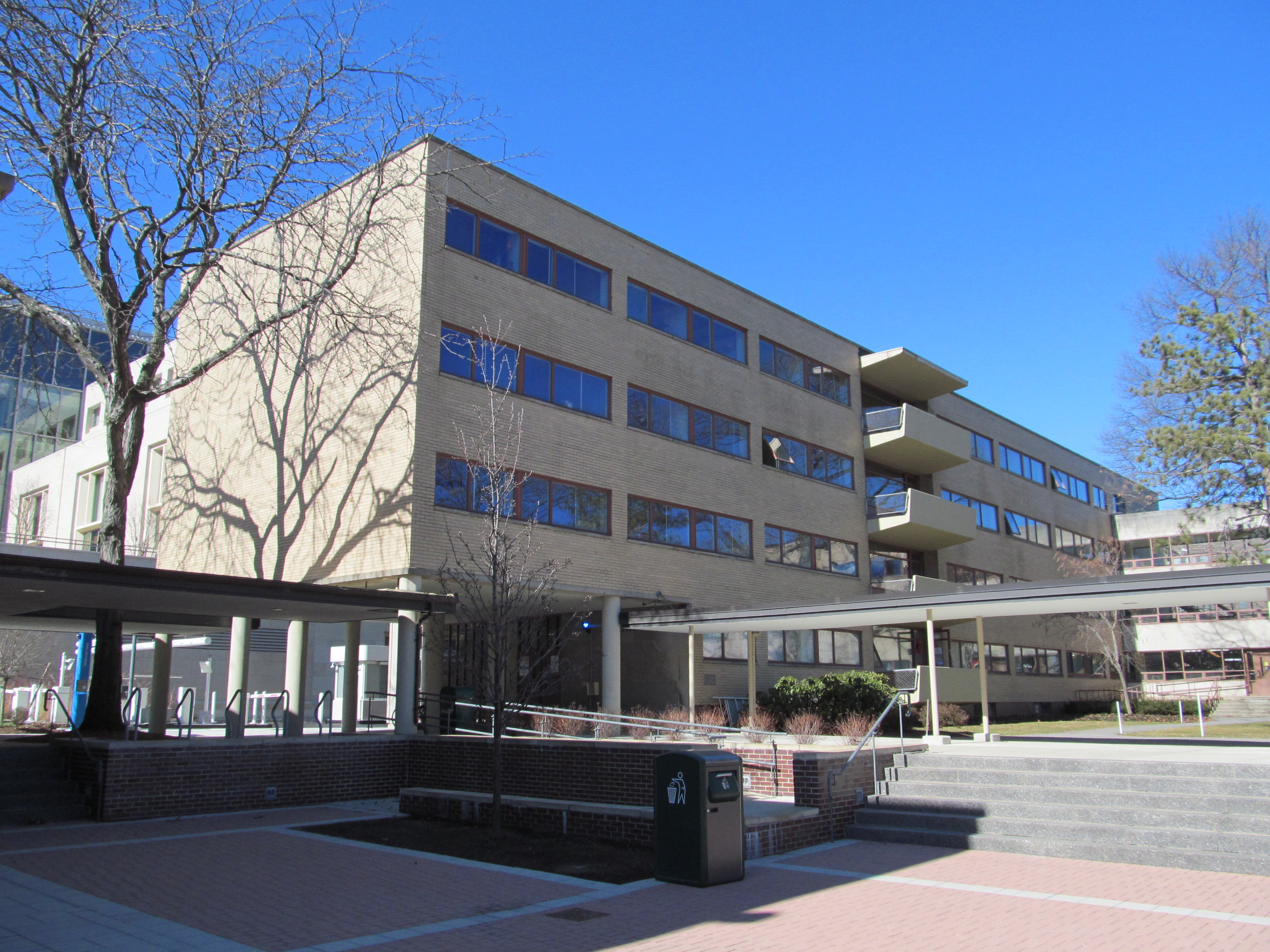
Story Hall

The Harvard Graduate Center, also known as "the Gropius Complex" (including Harkness Commons), is a group of buildings on Harvard University's Cambridge, MA campus designed by The Architects Collaborative in 1948 and completed in 1950. They comprise the first modern building on the campus.

For The Architects Collaborative (TAC), an important modernist firm headed by seven Harvard graduates and Walter Gropius (then chair of the University's Department of Architecture within the Graduate School of Design), the Center was one of their first important works.

The building contains work from avant-garde Surrealist or Bauhaus artists Joan Miró, Josef Albers, Jean Arp and Herbert Bayer. A sculpture by Richard Lippold is in a nearby courtyard.

The buildings are now primarily used as a student center and as a dormitory complex for Harvard Law School.

== Architecture ==
Located at the northern end of campus along Everett Street, the complex takes the traditional form of an academic quad with a modernist aesthetic, putting it at odds with the surrounding buildings. It is made up of seven buildings (five of which are connected by hallways), arranged around two central green spaces. It contains Story Hall, Dane Hall, Holmes Hall, Richards Hall, and Child Hall.

The buildings' façades are yellow brick with a variegated-red brick watercourse and are defined by large ribbon windows.

== Gropius's influence ==
Coming from the Bauhaus, Gropius had been a pioneering innovator of educational architecture and many of his hallmarks can be seen years later in Harkness Commons. The physical Gropius hallmarks – large windows, flowing rooms, floating facades on raised pilotis – are all present here.

Gropius makes clear statements for employing ribbon windows, "Our contemporary architectural conception of an intensified outdoor-indoor relationship through wide window openings and large undivided window panes has ousted the small, cage-like, 'Georgian' window." Further, explaining why TAC designed the structures in a modernist style, Gropius said, "if the college is to be the cultural breeding ground for the coming generation, its attitude should be creative, not imitative."
