= Tower East =

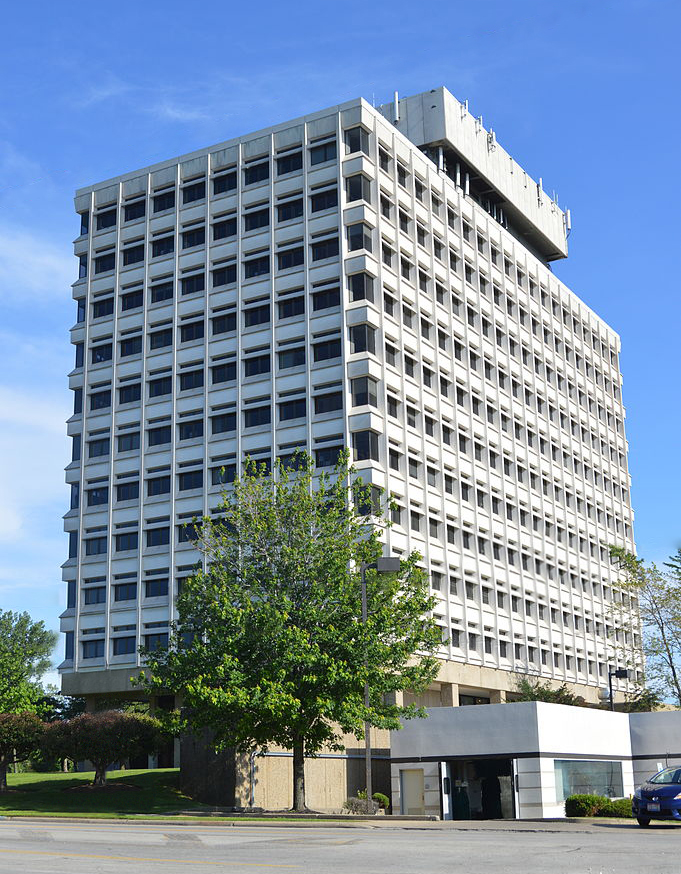
- View from northwest
- Interactive map of the Tower East area

General information
- Status: Completed
- Type: office
- Location: 20600 Chagrin Boulevard, Shaker Heights, Ohio, United States
- Coordinates: 41°27′50″N 81°32′4″W
- Estimated completion: 1969

Height
- Roof: 160 feet (49 m)

Technical details
- Floor count: 12
- Floor area: 173,087 square feet (16,080.3 m^{2})

Design and construction
- Architects: The Architects' Collaborative, Walter Gropius

Other information
- Parking: 600 covered spaces, 55 surface spaces

Tower East is a high-rise office building in Shaker Heights, Ohio. At 160 feet (49 m), it was the tallest building in the city until 2024. Tower East was the last building in the United States designed by architect Walter Gropius. Gropius designed this building during his tenure with The Architect's Collaborative (TAC).

BGK Equities of Santa Fe, New Mexico, purchased the building for $12.68 million in 2000. In 2015, it was sold to E2G, an affiliate of the Equity Engineering Group, Inc.

The building was added to the National Register of Historic Places in 2014.
