= Jane Thompson =

American architect (1927-2016)

Jane Thompson, AICP (June 30, 1927 – August 22, 2016) was an American urbanist, designer and planner, with an international career exceeding forty years.

== Biography ==
Thompson (née Fiske) was educated in the fine and applied arts at Vassar College with graduate work at Bennington College and NYU Institute of Fine Arts, her career has been devoted to the interaction of many facets of applied design. She spent early years in the Museum of Modern Art, becoming acting Assistant Curator in the Department of Architecture. This was followed by positions as Architecture Editor of Interiors Magazine. In 1954, she helped found Industrial Design magazine (later known as International Design) and served as its Editor-in-Chief.

In the 1960s, sponsored by Edgar Kaufmann Jr.'s Foundation, she worked with Walter Gropius on an exploration of the creative educational methods of the original Bauhaus; she became a partner in architect Ben Thompson's retail venture, Design Research, during its 60s expansion from Cambridge to New York to California.

She married Ben Thompson in 1969.

Thompson handled programming and planning at Benjamin Thompson & Associates, Architects and Planners (BTA), working on large urban planning projects, including the Chicago Navy Pier and Grand Central Business Improvement District. She later founded the Thompson Design Group, working with Pratap Talwar on well-received large-scale redevelopment plans, such as for Houston's Buffalo Bayou waterway.

Thompson was active in the International Design Conference in Aspen (IDCA) from 1971 to 2002, as a board member, program chairman, and speaker.

She died at the age of 89 on August 22, 2016.

== Honors ==
Thompson was awarded Institute Honors by the American Institute of Architects in 1994, and in 1998 received the Personal Recognition Award of the Industrial Design Society of America for a lifetime contribution to the field of design in 1996.

For their lifelong support of Finnish Design and way of life, the President of Finland in 2000 named Ben and Jane Thompson each individually as Knight First Class, Order of the Lion of Finland.

In 2010, "Sir Lady Jane" as she was nicknamed (as both a Knight and wife of a Knight) was honored with the Lifetime Achievement Award of the Cooper-Hewitt National Design Museum. Then followed an Honorary PhD from Boston Architectural College, 2011, and the lifetime Award of Honor from Boston Society of Architects in 2012.

== Bibliography ==
- Jane Thompson and Alexandra Lange, Design Research: The Store That Brought Modern Living to American Homes, 2010. ISBN 0-8118-6818-4.
