= Philip Elmer-DeWitt =

American writer and editor

Philip Elmer-DeWitt (born September 8, 1949) is an American writer and editor. He was Time's first computer writer—producing much of the magazine's early coverage of personal computers and the Internet—and for 12 years its science editor. He is currently writing a daily blog about Apple Inc. called Apple 3.0.

== Background ==
Elmer-DeWitt was born in Boston and raised in the Six Moon Hill neighborhood of Lexington, Massachusetts. He graduated from Oberlin College and studied English literature at the University of California, Berkeley and journalism at Columbia University. He worked as a computer programmer and technical writer for Bolt Beranek and Newman in the late '60s, wrote mathematical games for McGraw-Hill in the early 1970s and copy-edited textbooks and scientific monographs for Academic Press in the late '70s.

== Career highlights ==
In 1978, writing as a freelance under the byline Philip Faflick in the Village Voice, Elmer-DeWitt published the first interview with Jean-Michel Basquiat. He joined TIME in 1979 and wrote nearly 500 stories for the magazine, including a dozen cover stories. He launched two sections—Computers and Technology—before being made a senior editor. He edited more than 150 Time cover stories, including the issues that named AIDS researcher David Ho Time's 1996 Man of the Year and Albert Einstein the Person of the Century. His interviews include Steve Jobs, Bill Gates, William Gibson, Elmore Leonard, and Anita Roddick. He was also the author of the controversial Cyberporn cover story. In commenting on that episode, Declan McCullagh excoriated Elmer-DeWitt for multiple "misrepresentations and errors," "logical fallacies," reporting in a "deceptive manner," and "[refusing] to acknowledge the many errors" in the story.

Elmer-DeWitt helped start TIME.com, and organized TIME -sponsored scientific conferences on genetics (2003), obesity (2004) and global health.

In January 2007, he joined Josh Quittner at Business 2.0, another Time Inc. publication, as that magazine's executive editor. In February, he launched a blog called Apple 2.0: Mac news from outside the reality distortion field. When Time Inc. folded Business 2.0 in September 2007, he worked briefly for Fortune magazine before retiring from Time Inc. in May 2008 to write full-time for the web, first for Fortune.com, then for himself. In 2014 he moved to Greenfield, Massachusetts, married the architect Margo Jones and was elected to the city council of his new hometown. He launched Apple 3.0, a blog for Apple investors, on April 1, 2016.

== Select works from Time ==
- The Rio Earth Summit
- Sex in America
- Obesity
- Infertility
- Bards of the Net
- Microsoft
- The Internet
