= Boylston Hall (Harvard University) =

Academic building in Massachusetts, US

Coordinates: 42.373332°N 71.117327°W

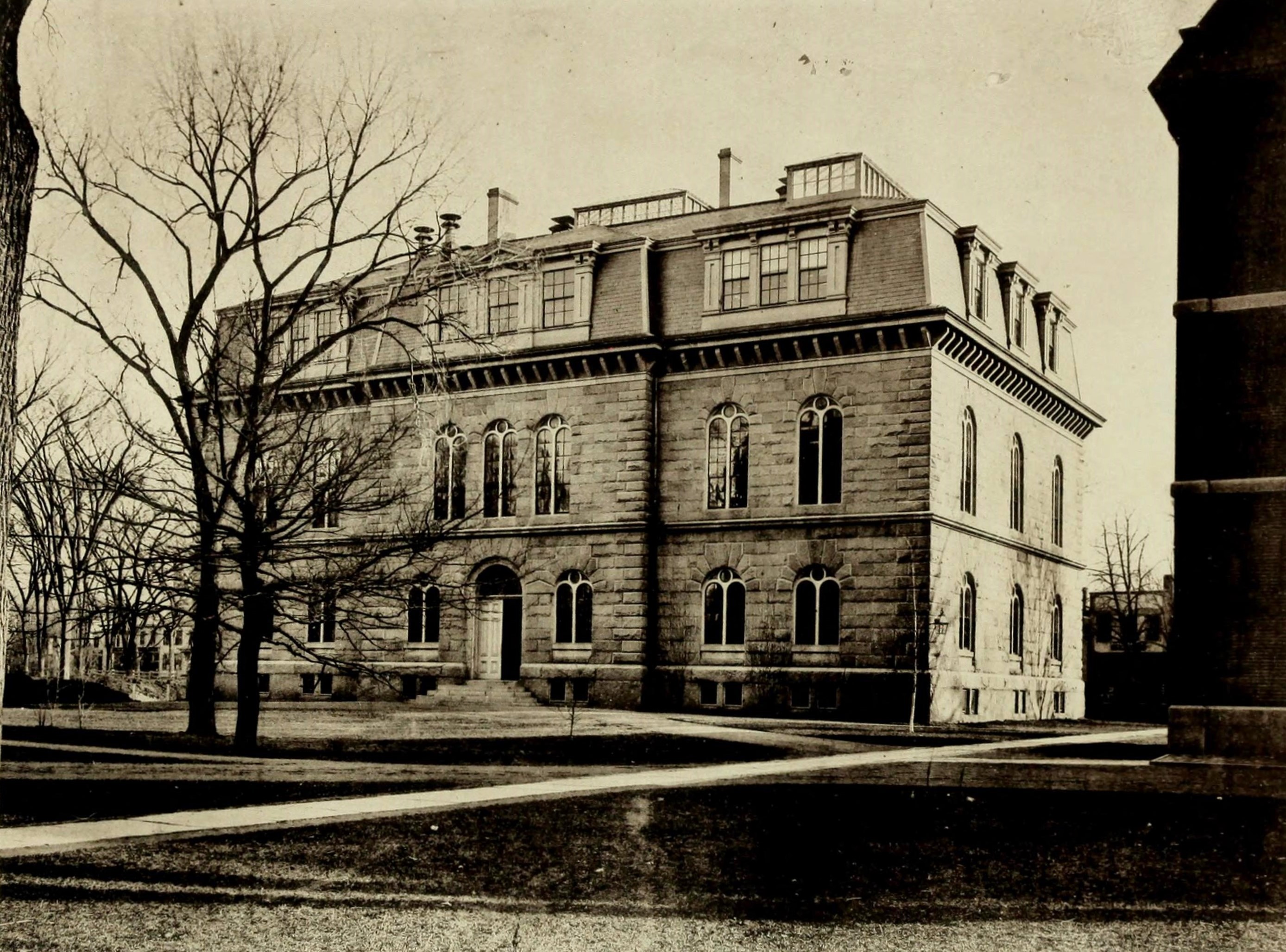
- 1886
- Interactive map of the Boylston Hall area

General information
- Type: Classroom and academic office building
- Location: Harvard Yard, Harvard University
- Year built: 1858, 1871 (addition)
- Renovated: 1959

Design and construction
- Architects: Paul Schulze; Peabody and Stearns (addition)

Renovating team
- Renovating firm: Benjamin Thompson and Associates

Boylston Hall is a Harvard University classroom and academic office building lecture hall near the southwest corner of Harvard Yard, Cambridge, Massachusetts.

Ward Nicholas Boylston had left a bequest to Harvard for the building in 1828. It was built in 1858 to designs in Rundbogenstil by Paul Schulze of Schulze and Schoen. It was clad in stone, as specified by the donor, specifically Rockport granite, and had a hip roof. In 1871, Peabody and Stearns replaced the roof with a mansarded third floor.

It originally served as a chemistry building, with a laboratory and classrooms, and later housed the anatomical museum of Jeffries Wyman, Professor of Comparative Anatomy, who in 1866 became the first curator of the Peabody Museum of Archaeology and Ethnology, as well as a mineralogical collection. In the 20th century, it became the first home of the Harvard-Yenching Institute.

Boylston Hall was gut renovated in 1959 by the architectural firm of Benjamin Thompson and Associates, and is considered an early example of the reuse of sound old buildings ("adaptive reconstruction"), "juxtaposing glass and steel with historic details". It functioned as the university language center. It houses the offices of the Harvard Classics Department.

Its Fong Lecture Hall seats 144.
