= Álvaro Barrera =

Colombian architect

Álvaro Barrera Herrera

Architect specializing in restoration of monuments

Personal details
- Born: 1945
- Education: Universidad de América
- Profession: Architect

Álvaro Barrera Herrera is a Colombian architect, born in 1945, who has done restorative architectural work, both in Colombia and other Latin American countries (including some of Panama's colonial buildings). He oversaw the restoration of Casa Pestagua in Cartagena, Colombia, an 18th-century colonial building constructed for a count near the Plaza Santo Domingo in 2007. A commission for the French actor Claude Pimont. He was also the architect in charge of the restoration of Casa Pombo, a 17th-century building in Cartagena that faces the cathedral, Governor's Residence and overlooking the Plaza Bolivar.

Barrera lives in Cartagena and works with his son Alvaro Andres Barrera Tamayo, who is a manager of the company Barrera & Barrera Architecture and Restoration.
