= Peacock Farm =

Modernist subdivision in Lexington, Massachusetts

- Peacock Farm Historic District
- U.S. National Register of Historic Places
- U.S. Historic district
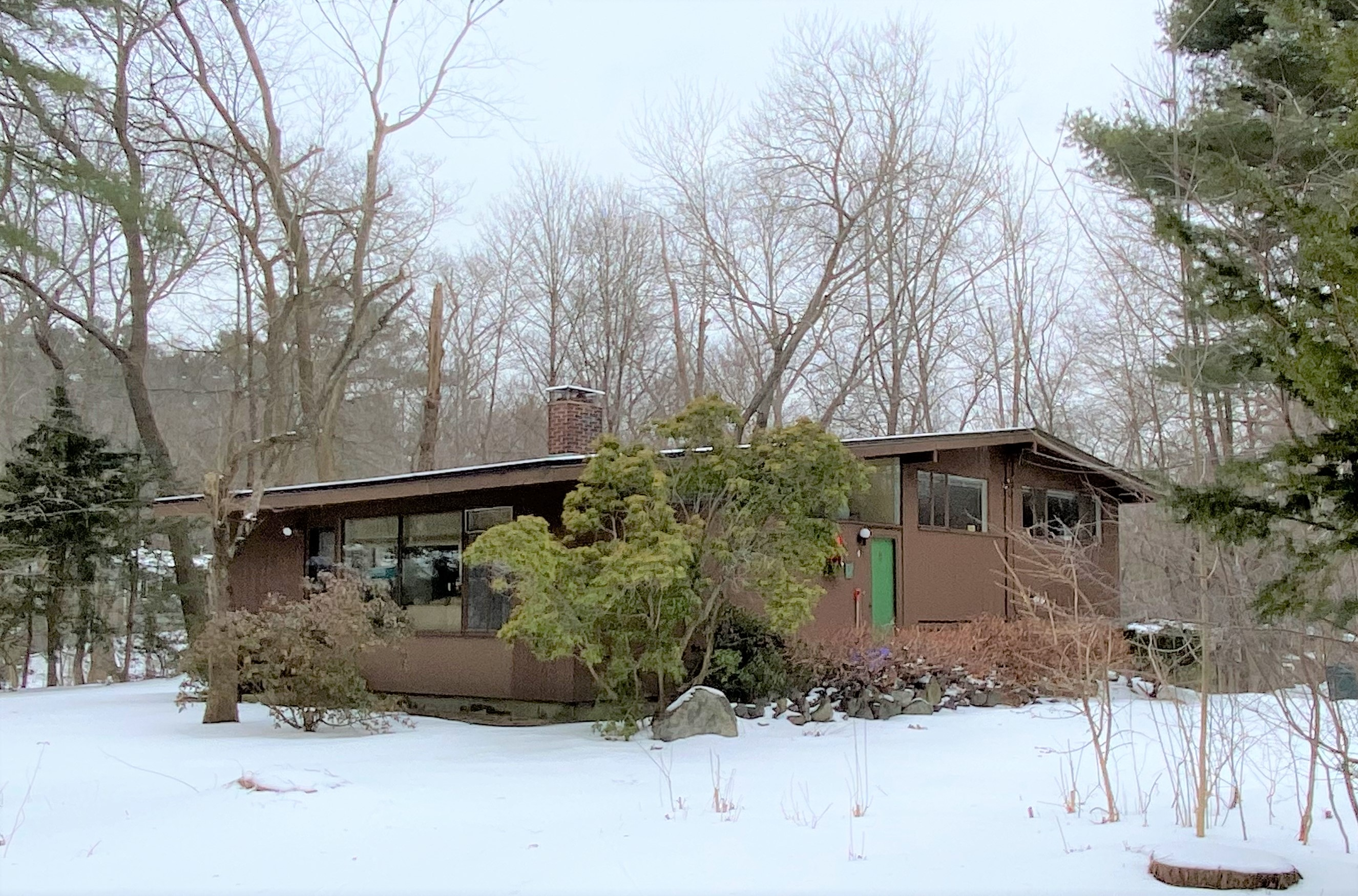
- Typical Peacock Farm House with asymmetrical roof

- Location within Massachusetts Location within the United States
- Location: Lexington, Massachusetts
- Coordinates: 42°25′15″N 71°12′13″W
- NRHP reference No.: 12000949
- Added to NRHP: November 21, 2012

Peacock Farm is a residential neighborhood and historic district of mid-century modern houses in Lexington, Massachusetts.

== Description ==
Peacock Farm is a residential neighborhood located in the southeast corner of Lexington, Massachusetts. Most houses use a standard split-level plan designed by the architectural firm of Comptom & Pierce and were built between the years of 1953 and 1960. Because of siting on the hilly landscape and use of mirror-imaged versions of the plans, the effect is one of diversity but with a common architectural theme. The neighborhood includes a large tract of community-owned land for active and passive recreation. This was the third planned modernist development to have begun in Lexington, after Six Moon Hill, and at about the same time as Five Fields.

The original c.1830 farmhouse and barn still stand and can still be seen today, at the entrance to the modern development. Previous to its purchase for the development, the land had been used for training trotting horses and raising peacocks.

The neighborhood was listed on the National Register of Historic Places in 2012 as the Peacock Farm Historic District.

== Background ==
In 1951, Danforth Compton and Walter Pierce were recent graduates of the Massachusetts Institute of Technology's School of Architecture. At MIT they had been influenced by the ideas of William Wurster, Lawrence Anderson, and the houses built in the area around the same time by Carl Koch. MIT, like the Harvard Graduate School of Design (led at that time by Walter Gropius), represented the trend in design education away from backwards-looking Beaux Arts, to instead embrace the principles of Modernism. As explained by Pierce in a 2011 interview, there was an interest in whether through standardization, homes could be built based on contemporary principles at a price young homeowners could afford.

The newly formed Compton & Pierce firm purchased 42 acres (17 ha) of land that had been a dairy farm in the 19th century, as a place to try out their ideas. By this time, modernist designs for housing were no longer anomalies. The widely-circulated magazine Better Homes and Gardens featured both modernist and traditional plans which subscribers could order from the magazine. However, modern housing designs were most popular in areas with more cosmopolitan tastes such as the suburbs of New York, Boston, and coastal California.

== Architecture ==
Compton & Pierce designed a single-story house with a raised basement, low-pitch roof, and vertical cedar siding that was available in several sizes. The entry was at mid-level, and the houses incorporated large expanses of glass. The house at 4 Peacock Farm Road was built as a demonstration model late in 1951. Pierce said most traditional architects had found the land undesirable for development: "Much of the land gradient was steep, and much of the site was underlaid with ledge. To our eyes, these were assets that could be worked with. The land formed a natural bowl, shielded from the north by the hill and sloping down to the south and southeast, nice attributes in this northern latitude."

== Community and family life ==
Similar to other modernist communities in Lexington, Peacock Farm attracted young professionals and academics. The neighborhood was organized to function as a community with shared land, bylaws, and architectural restrictions. These restrictions were reaffirmed by membership vote in 2001.

== Notable residents ==
- Wesley A. Clark, American physicist and computer scientist, credited with designing the first modern personal computer
- Gerald Holton, American physicist, historian of science, and educator
- Salvator Luria, biologist, winner of the Nobel Prize in Physiology or Medicine in 1969
- Walter Pierce, architect of the development, lived here for 55 years until his death in 2013
- Oliver Selfridge, computer scientist, pioneer in the field of artificial intelligence
- Jill Stein, the 2012, 2016, and 2024 Green Party nominee for president

== See also ==
- National Register of Historic Places listings in Middlesex County, Massachusetts
- Six Moon Hill, an earlier modernist development nearby
