= Jean B. Fletcher =

American architect (1915–1965)

Jean Bodman Fletcher (January 20, 1915 – September 13, 1965) was a pioneering American architect whose career reshaped modern residential and institutional design. As a founding member of The Architects' Collaborative (TAC) in Cambridge, Massachusetts, Fletcher broke gender barriers in a male-dominated field and introduced innovative design concepts that addressed the postwar demand for livable, efficient, and community-oriented spaces. Her work not only revolutionized architectural practice through a collaborative model but also continues to influence contemporary design through its emphasis on functionality and human-centered planning.

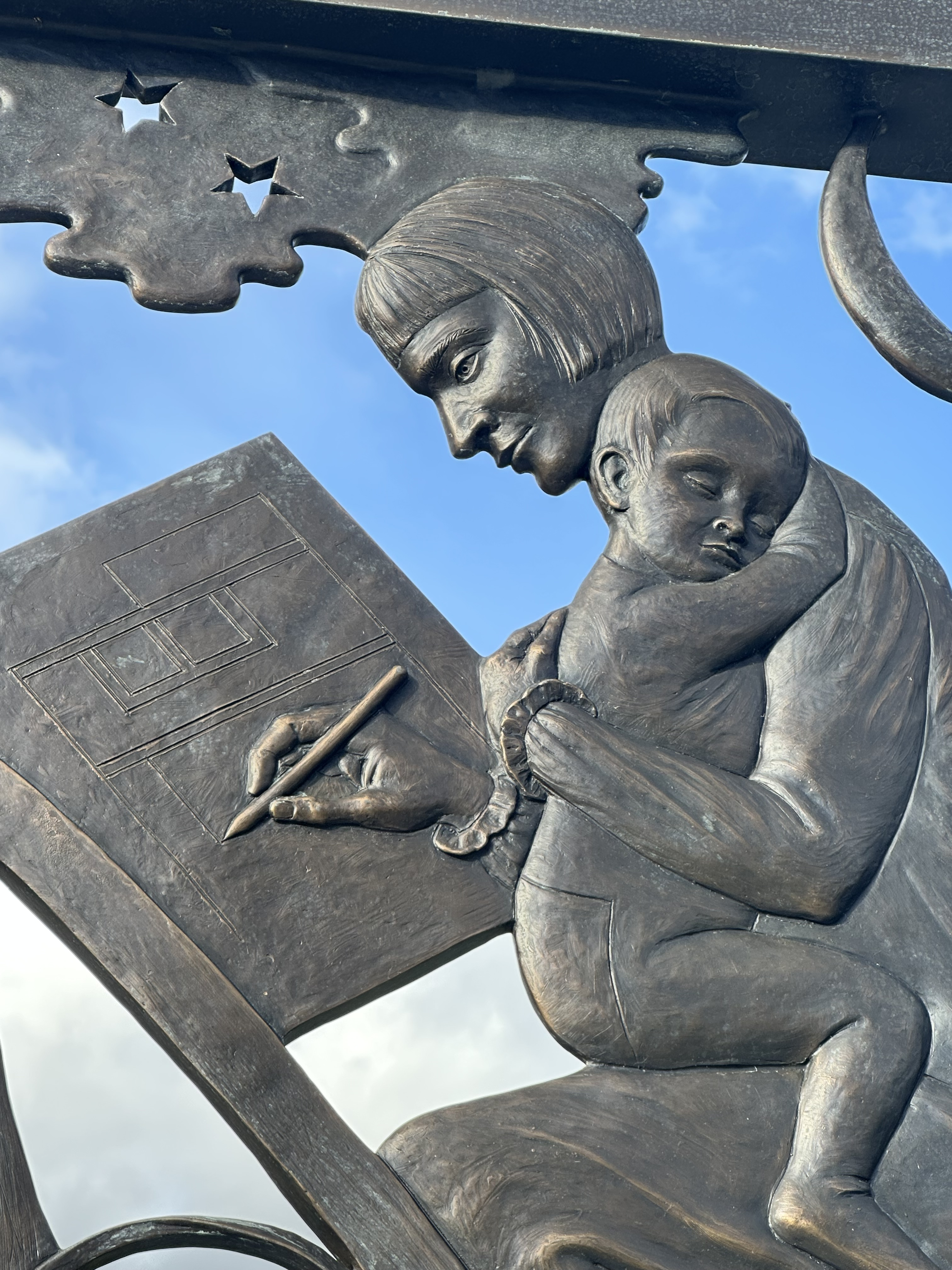
A combined image of Sarah P. Harkness and Jean Bodman Fletcher within the Something Is Being Done! Monument in Lexington, Massachusetts

== Early life and education ==
Born in Boston, Massachusetts, Jean Bodman was the youngest of three children of Maud (Hayden) and Fenimore Lewis Bodman. Her father was a representative for the Powers-Weightman-Rosengarten Company, a chemical manufacturer based in Philadelphia. By 1933, he was running his own company, F.L. Bodman Inc. Her early exposure to art and design fueled her ambition to enter the field of architecture at a time when few women pursued such careers. She attended Smith College, where she was introduced to the fundamentals of design and architecture. Following her time at Smith, she enrolled at the Cambridge School of Architecture and Landscape Architecture for Women—a groundbreaking institution that provided rigorous training exclusively for women.

Her academic journey continued at Harvard University Graduate School of Design, where she honed her technical skills and embraced modernist principles. The education she received at these institutions not only prepared her for the professional challenges ahead but also instilled in her the belief that architecture should serve both practical and social needs. This formative period laid the groundwork for her innovative approach to design, emphasizing simplicity, functionality, and collaboration.

== Early work and competitions ==
In the early stages of her career, Fletcher collaborated closely with her husband, Norman C. Fletcher. Their partnership proved highly fruitful, marked by a series of successful national competitions that launched their reputation in modern architecture. In 1945, their winning entry for the “A House for Cheerful Living” competition—sponsored by Pencil Points and the Pittsburgh Plate Glass Company—garnered critical acclaim for its innovative design. The project featured a prefabricated mechanical core and an H-shaped floor plan that provided both privacy and openness, directly addressing the postwar housing crisis by offering affordable and livable solutions.

Following this success, the Fletchers contributed to the design of the “Motor Traveler’s Hotel” for Architectural Record. This project further exemplified their forward-thinking approach, integrating practical design with community access, and underscored their commitment to solving real-world problems through innovative architecture.

== Collaborative and later projects ==
The establishment of The Architects' Collaborative (TAC) in 1945 marked a turning point in Fletcher’s career and in American architectural practice. Under the mentorship of Walter Gropius, TAC was founded on the principle of collective creativity rather than traditional hierarchical leadership. Fletcher was instrumental in developing this collaborative model, which allowed diverse talents to merge into integrated design solutions. This team-based approach challenged the conventional “architect as lone genius” narrative and promoted shared responsibility in the design process.

Within TAC, Fletcher led numerous projects that addressed a wide range of societal needs. One notable project was the Smith College Dormitory, which not only won first prize in a national competition but also demonstrated her commitment to creating environments that fostered social interaction and personal growth. Her work on residential projects—such as the Fletcher House at Six Moon Hill and the Five Fields Housing Development in Lexington, Massachusetts—pioneered designs that encouraged community interaction and flexibility in living arrangements. These projects anticipated modern urban planning trends that emphasize mixed-use spaces and communal living environments.

Fletcher also made significant contributions to institutional architecture. She played a key role in designing the Putterham Branch Library in Brookline, Massachusetts, and the Coolidge Pavilion at the Peter Bent Brigham Hospital in Boston. Perhaps her most influential project was the Boston Children's Hospital, which integrated patient care with family accommodations and supportive facilities such as a Children’s Inn. This project redefined healthcare architecture by addressing both medical and social needs, demonstrating that thoughtfully designed spaces can enhance the quality of life for patients and their families.

== Death ==
Jean Bodman Fletcher died of breast cancer on September 13, 1965, at the age of 50. Despite her early passing, her legacy endures through the lasting impact of her work and the continuing influence of the collaborative model she helped pioneer. Her innovations in residential, educational, and healthcare architecture remain influential, inspiring new generations of architects to prioritize functionality, community engagement, and teamwork in their designs.
