= John C. Harkness =

American architect

John Cheesman Harkness
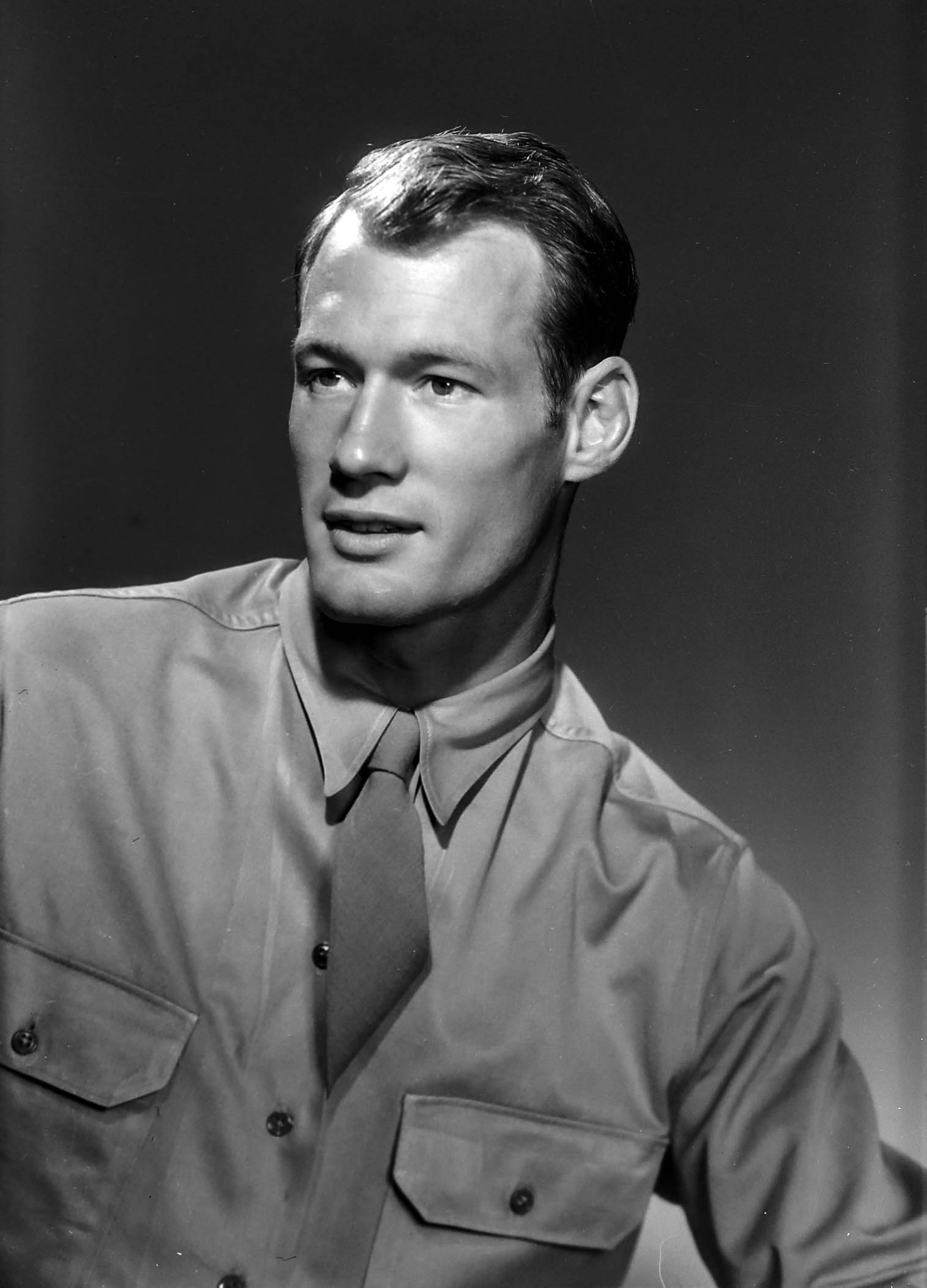
- Harkness, circa 1940s
- Born: November 30, 1916; New York City, New York, U.S.
- Died: November 28, 2016 (aged 99); Vinalhaven, Maine, U.S.
- Education: Harvard University
- Spouse: Sarah Pillsbury (m. 1941; died 2013)

John Cheesman "Chip" Harkness FAIA (November 30, 1916 – November 28, 2016) was an American architect who was a founder and partner of The Architects Collaborative (TAC) in Cambridge, Massachusetts with Walter Gropius and six other architects. He was a part of TAC from its inception in 1945 until the firm's demise in 1995.

Chip Harkness was born in New York City to architect Albert Harkness and was educated at the Harvard Graduate School of Design graduating in 1941. He worked briefly for the New York firm Skidmore, Owings & Merrill (SOM), but as a conscientious objector during World War II, he refused to work on war-related projects. Because this was the majority of SOM's work at the time, he was let go. He was also briefly in the American Field Service.

In 1945, shortly after the founding of TAC, he and his wife Sarah P. Harkness joined forces with another architectural couple, Norman and Jean Fletcher (also founders of TAC) to submit entries for the Smith College dormitories competition hosted by Progressive Architecture magazine. The Harknesses and Fletchers came in second place. One of the earliest projects for TAC was the creation of the Six Moon Hill neighborhood in Lexington, Massachusetts, which featured many innovations in architecture, landscape planning and community development. The house he shared with Sarah and their growing family included radiant heat in the floor, skylights that were a reuse of the technology for creating bomber turrets, an open plan in which the kitchen was directly connected to living areas and large expanses of glass. All of the TAC partners other than Gropius lived in Six Moon Hill. This project was followed a few years later by the Five Fields residential development.

During his work at TAC, Harkness was involved in designing many public and private school buildings throughout New England, as well as urban design jobs such as Jubail New Town in Saudi Arabia, a city for 400,000 inhabitants. Wayland High School in Wayland, Massachusetts received considerable attention for its "campus" style and new methods of instruction. He was elected to the National Academy of Design in 1971 as an associate member, and became a full academician in 1994.

Harkness became Harvard wrestling's first NCAA national champion on March 26, 1938, when he defeated Oklahoma's Marshall Word for the 175 lbs. title. Harkness, the Crimson captain that season, also won the EIWA title and was named the EIWA's Most Outstanding Wrestler.

Harkness died on November 28, 2016, two days short of his 100th birthday.
