= The Architects Collaborative =

American architectural firm

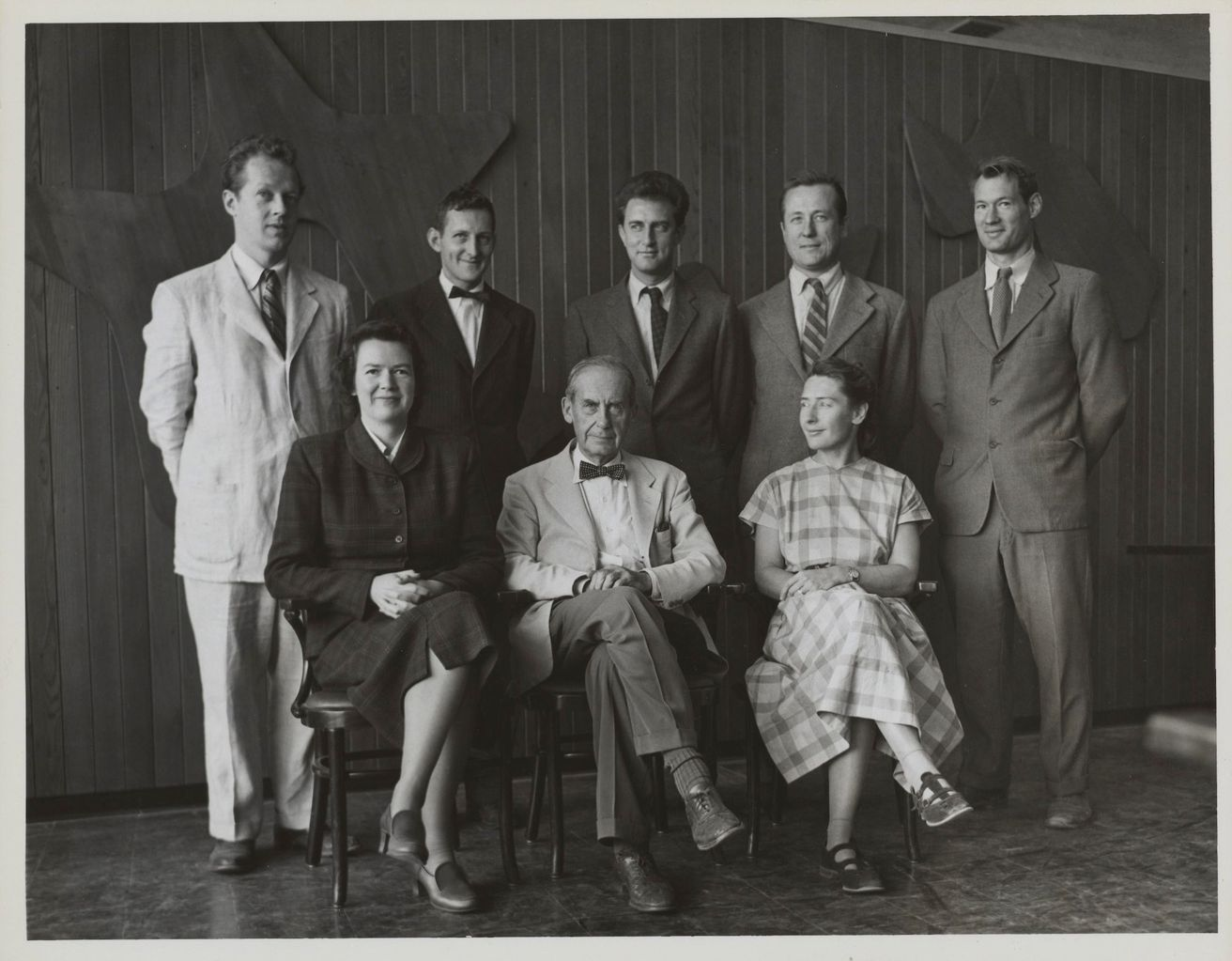
- The Architects Collaborative (TAC) founding members from left to right: Robert S. McMillan, Norman C. Fletcher, Benjamin Thompson, Louis A. McMillen, John C. Harkness, Jean B. Fletcher, Walter Gropius, Sarah Harkness

Practice information
- Founders: Norman C. Fletcher, Jean B. Fletcher, Walter Gropius, John C. Harkness, Sarah P. Harkness, Robert S. McMillan, Louis A. McMillen, Benjamin C. Thompson.
- Founded: 1945
- Dissolved: 1995
- Location: Cambridge, Massachusetts

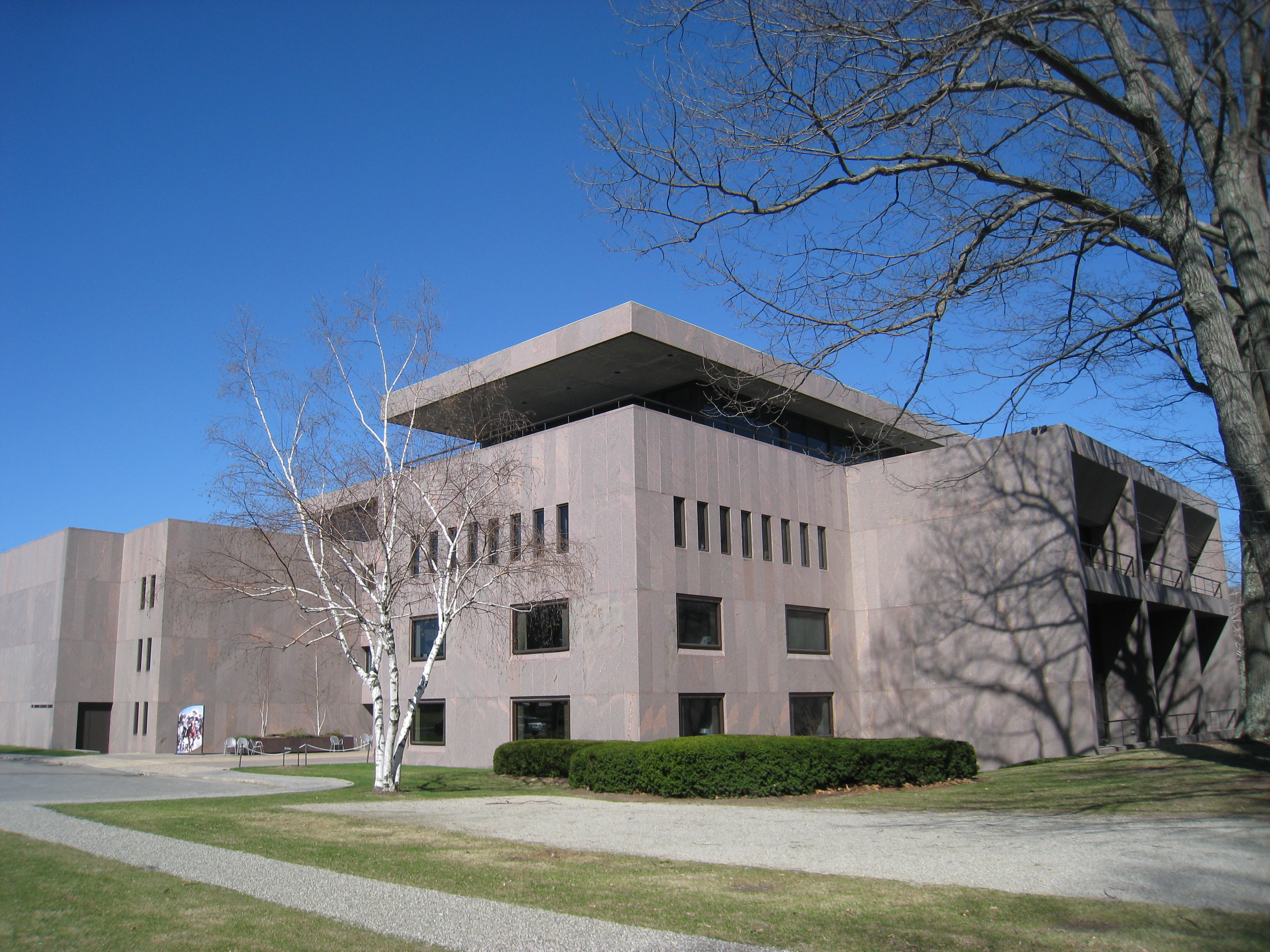
Manton Research Center at Clark Art Institute, designed by The Architects' Collaborative in 1973

The Architects Collaborative (TAC) was an American architectural firm formed by eight architects that operated between 1945 and 1995 in Cambridge, Massachusetts. The founding members were Norman C. Fletcher (1917–2007), Jean B. Fletcher (1915–1965), John C. Harkness (1916–2016), Sarah P. Harkness (1914–2013), Robert S. McMillan (1916–2001), Louis A. McMillen (1916–1998), Benjamin C. Thompson (1918–2002), and Walter Gropius (1883–1969). TAC created many successful projects, and was well respected for its broad range of designs, being considered one of the most notable firms in post-war modernism.

== History ==
Norman Fletcher, Louis McMillen, Robert McMillan, and Ben Thompson first laid the conceptual foundation for what became the Architects Collaborative while they were classmates at Yale University, where they discussed forming "the World Collaborative", which would be an ideal office combining painting, sculpture, and architecture.

Upon graduation, Norman Fletcher worked with John Harkness during the war at Skidmore, Owings & Merrill in New York, and later, John Harkness worked with Jean Fletcher for Saarinen and Swanson in Bloomfield Hills, Michigan. Jean Fletcher and Sarah Harkness had both studied at the Cambridge School of Architecture and Landscape Architecture.

This group of friends were committed to forming a collaborative practice. To help them navigate the professional world and lend notability to the firm, they sought to add a senior practitioner. John Harkness pitched the idea of joining the Architects' Collaborative to Walter Gropius, who had asked Harkness to teach a master's class at Harvard. Gropius agreed and became the eighth member of the group. Other principals came to include Richard Brooker, Alex Cvijanović, Herbert Gallagher, William Geddis, Roland Kluver, Peter Morton and H. Morse Payne Jr.

== Design philosophy and organization ==
The idea of collaboration was the basis of TAC. In the book about TAC she co-authored with Gropius, Sarah Harkness wrote that "There are two ways to go--towards competition or towards collaboration. A contest can be stimulating, but as a way of life competition is wasteful."

In a 2023 interview, Perry Neubauer who joined the firm in 1965, said "It was a different ballgame when I came up to Cambridge and worked at TAC. We would sit in a design meeting and grab the pencil out of each other’s hands. ”Hey, what do you think about this?” Anybody could say anything. You weren't going to dispute things with Gropius, probably, But everyone thought they could offer an opinion. That was the strength of TAC."

As described by McMillen, conforming to the ideal of anonymity helped bind the office together. It was carried out in that an entire group of architects have their input on a project, rather than putting an emphasis on individualism. There would be a "partner-in-charge", who would meet with clients and have the final decision of what goes into the design. Originally, each of the eight partners would hold weekly meetings on a Thursday to discuss their projects and be open to design input and ideas. However, as the firm grew larger there were many more people on a team and it was more difficult to consolidate into one group. Therefore, many other "groups" of architects within the firm were formed and carried out the same original objective. The position of the firm's president would be rotated amongst the senior partners.

== Work ==
TAC's initial work consisted of residential projects, mainly single-family houses. The most notable design was Six Moon Hill in Lexington, Massachusetts, a community dwelling in which several of the houses were the residences of the founding partners, excluding Gropius. Another one of TAC's specialties in this period was school buildings, which included many elementary and secondary public schools throughout Massachusetts and New England. TAC also designed many buildings for universities, among which was the Harvard Graduate Center, a small campus of dormitories and a building devoted to student activities.

King Faisal II had a bidding process for the redesign of the city of Bagdad in order to turn into a busting urban center, the process included many popular postwar architects including Frank Lloyd Wright, Walter Gropius, Le Corbusier, Josep Lluís Sert, and Alvar Aalto. Gropius, alongside The Architects Collaborative designed and planned the entire campus for the University of Baghdad, from 1958 to 1963. Only a few of Gropius' designs survived into the campus' final iteration: the faculty tower, a few classroom buildings, and the Open Mind monument. The project was met with both financial and political difficulties over several years which hampered a timely completion.

TAC's other work included many corporate, government, and recreational buildings in both the United States and internationally.

In its initial decades, TAC's architecture was mainly in the International Style, early examples of which had been created by Gropius and his colleagues at the Bauhaus and elsewhere. Starting in the 1970s, TAC's style largely shifted from modernism to postmodernism, which was generally coming into favor in the architectural field. Their postmodernist works included Copley Place, an enclosed shopping mall with a hotel, offices, and formerly a cinema; Heritage on the Garden, an upscale residential-retail complex facing the Boston Public Garden; and the Flagship Wharf Condominiums at the Charlestown Navy Yard.

== Later years and demise ==
As the firm's staff increased and the scope of the projects became more complex, an office in Rome was opened in the 1960s, which oversaw projects primarily in Europe and the Middle East. This was followed by the opening of an office in San Francisco in 1985.

Gropius was a part of TAC until his death in 1969 at age 86. The group continued on, but the firm fell into financial problems in the 1980s. This was largely due to TAC being unable to pay expenses owed to various financial institutions and other corporations. Among other things, the firm had been losing money in unbuilt designs, especially in the Middle East. TAC declared bankruptcy and closed in April 1995. In response, The Massachusetts Committee for the Preservation of Architectural Records, Harvard University, the Massachusetts Institute of Technology, and the Boston Architectural Center worked together to retrieve TAC's drawings and records. The firm's collection of approximately 100,000 slides is held in the Special Collection of Frances Loeb Library at the Harvard Graduate School of Design. The remainder of the firm's archive, including drawings, specifications, models, presentation boards, microfilm, and additional archival materials are in the collection of the MIT Museum. While the innovative process the TAC architects believed so deeply was carried out successfully, it did not become the norm for architectural firms.

== Legacy ==
For the most part TAC functioned as a team rather than on an individual basis, which was considered a unique method of architectural practice, which reflected Gropius' philosophy of working collaboratively with others when he was a Bauhaus instructor in Germany prior to TAC.

== Notable works ==
Years	Location	Notes
1947–1950	Six Moon Hill; Moon Hill Rd, Lexington, Massachusetts	
1951–1959	Five Fields; Lexington, Massachusetts	A neighborhood featuring plots of land for use by the community.
1949	Harvard Graduate Center; Cambridge, Massachusetts	
1955	Littleton Junior-Senior High School; Littleton, Massachusetts	In use as a high school, then middle school, from about 1957–2008. Demolished in 2008.
1958–1963	University of Baghdad; Baghdad, Iraq	The largest project with work by Walter Gropius, as of 2012 this school serves 30,000 students in 273 buildings.
1958–1963	Pan-American World Airways Building; New York, New York	with Emery Roth & Sons.
1957	Walter-Gropius-Haus; Händelallee 1–9, Berlin, Germany	also known as "Gropiushaus“
1960	Wayland High School; Wayland, Massachusetts	demolished 2012.
1961	Embassy of the United States, Athens, Greece	with consulting architect Pericles A. Sakellarios.
1961–1966	John Fitzgerald Kennedy Office Building; Boston, Massachusetts	
1962	Parkside Elementary School; Columbus, Indiana	
1965	Rosenthal Porcelain Factory; Selb, Bavaria, Germany	
1967	IPS Building; Nairobi, Kenya	
1969	Tower East; Shaker Heights, Ohio	
1973	AIA Headquarters Building; Washington, D.C.	
1973	Amathus Beach Hotel; Limassol, Cyprus	The first hotel designed by TAC (in collaboration with the Cyprus-based firm Colakides and Associates).
1974	Health Sciences Expansion; University of Minnesota, Minneapolis, Minnesota	
1976	San Francisco Tower; Kansas City, Missouri	
1976–1979	Bauhaus Archive; Berlin, Germany	
1979–1984	Corporate Headquarters for CIGNA; Bloomfield, Connecticut	
1972	Shirley S. Okerstrom Fine Arts Building; Traverse City, Michigan	
1973	Manton Research Center, Clark Art Institute, Williamstown, Massachusetts	
1975	Jubail Industrial Complex, Jubail, Saudi Arabia	An Industrial town and housing development joint project with Bechtel Group providing engineering.
1984	O'Neill Library; Boston College, Chestnut Hill, Massachusetts	
1984	Copley Place; Boston, Massachusetts	A mixed-use retail, cinema, hotel, office building development
1988	Heritage on the Garden; Boston, Massachusetts	a condominium facing the Public Garden
1982–1986	Kuwait Foundation for the Advancement of Sciences, Sharq area, Kuwait	
1989	Snell Library; Northeastern University, Boston, Massachusetts	
1990	Flagship Wharf Condominiums; Charlestown Navy Yard, Massachusetts	

== See also ==
- The Architects Collaborative, 1945-1965
