= Walter Pierce (architect) =

American architect

- Born: February 10, 1920; Brooklyn, New York
- Died: February 27, 2013 (aged 93); Lexington, Massachusetts
- Education: Virginia Polytechnic Institute; Massachusetts Institute of Technology
- Occupation: Architect
- Spouse: Marianne Fisker
- Children: Stefan (son); Christian (son)

Walter Smith Pierce (February 10, 1920 – February 27, 2013) was an American modernist architect, best known for designing post-World War II suburban homes.

== Early life and career ==
Pierce was born in Brooklyn, New York and graduated from the Virginia Polytechnic Institute in 1941. He served in the United States Army Corps of Engineers during World War II doing reconstruction work in Europe. After the war, Pierce studied architecture at the Massachusetts Institute of Technology. Following graduation, he formed a partnership with a former classmate, Danforth Compton. In 1951, Pierce and Compton purchased 45 acres of land in Lexington, Massachusetts which had once served as a dairy farm and peacock sanctuary. They began creating a subdivision of affordable but aesthetically pleasing split-level homes that were intended to improve people's lives by "improving their relationship to the land". The houses were designed to accommodate the wooded and hilly terrain on which they were constructed. The subdivision, which was built between 1952 and 1958, was named Peacock Farm.

Pierce's designs feature open floor plans, asymmetrical roofs, walls of glass, and raised basements. Seven homes had been built at the time of Danforth Compton's death in 1955. When construction was finished in 1958, the Peacock Farm subdivision consisted of 52 split-level homes selling for $20,000. Pierce formed a new firm in 1964, producing designs for custom homes, public schools and the Marine Biological Laboratory at Woods Hole, Massachusetts. He has said that he was influenced by modern Californian design as well as Japanese and Scandinavian architectural styles.

His split-level design took first place in the 1957 standard-plan competition held by the American Institute of Architects and Better Homes and Gardens. In November 2012, Peacock Farm was added to the National Register of Historic Places as an early example of Modernist architecture. Pierce was a fellow of the American Institute of Architects.

== Personal life ==
Pierce was married to Marianne Fisker until her death in 2006. They had two sons, Stefan and Christian. Pierce lived in the Peacock Farm house he designed for 55 years.
