= Norman C. Fletcher =

American architect (1917–2007)

Norman Collings Fletcher (December 8, 1917 – May 31, 2007) was an American architect who was a co-founder and partner of the architectural firm The Architects Collaborative (TAC), working there from 1945 until the firm's demise in 1995. His wife was Jean B. Fletcher.

Fletcher was born in Providence, Rhode Island. He attended the Yale School of Architecture in 1940, and in the same year joined the National Council of Architectural Registration Boards. In 1943, he worked for the firm Skidmore, Owings & Merrill until leaving them in 1944 to work for Eliel Saarinen's firm Saarinen, Swanson & Associates. In 1945, he joined forces with Walter Gropius and several other architects to establish The Architects Collaborative (TAC). He and Gropius worked on many projects together, notably the Boston Back Bay Center (1953) and Hua Tung University (1948). Neither project was ever built.

From 1963 to 1965, he was the vice president of the Boston Society of Architects. In 1970, he was elected into the National Academy of Design as an Associate member, and became a full Academician in 1994.

Norman Fletcher lived in a residential development called Six Moon Hill in Lexington, Massachusetts, which was designed by TAC.
