= Robert S. McMillan (architect) =

American architect

Robert Sensman McMillan (April 4, 1916 - March 14, 2001 ) was an architect who was one of the founders of The Architects Collaborative. He was a part of TAC its founding date in 1945 until he left in 1963. Following his departure from TAC, he started his own firm Robert S. McMillan Associates, which concentrated mainly on projects in Africa and south-west Asia. McMillan was educated at Yale University School of Architecture.
