= Louis A. McMillen =

American architect

Louis Albert McMillen (October 24, 1916 – May 4, 1998) was an American architect who was one of the original founding partners of The Architects Collaborative with Walter Gropius and six other architects. McMillen was part of TAC from its founding in 1945 until its demise in 1995.

== Career ==
McMillen attended Yale University School of Architecture in 1940 and received a Bachelor of Fine Arts degree. Soon afterward, he attended Harvard Graduate School of Design from 1941 to 1945 and was given a Bachelor of Architecture. From 1942-1945, he served as lieutenant in the United States Navy during World War II. Following his discharge from the military, he was employed by an architectural firm Brown, Lawford + Forbes for only 5 months, and later in that same year he joined several of his Yale and Harvard classmates to form TAC with Gropius. For the fifty-year lifespan of TAC, he played an important part in the collaborative process.

== Personal life ==
From birth until age 8, McMillen lived in Brazil then moved to New York City where his mother—Drury McMillen—founded an interior design firm that continues to operate today. After graduating from St. George's prep school in 1935, he entered the Yale University School of Architecture. In 1937 he bought a Ford Model A Special from his friend Frank Griswold and began competing in events in the Automobile Racing Club of America.

=== Death ===
In 1998, McMillen suffered a massive stroke and died on May 4 at the age of 81.
