= Robert T. Coles House and Studio =

Historic house in New York, United States

- U.S. National Register of Historic Places
- U.S. Historic district – Contributing property
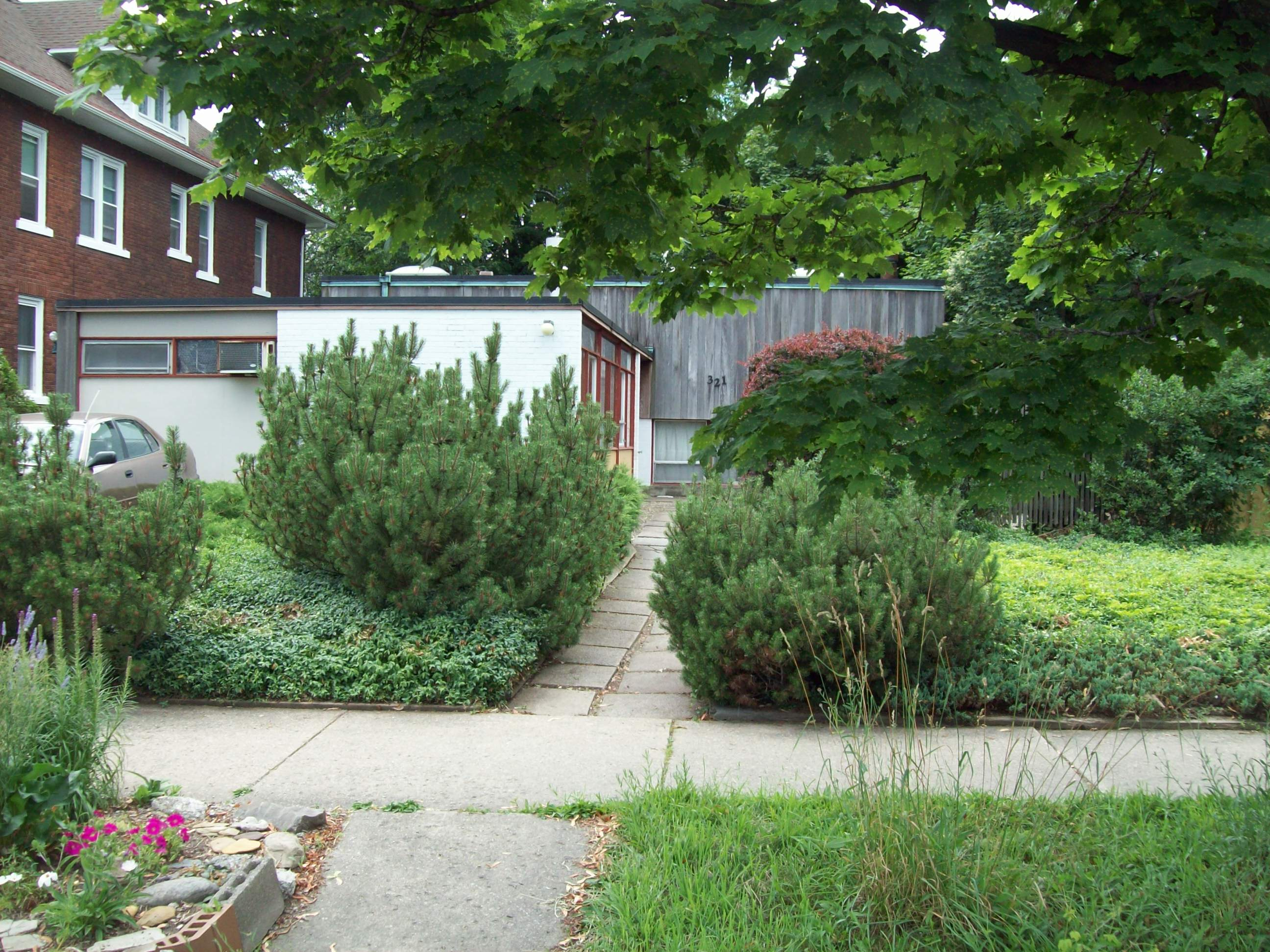
- Robert T. Coles House and Studio, July 2011

- Location within New York Location within the United States
- Location: 321 Humboldt Pkwy., Buffalo, New York
- Coordinates: 42°55′30″N 78°50′50″W
- Area: 0.18 acres (0.073 ha)
- Built: 1961
- Architect: Coles, Robert T.
- Architectural style: Modern
- NRHP reference No.: 11000594
- Added to NRHP: August 30, 2011

Robert T. Coles House and Studio is a historic home and architectural design studio located at Buffalo in Erie County, New York. It was designed and built in 1961, by locally prominent African American architect Robert T. Coles. It consists of two prefabricated rectangular units arranged in an "L"-shape in the Modern style. The studio unit is a single story and living unit is two levels. It has post-and-beam construction with a variety of pre-fabricated, non-structural panels and sliding glass door units. Coles once worked for the Techbuilt company under Carl Koch and the design of this dwelling reflects that experience.

It was listed on the National Register of Historic Places in 2011. It is located in the Hamlin Park Historic District.
