= Milton Milstein =

American architect (1910–1993)

- Born: May 17, 1910; New York City
- Died: May 9, 1993 (aged 82); New Haven, Connecticut
- Occupation: Architect
- Awards: Fellow, American Institute of Architects (1968)
- Practice: Milton Milstein; Milton Milstein & Associates; Milstein, Wittek, Davis & Hamilton; Milstein, Wittek, Davis & Associates; Milstein, Wittek, Davis & Associates PC; Milstein, Wittek & Associates PC; Milstein Kwapisz & Associates PC

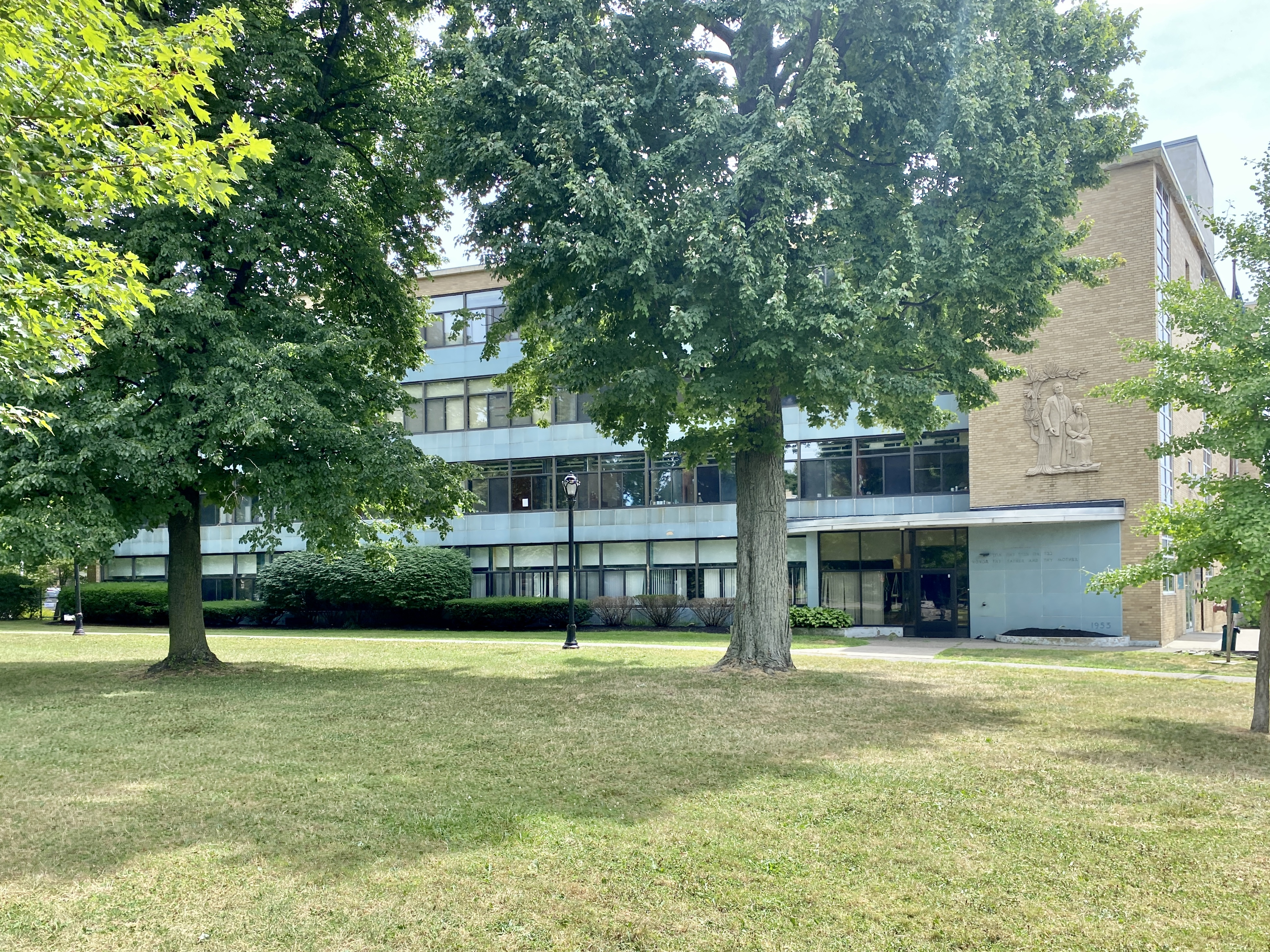
The former Rosa Coplon Jewish Home and Infirmary in Buffalo, New York, designed by Milton Milstein and completed in 1954.

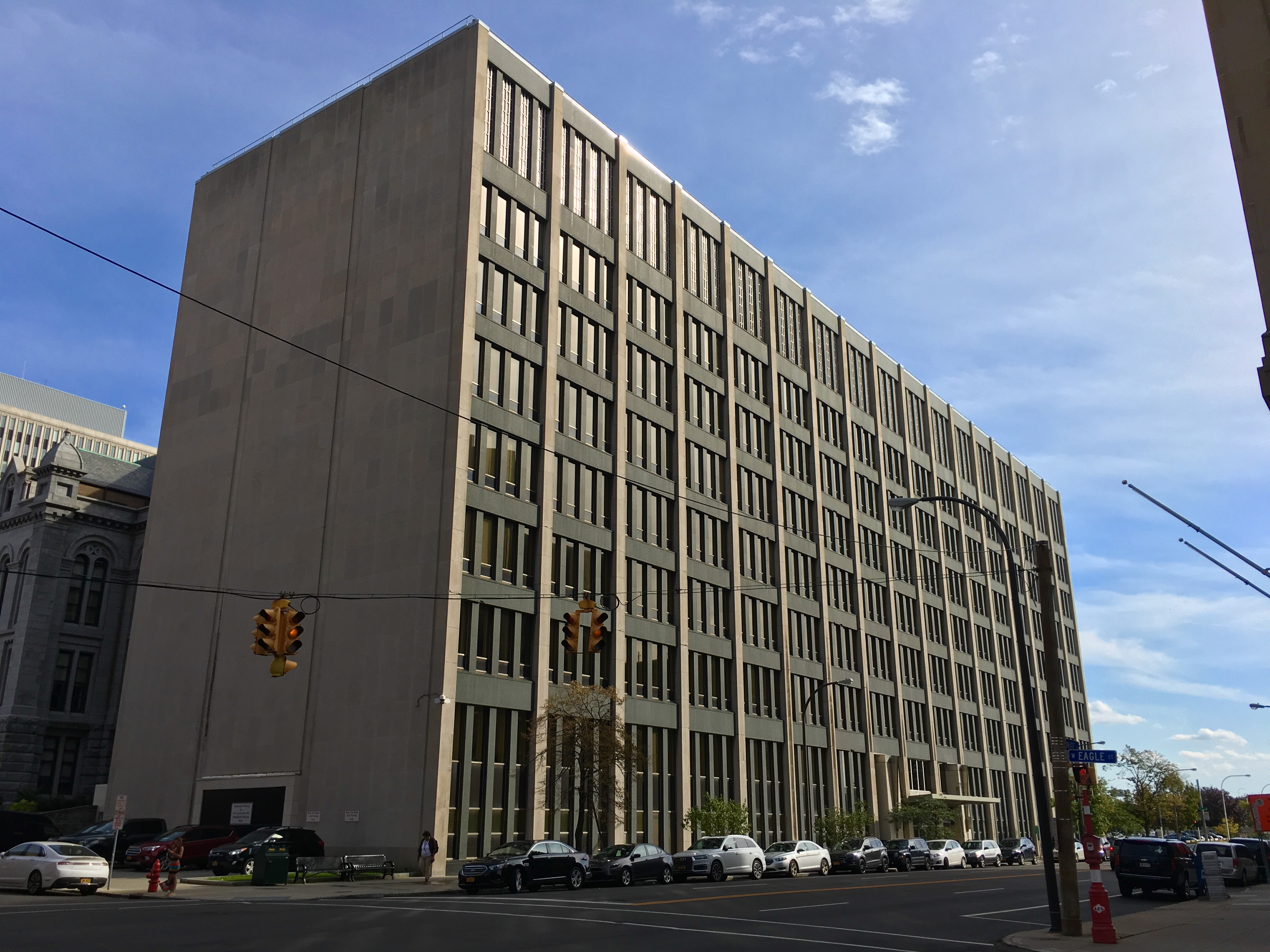
The Erie County Court Building in Buffalo, New York, designed by Milton Milstein & Associates and completed in 1964.

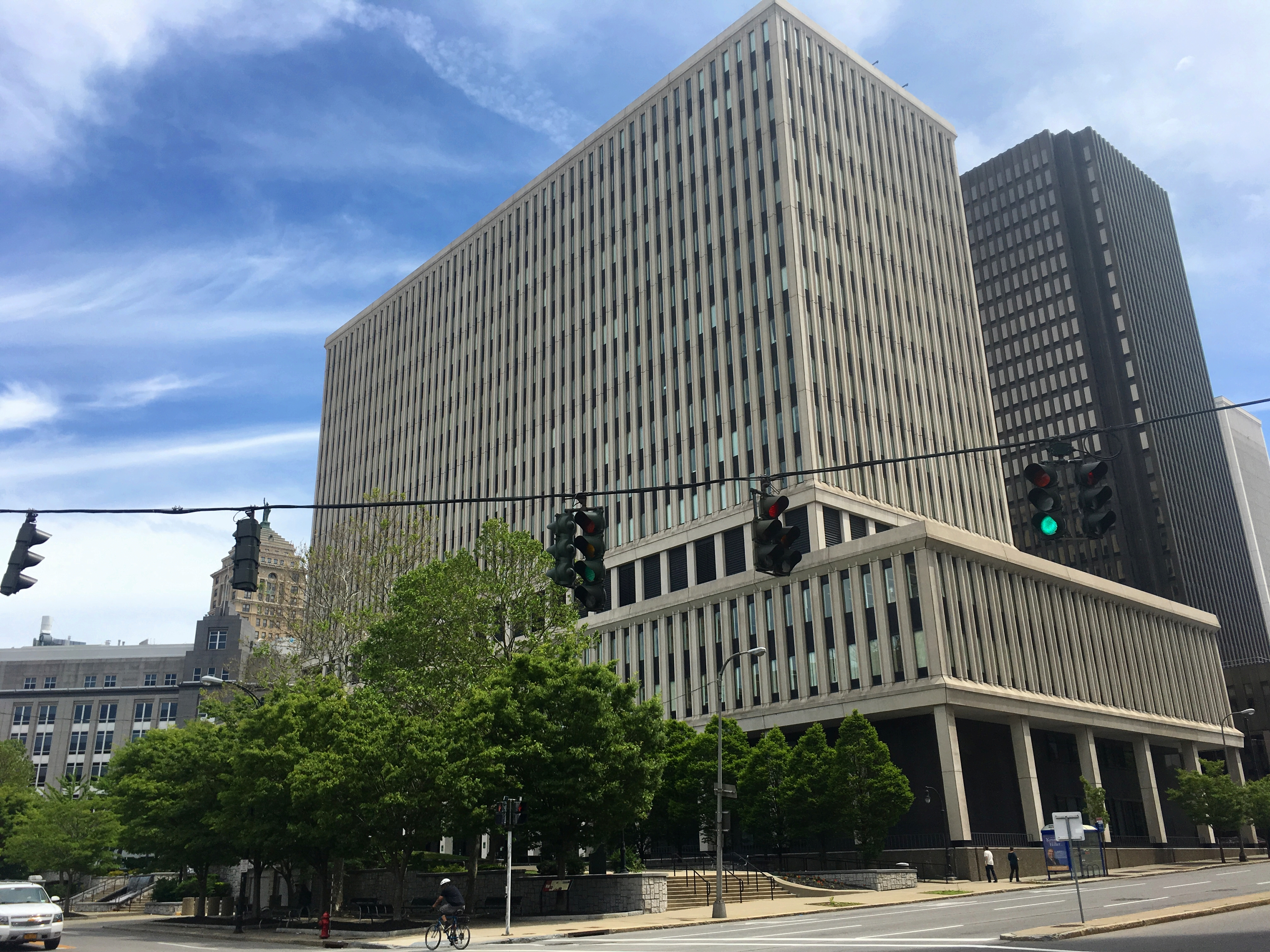
The Edward A. Rath County Office Building in Buffalo, New York, designed by Milstein, Wittek, Davis & Hamilton and Backus, Crane & Love and completed in 1969.

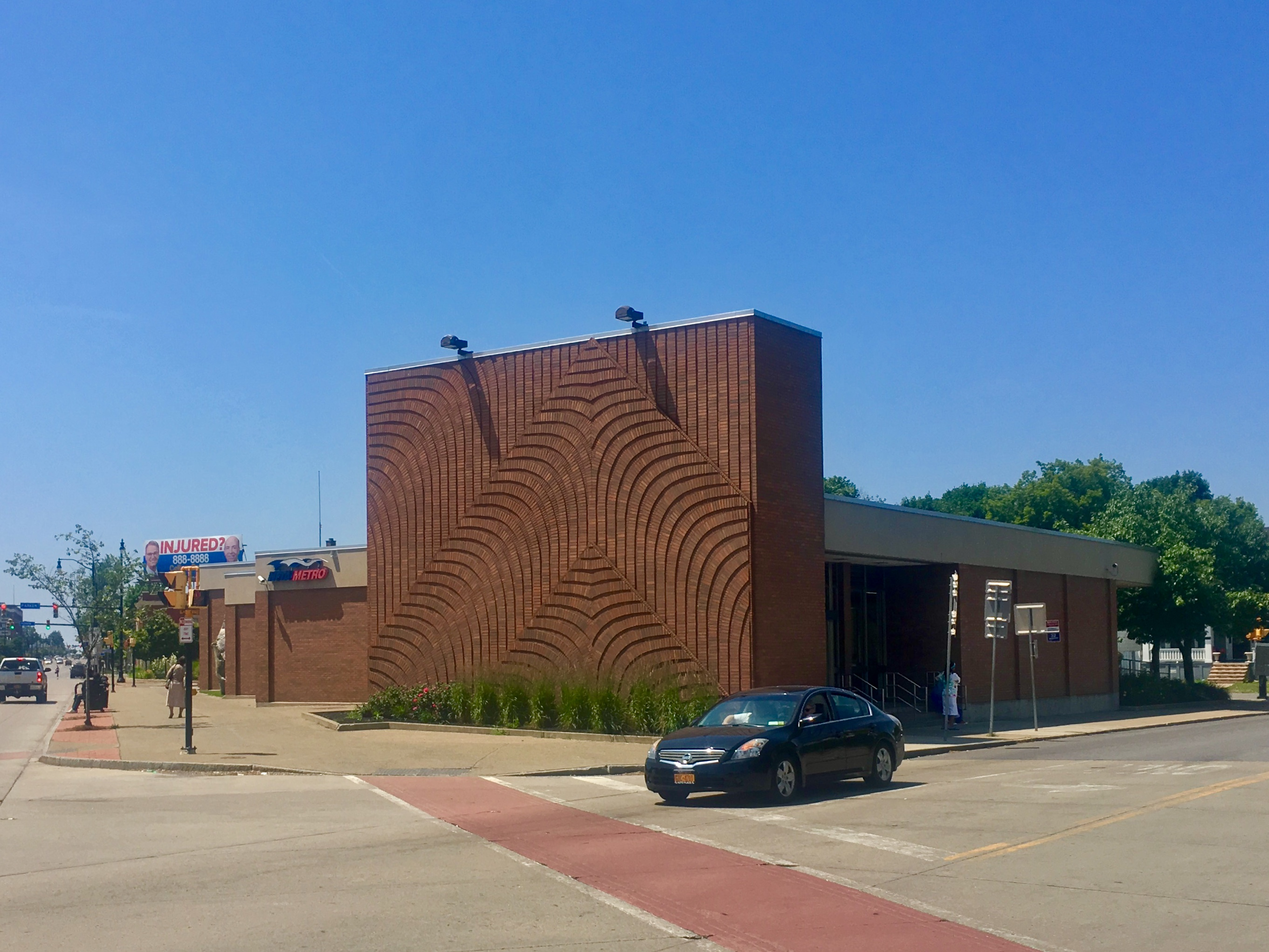
The Amherst Street station of Buffalo Metro Rail, designed by Milstein, Wittek & Associates PC and completed in 1985. Showing the brick mural by Aleksandra Kasuba.

Milton Milstein FAIA (May 17, 1910 – May 9, 1993) was an American architect in practice in Buffalo, New York from 1947 until his retirement in 1991. Milstein was a leader in the architectural and Jewish communities of western New York and was credited by his contemporaries with raising the standard of architectural design in the Buffalo area.

== Life and career ==
Milton Milstein was born May 17, 1910, in New York City to Samuel Milstein and Rebecca Milstein, née Zimmerman. He was educated at Syracuse University, graduating in 1933 with a BArch, followed by a year of post-graduate study. He was offered a teaching position in the university but declined in order to pursue a career in practice. He first worked for Syracuse architects D. Kenneth Sargent and Paul Hueber before moving to Buffalo in 1940, where he worked for several architects before joining the office of James William Kideney after World War II. He was made an associate in Kideney's firm in 1947. In 1949 Milstein completed the Jewish Community Center of Buffalo, designed under Kideney's supervision, and in 1950 opened an independent office.

In 1959 Milstein formed the partnership of Milton Milstein & Associates with several employees. In 1966, to reflect the growing importance of partners Warren Wittek AIA, Arthur Henry Davis AIA and Michael Hamilton AIA, the firm was renamed Milstein, Wittek, Davis & Hamilton. It was renamed again in 1969 to Milstein, Wittek, Davis & Associates after the departure of Hamilton.

In 1980 the firm was incorporated as Milstein, Wittek, Davis & Associates PC. With the departures of Davis and Wittek the firm was renamed Milstein, Wittek & Associates PC in 1984 and Milstein Kwapisz & Associates PC in 1989. Milstein was head of this firm until his retirement in 1991. Under his leadership the firm won many design awards and he was credited with raising the standard of design in the Buffalo area. Milstein's firm was dissolved in 1994 after his death and the death of his former partner, Henry J. Kwapisz.

Milstein joined the American Institute of Architects in 1945 as a member of the Buffalo/Western New York chapter. He served as chapter president from 1962 to 1964 as well as on the AIA aesthetics committee. He served on the New York State Board for Architecture, the body responsible for setting licensure standards, from 1966 to 1976, and was chair for 1975–76. He was elected a Fellow of the AIA in 1968.

== Personal life ==
Milstein was Jewish and was active in his community. He completed buildings for several local Jewish institutions, including the Jewish Community Center of Buffalo (1949) and Rosa Coplon Jewish Home and Infirmary (1954) and a new synagogue, Temple Sinai (1957), in suburban Amherst. He was a member of Temple Beth Zion and was considered for its new building, but lost the commission to Max Abramovitz. He also served on the board of directors of Catholic Daemen College, now Daemen University, and designed many of the campus buildings.

Milstein was married to Nan Levy in 1936. They had two children. In retirement Milstein lived in Hamden, Connecticut. He died May 9, 1993, in New Haven, Connecticut at the age of 82.

== Architectural works ==
- 1949 – Jewish Community Center of Buffalo, (Note: Designed by Milstein with James William Kideney as associate architect.) 787 Delaware Ave, Buffalo, New York
- 1954 – Rosa Coplon Jewish Home and Infirmary, 10 Symphony Cir, Buffalo, New York
- 1957 – Temple Sinai, 50 Alberta Dr, Amherst, New York
- 1958 – Glenny Drive Apartments, Buffalo, New York
- 1960 – Olean Municipal Building, 101 E State St, Olean, New York
- 1963 – Olean General Hospital, 515 Main St, Olean, New York
- 1964 – Erie County Court Building, 25 Delaware Ave, Buffalo, New York
- 1964 – St. Anthony Catholic Church, 306 Ingham Ave, Lackawanna, New York
- 1967 – Cattaraugus County Courthouse, 303 Court St, Little Valley, New York
- 1967 – Charles J. Wick Campus Center, Daemen University, Amherst, New York
- 1969 – Edward A. Rath County Office Building, (Note: Designed by Milstein, Wittek, Davis & Hamilton and Backus, Crane & Love, associated architects.) 95 Franklin St, Buffalo, New York
- 1975 – Ellicott Complex, (Note: Designed by Davis, Brody & Associates with Milstein, Wittek, Davis & Associates as associate architects.) University at Buffalo, Amherst, New York
- 1979 – Timon Towers, 1015 Delaware Ave, Buffalo, New York
- 1980 – Erie County Hall restoration, 92 Franklin St, Buffalo, New York
- 1985 – Buffalo Metro Rail Amherst Street station, (Note: Featuring an integral brick mural by environmental artist Aleksandra Kasuba, as well as work by other artists.) 2646 Main St, Buffalo, New York
