= Lewis Wharf =

Coordinates: 42.3633°N 71.0501°W

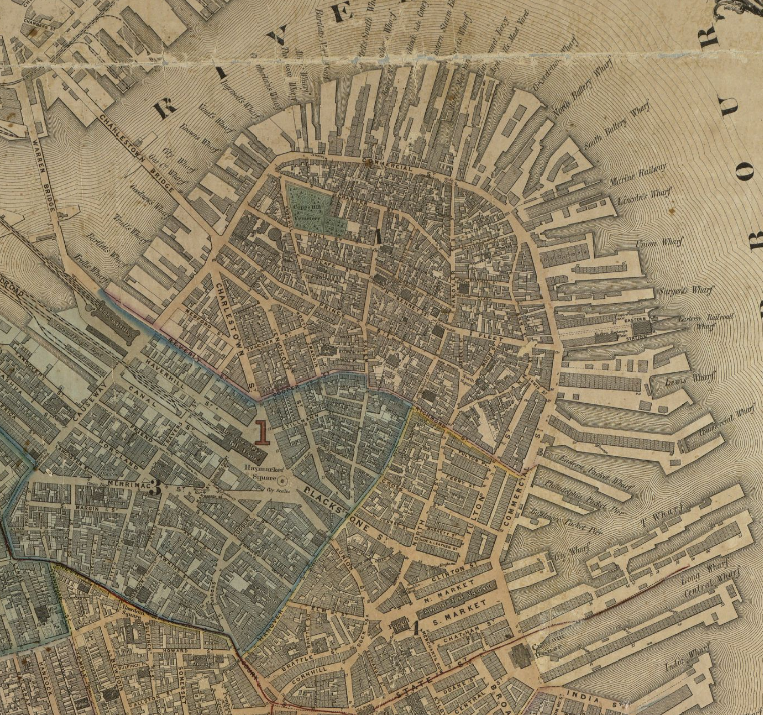
Lewis Wharf appears in the center right of this 1852 map of Boston's North End.

Lewis Wharf is a showpiece of waterfront urban renewal in Boston's historic North End. The granite structures on the wharf were built as an early 19th-century shopping mall in the era before railroads when water transport was the most efficient way to move commodities to marketplaces.

== History ==
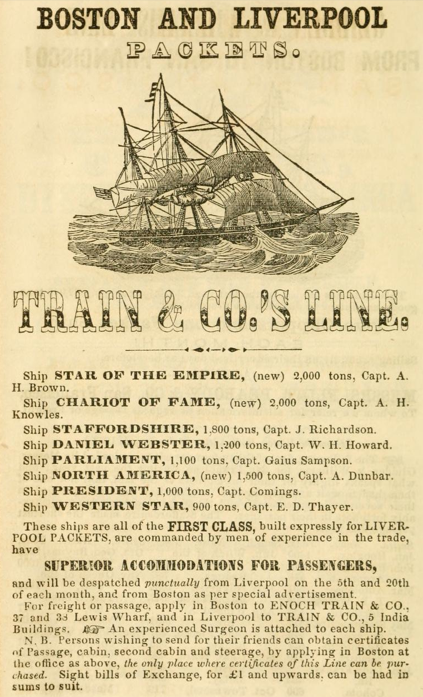
An 1853 advertisement of trans-Atlantic passenger service from Lewis Wharf.

Boston was the trade center of the colonial Province of Massachusetts Bay. Waterfront property was developed as a shopping center of stores selling goods unloaded from adjoining wharfs. Property was owned by wealthy wharfingers who collected fees from ships loading or unloading cargoes and leased the stores and warehouse space to local merchants who purchased, stored and sold those cargoes. Lewis Wharf was within an area known as Clark's Wharf while owned by provincial councilor William Clark. It was later owned by Thomas Hancock and inherited by his nephew John Hancock in 1764. Thomas Lewis of Lynn, Massachusetts, was a successful merchant during the years following the American Revolution. He reorganized a portion of the property from John Hancock's estate in 1793 as Thomas Lewis and Son with three leased stores. Thomas Lewis had three sons: Thomas, David and John. Thomas assumed control of the wharf when his father died in 1809. John became heir to the property when his brother died in 1824. John and his cousin Samuel G. Lewis established the Lewis Wharf Company in 1834, and upgraded the property with stores which were among the earliest granite masonry buildings in Boston.

Lewis Wharf stores represented the apex of New England marketplace architecture in the age of water transport. Merchandise arrived at the wharf in watercraft of all sizes from Middlesex Canal boats to oceangoing schooners. Items advertised for sale included cocoa, cod, "Guadeloupe cotton", "Jamaican fish", gin, rice, salt, white sugar, "brown Havana sugar", tar, and turpentine. As railroads extended inland from port cities like Boston, wharves became locations for transfer of freight and new marketplaces were built near population centers. The most efficient freight transfer wharves were those designed for bulk cargoes; so demand for wharf warehouse space declined through the 20th century and practically disappeared as intermodal containerized freight transport became standardized. In 1973, the old granite and timber warehouses were renovated by Carl Koch. The two lowest floors were designated for commercial occupancy while the upper four stories became residential condominiums.
