= Robert T. Coles =

American architect, educator, and social justice activist (1929–2020)

- Born: August 24, 1929; Buffalo, New York
- Died: May 16, 2020 (aged 90); Buffalo, New York
- Occupation: Architect
- Awards: Rotch Travelling Scholarship, Boston Society of Architects (1955); Whitney M. Young Jr. Award, American Institute of Architects (1981); Edward C. Kemper Award, American Institute of Architects (2019)
- Practice: Robert Traynham Coles Architect

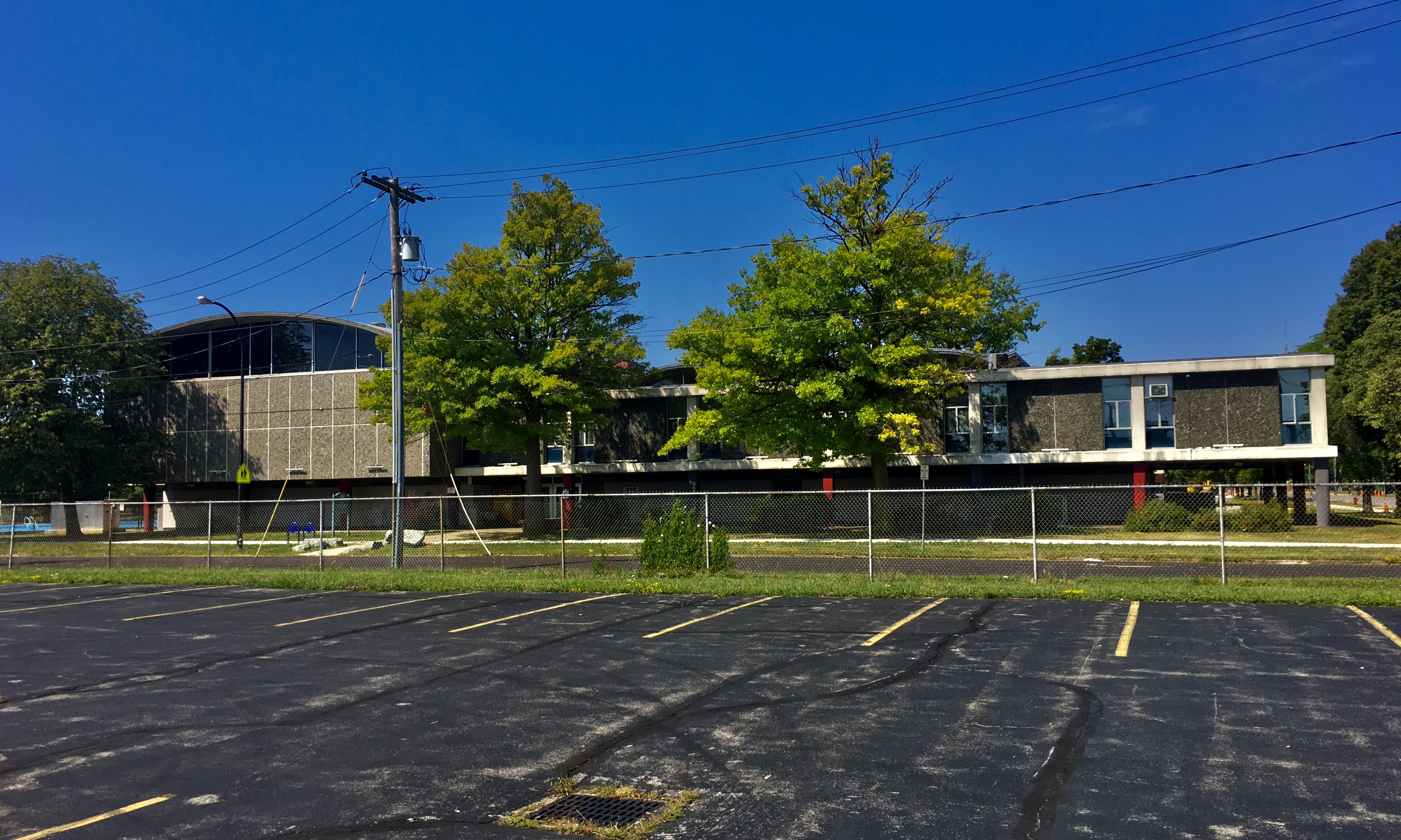
The John F. Kennedy Recreation Center in Buffalo, designed by Coles and completed in 1963.

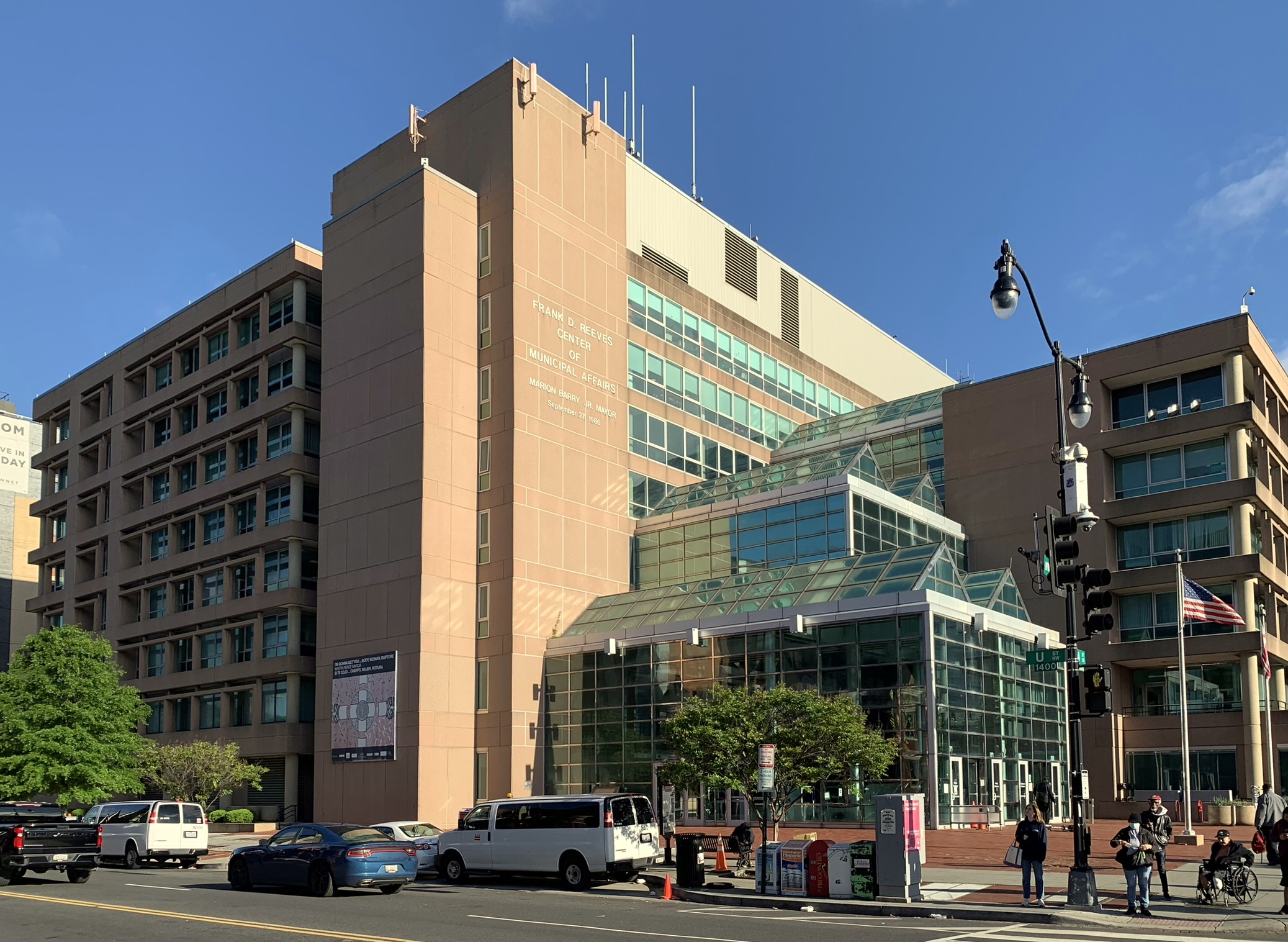
The Frank D. Reeves Center of Municipal Affairs in Washington, D.C., designed by Coles and completed in 1986.

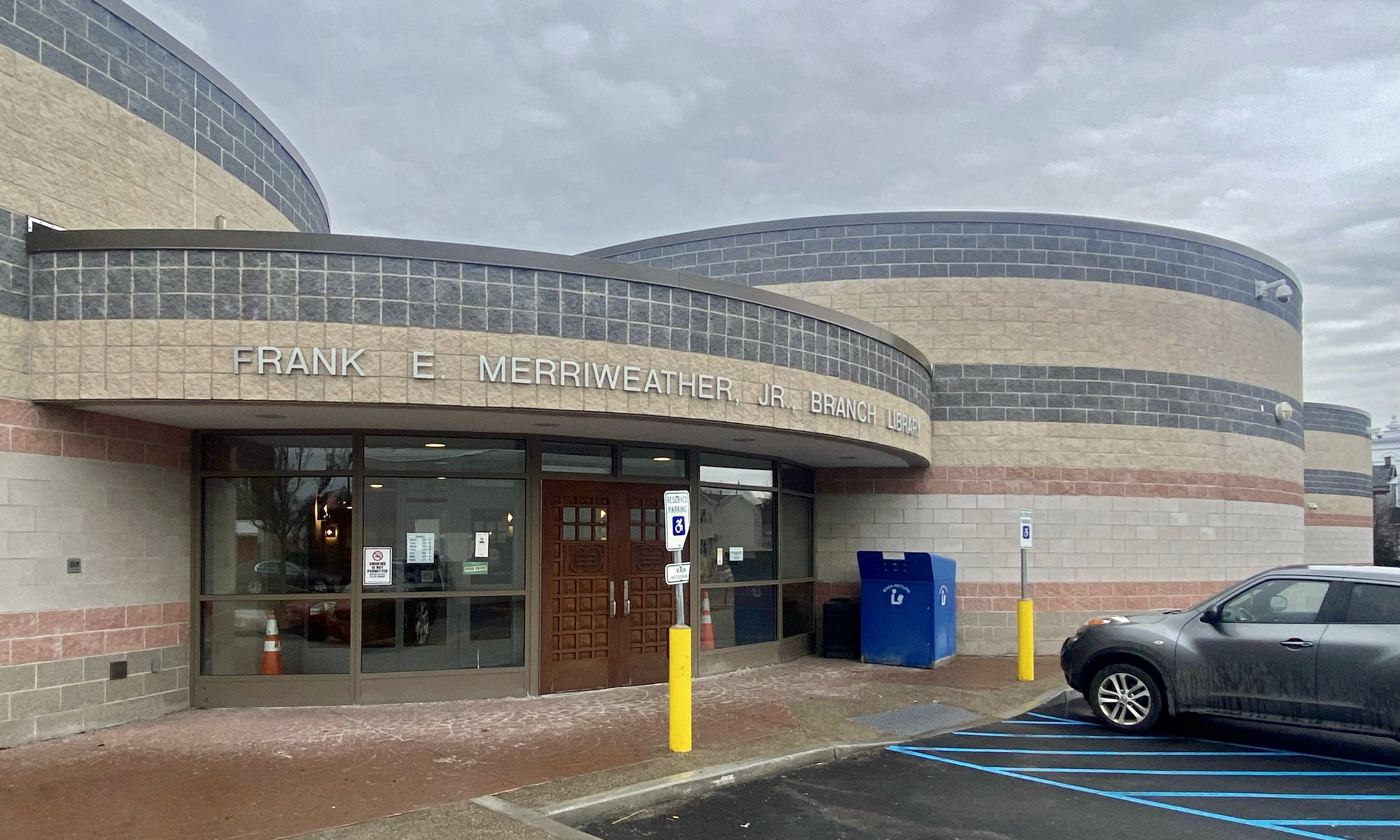
The Frank E. Merriweather Jr. Branch of the Buffalo & Erie County Public Library, designed by Coles and completed in 2006.

Robert Traynham Coles FAIA (24 August 1929 – 16 May 2020) was an architect, educator, and social justice activist. Coles was the first African American to win the Rotch Traveling Scholarship awarded by the Boston Society of Architects, the first African American Chancellor of the American Institute of Architects (AIA), the first AIA Vice-President for Minority Affairs, and a founding member of the National Organization of Minority Architects (NOMA).

In 1963, Coles opened his firm Robert Traynham Coles, Architect in Buffalo, New York, making it the first African American owned firm in New York State and in the Northeast.

== Education ==
Coles attended Hampton University in 1947 before transferring to the University of Minnesota in 1949, where he earned a Bachelor of Arts in 1951 and a Bachelor of Architecture in 1953. Coles received his Masters of Architecture from Massachusetts Institute of Technology in 1955. While at MIT, Coles wrote his thesis on urban renewal in his hometown of Buffalo, New York, where he later opened his practice.

== Career ==
Robert T. Coles faced many obstacles in starting his career. Despite being discouraged from considering the profession by his high school teachers and despite being the only African American in his class at the University of Minnesota, Coles was not deterred and went on to have a successful architectural career. After graduating from MIT and returning from his traveling fellowship in Europe, Coles worked for firms such as Shepley, Bulfinch, Richardson, Carl Koch and Associates and Techbuilt, before opening his own practice in 1963. His first project was the commission of his thesis project, the Ellicott District Recreation Center, known today as the John F. Kennedy Recreation Centre by the city of Buffalo. Coles considered his firm's first project also his first advocacy project, emerging from conversations with a community facing the threat of urban renewal. Community engagement became a crux of Coles's career, and he continued to pursue diversity, inclusion, and equity in his work. Coles was also an outspoken critic of the field of architecture, advocating for better equity, access, and opportunities for women and minority practitioners.

Coles was the Langston Hughes Professor of Architecture and Urban Design at the University of Kansas in 1989, where he delivered the lecture "Black Architects, An Endangered Species" which was later published in Progressive Architecture Magazine. In 1990-1995, Coles was an Associate Professor of Architecture at Carnegie Mellon University.

== Projects ==
- Robert T. Coles House and Studio, Buffalo NY (1961)
- John F. Kennedy Recreation Center, Buffalo NY (1963)
- Lindbergh Center Station, Atlanta GA (1983)
- Frank Reeves Municipal Center, Washington DC (1986)
- Frank Merriweather Library, Buffalo NY (1995)
- Ambulatory Care Project for Harlem Hospital, Harlem NY (1998)

== Awards and honors ==
- 1955 Rotch Traveling Fellowship, Boston Society of Architects
- 1963 Award of Merit (for Robert T. Coles House), AIA
- 1977 Doctor of Letters (Honorary), Medaille College, Buffalo, NY
- 1981 Whitney M. Young, Jr. Citation, AIA for his social justice advocacy in the profession
- 2004 James William Kideney Gold Medal Award, AIA New York State
- 2009 Robert and Louise Bethune Award, Buffalo/WNY AIA
- 2011 Fellows Award, Honors Awards Jury AIA New York State
- 2016 Diversity Award, Buffalo/WNY AIA
- 2019 Edward C. Kemper Award, AIA

== Publications ==
Architecture + Advocacy, Buffalo Arts Publishing (2016)
