= Deck House =

American prefabricated house style

A Deck House is a style of semi-custom, prefabricated home developed by the Deck House Company, an American home manufacturer and design firm founded in 1959 in Acton, Massachusetts. Deck Houses are built with exposed post and beam framing, tongue-and-groove wood ceilings, and large mahogany-framed windows. They are often built on wooded, sloping lots.

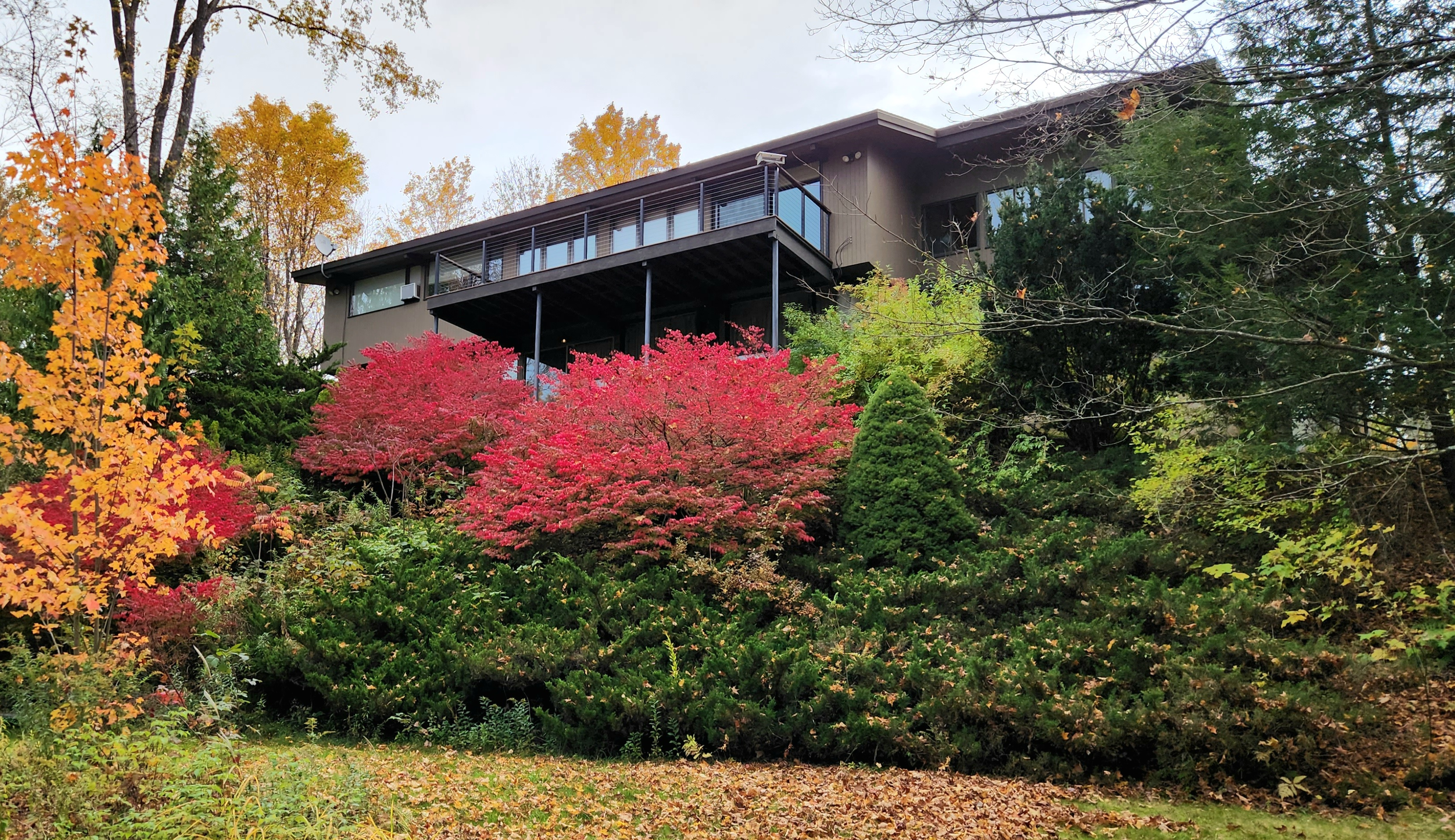
Rear view of a 1967 Vermont Deck House built on a wooded, sloping lot.

Many are located in eastern Massachusetts and the North Carolina Piedmont, but the company and its successor have shipped kits throughout the United States and abroad.

The company was founded by William Berkes and Robert Brownell, both former employees of the defunct Techbuilt, an earlier prefabricated-housing firm established by Carl Koch. In the mid-1990s, it merged with Acorn Structures, and the successor company still exists today as Acorn Deck House. Deck House used Techbuilt's panelized construction approach but highlighted natural materials such as mahogany, cedar, and slate in lieu of industrial finishes. The Deck House has been described as an East Coast counterpart to the Eichler house of California.

== The Following ==
Deck House owners trade ideas and help each other find original Deck House parts. Most keep their homes in original condition, only making changes that are true to the original mid-century modern design, using original materials such as mahogany and red cedar. In February 2016, a Deck House Owners forum began on Facebook. On March 4, 2020, a sister forum called Deck House Parts For Sale was formed to share information about Deck House parts and help recycle genuine Deck House parts.

Acorn Deck House Company support all their early homes by offering retrofit and upgrade solutions, such as drop-in energy efficient, mahogany framed windows to replace the early steel framed units. Likewise, they can supply retrofit 8 foot wide mahogany framed sliding doors to replace the early aluminum framed variety. The company maintains original blueprints and records for most homes built, and is a wealth of information to Deck House owners.

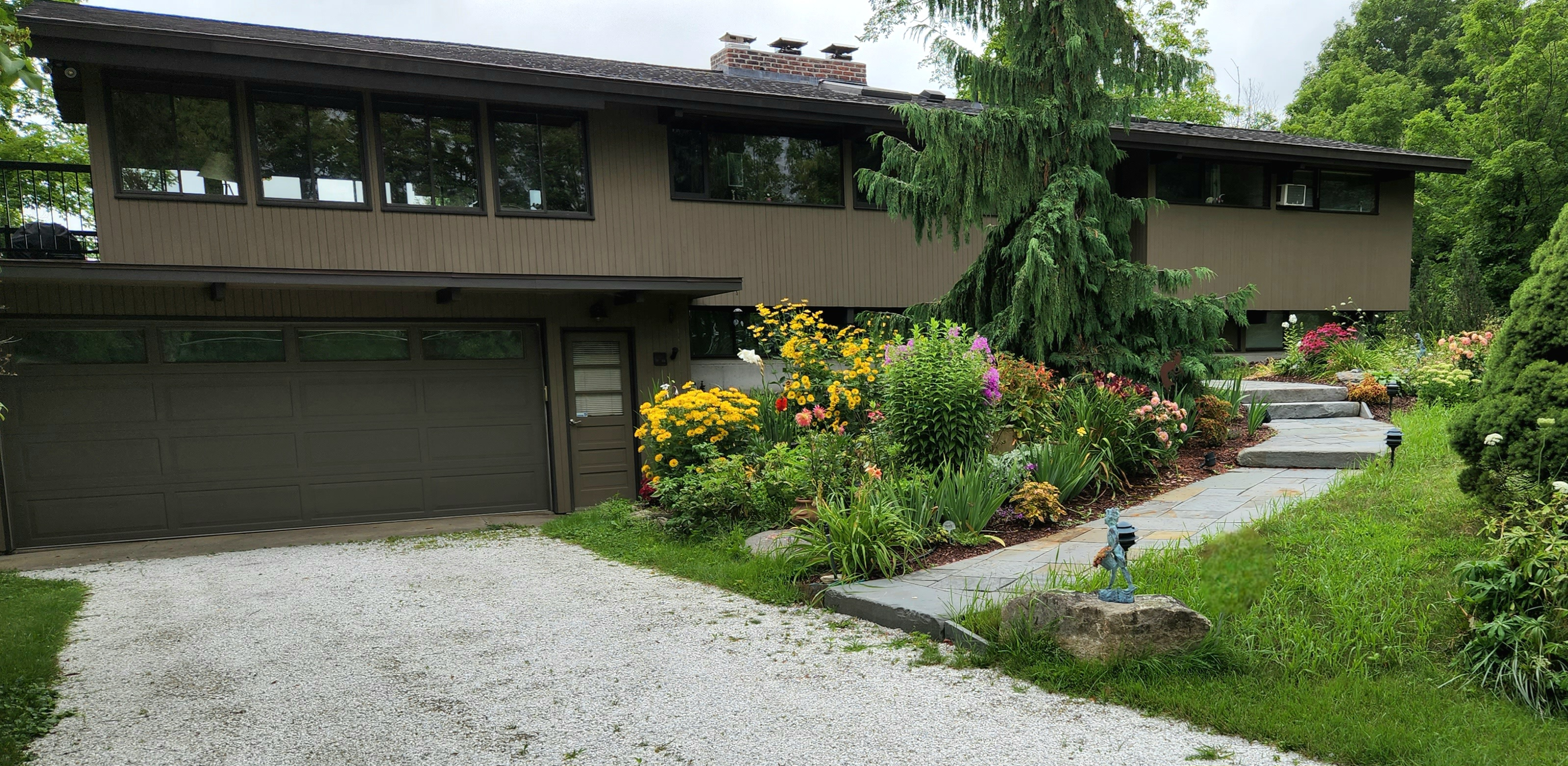
Example of a 1967 Vermont Deck House.

== History ==
=== Background: Techbuilt and post-war prefabrication ===
Carl Koch, an architect who trained at the Harvard Graduate School of Design as Walter Gropius arrived to lead it, pioneered several systems of prefabricated housing. With the engineer John Bemis, he built an early prototype, the Acorn House, in Concord, Massachusetts in the mid-1940s. Although it never reached mass production, the Acorn name carried forward to Acorn Structures; the firm that would later merge with Deck House.

Koch found greater success with the 1953 Techbuilt house, a panelized system aimed at middle-class buyers during the post-war housing shortage. The company distributed standardized components through a national network of franchised builder-dealers for on-site assembly. The architect David Fixler has traced the Deck House system to this work, writing that Koch's building-technology systems became Techbuilt and, through a later merger of early prefabrication efforts, the Deck House system.

=== Founding ===
Berkes and Brownell, both former Techbuilt employees, founded the Deck House Company in 1959. Because New England building sites are often hilly, Berkes adapted the prefabricated single-family house into a split-level configuration suited to sloping terrain. The firm's early work drew on modernist antecedents in Lincoln, Massachusetts, particularly the 1938 Gropius House, but used more natural materials.

=== Mergers and successor companies ===
In the early-to-mid-1990s, Deck House combined with Acorn Structures, under the Deck House, Inc. name while retaining separate product lines; a contemporaneous account dated the deal to 1993, while the present-day company places it in 1995. A holding company acquired the combined firm in 2003, and in 2005 it was renamed Empyrean. That year, Empyrean announced a partnership with Dwell for a new product line called NextHouse, which was closer to orthodox modernism than the classic Deck House. The firm entered receivership in 2008 and was purchased in 2009 by Thomas and Ann Trudeau, who reorganized it as the Acorn Deck House Company. The successor company manufactures kits at an 85,000-square-foot (7,900 m^{2}) factory in Acton and has shipped to Israel, China, Japan, and Australia.

== Design characteristics ==
=== Structure ===
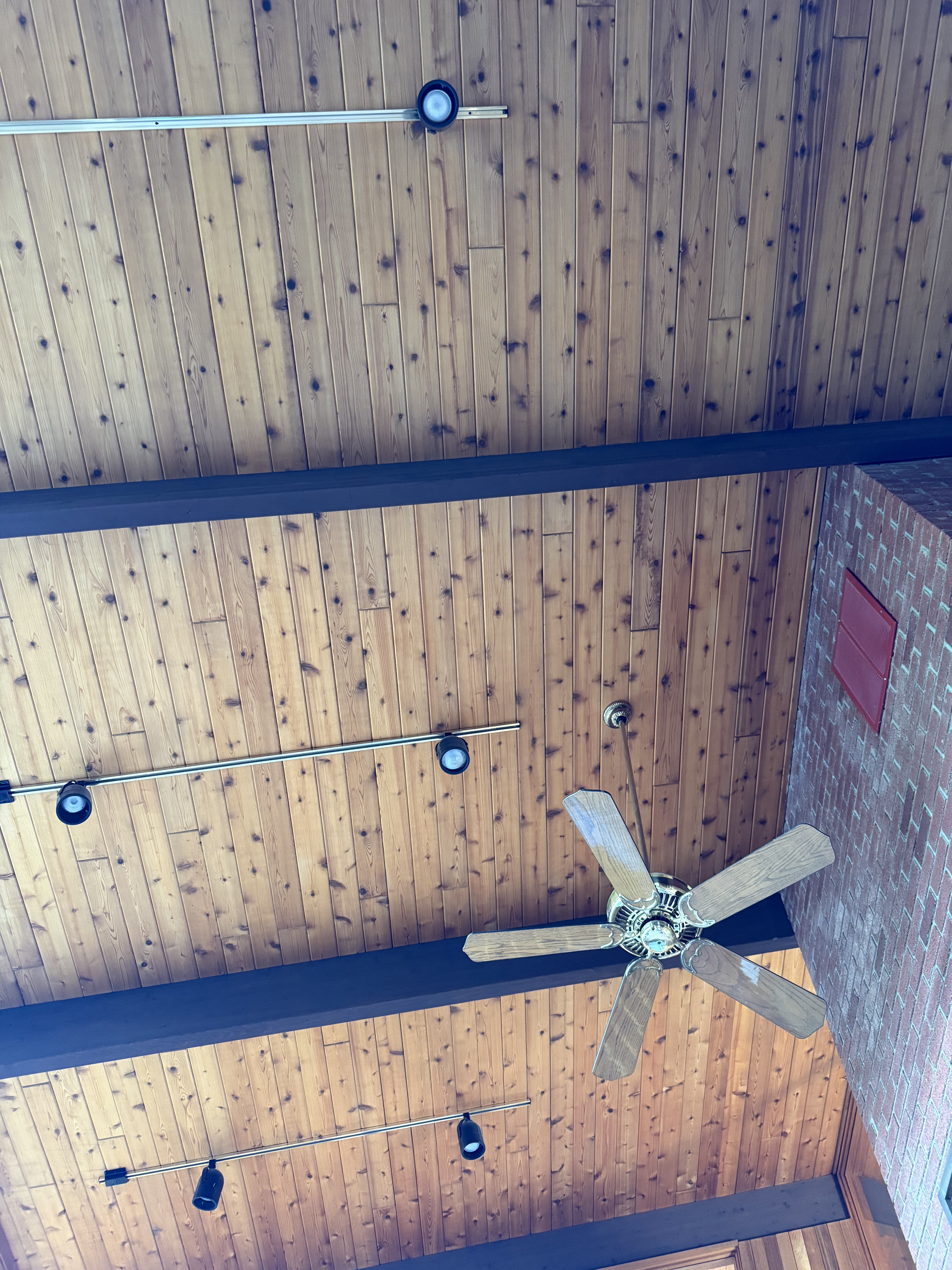
The exposed post-and-beam frame and tongue-and-groove cedar ceiling, both characteristic of the Deck House

Deck Houses use a post-and-beam structural system. 4" x 12" Douglas fir rafters rest on exposed wooden posts spaced to form 8-foot (2.4 m) bays, which removes the need for most interior load-bearing walls and produces open floorplans and vaulted ceilings. The massive rafters extend beyond the building envelope to the outer edges of the roofline and upper floor overhang, and have distinctively shaped tails.

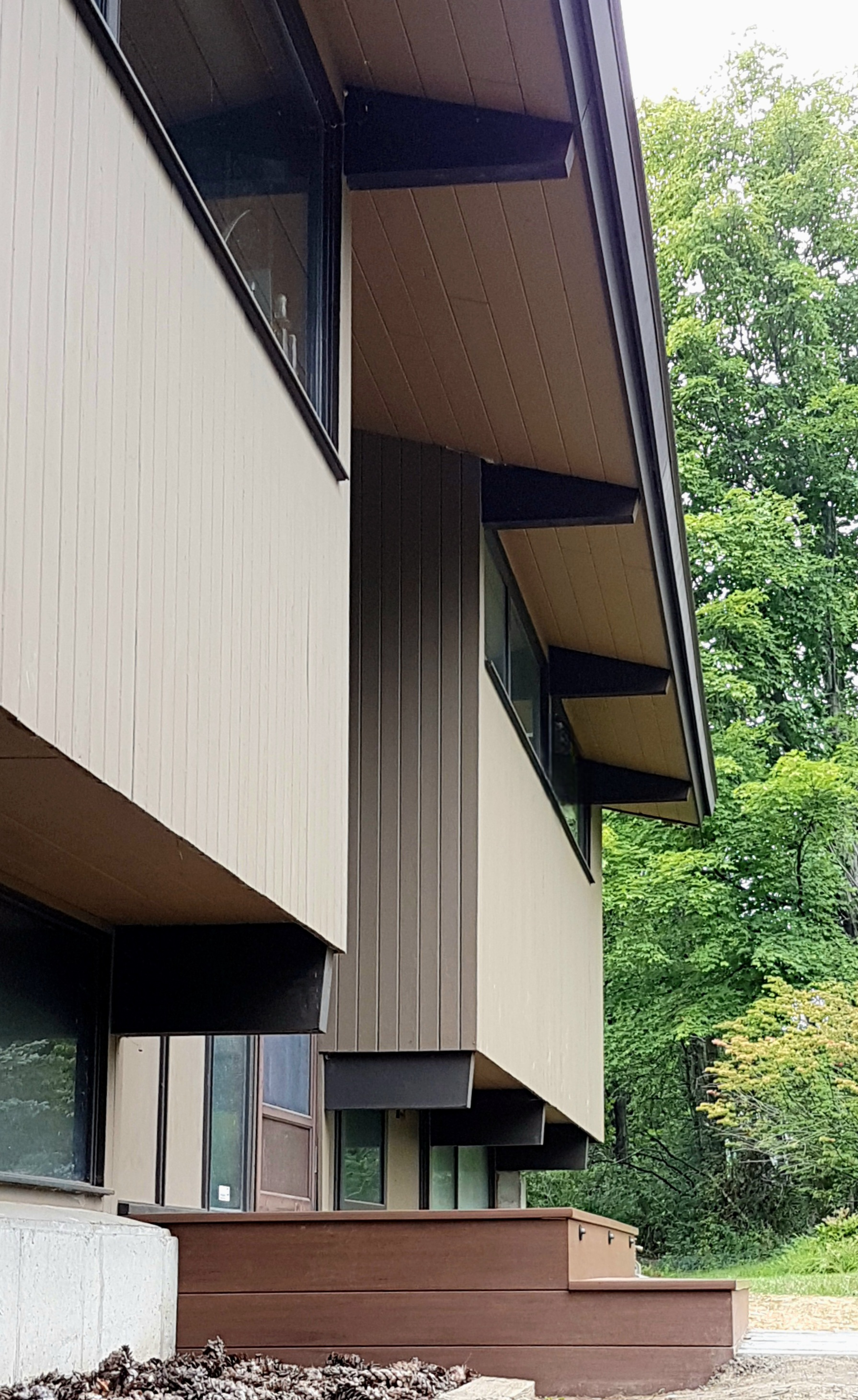
Deck House rafter detail

Between the rafters, 2-inch (5.1 cm) tongue-and-groove wood decking is both the finished ceiling and a structural diaphragm - it transfers horizontal loads and stabilizes the post-and-beam frame.

=== Materials ===
The standard Deck House palette makes use of exposed natural materials. A 1999 listing of the company's standard-package specifications included milled cedar floor and roof decking, cedar or mahogany trim, red cedar clapboards, solid-core cedar and mahogany doors, mahogany stairs and trim, an R-30 insulated roof system, and argon-filled low-E glazing for windows and skylights. Earlier prefabricated systems had used more aluminum, linoleum, and similar industrial materials. Deck Houses were built with thicker wall and roof insulation than their California counterparts because of the colder Northeast climate; early Eichler homes had been frequently criticized for inadequate insulation.

=== Form and siting ===
A typical Deck House has two stories, with gable ends oriented perpendicular to the street. The front elevation commonly has a slightly off-center entry and elevated windows that admit light but maintain privacy. The gable ends often feature floor-to-ceiling glazing so that the post-and-beam frame is visible from outside. Cantilevered second-story eponymous decks are common, as are wide overhangs on low-pitched gable roofs.

== Production and distribution ==
The largest concentrations of Deck Houses are in eastern Massachusetts and in the Piedmont region of North Carolina. The Stonehedge subdivision in Lincoln, Massachusetts contains about eighty Deck Houses built starting in 1962. Co-founder Robert Brownell lived in a Deck House in Stonehedge for 25 years.

Most houses were customized. A regional sales manager and architect for the company said in 1999 that, in 26 years of building Deck Houses, he had completed only three to a standard plan.

== Comparisons and reception ==
The Deck House has often been compared to the Eichler house of California; both used post-and-beam framing, gable-end glazing, and a prefabricated delivery model. Joseph Eichler's firm began producing houses about a decade before Deck House, but the direction of influence between the two is unclear. The architectural historian Kazys Varnelis has written that Deck Houses match the quality of Eichler's work but have received much less critical attention.

Reviewers have also identified Wrightian elements in the design. The Washington Post wrote in 1997 that "the influence of Frank Lloyd Wright looms large" in the family room of a model home, which had a 12-foot-high (3.7 m) window wall, and described the firm's style as having "Wright-style flourishes" that distinguished it from the craftsman-style Acorn line. The architect Colin Flavin similarly wrote that the wide, low-pitched roof overhangs borrow "a page from the Frank Lloyd Wright playbook." Other writers describe the Deck House as an "architectural offshoot" of mid-century modern residential architecture and trace its design lineage to the Bauhaus tradition through Koch. Writing in ArchitectureBoston in 2009, the architect David Fixler argued that the modest scale of Deck Houses and related postwar Modern homes (many under 2,000 square feet (190 m^{2})) had given them renewed relevance against a later trend toward larger suburban houses.

== See also ==
- Usonian
- Lustron house
