= James William Kideney =

American architect (1899–1987)

- Born: April 25, 1899; Pittsburgh, Pennsylvania, U.S.
- Died: November 10, 1987 (aged 88)
- Occupation: Architect
- Awards: Fellow, American Institute of Architects (1949)
- Practice: James William Kideney; Harbach & Kideney; James William Kideney & Associates; Kideney, Smith & Fitzgerald; Kideney, Smith, Fitzgerald & Partners

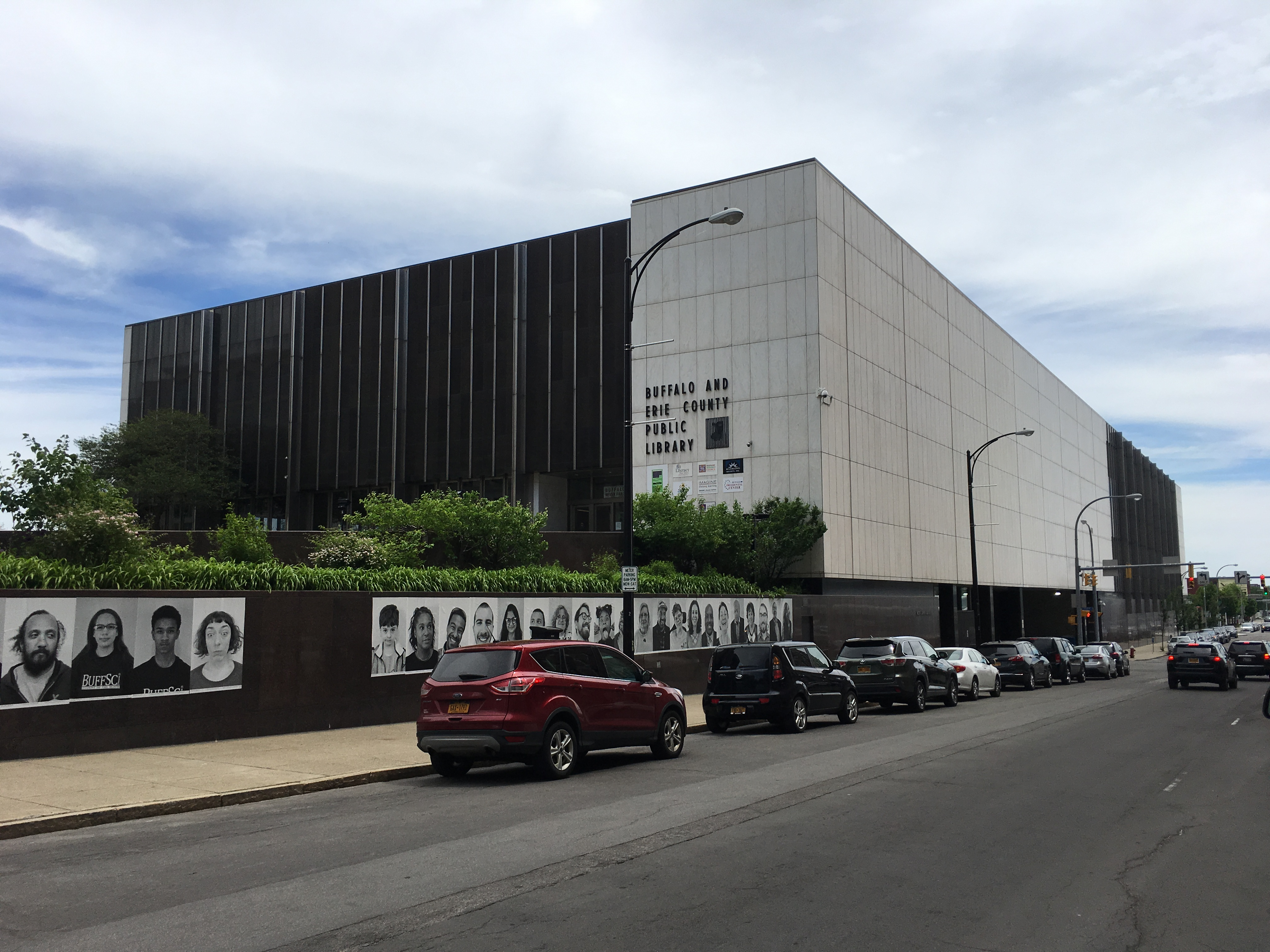
The Central Library of the Buffalo & Erie County Public Library, designed by James William Kideney & Associates with Paul Hyde Harbach and Elon B. Clark Jr. and completed in 1964.

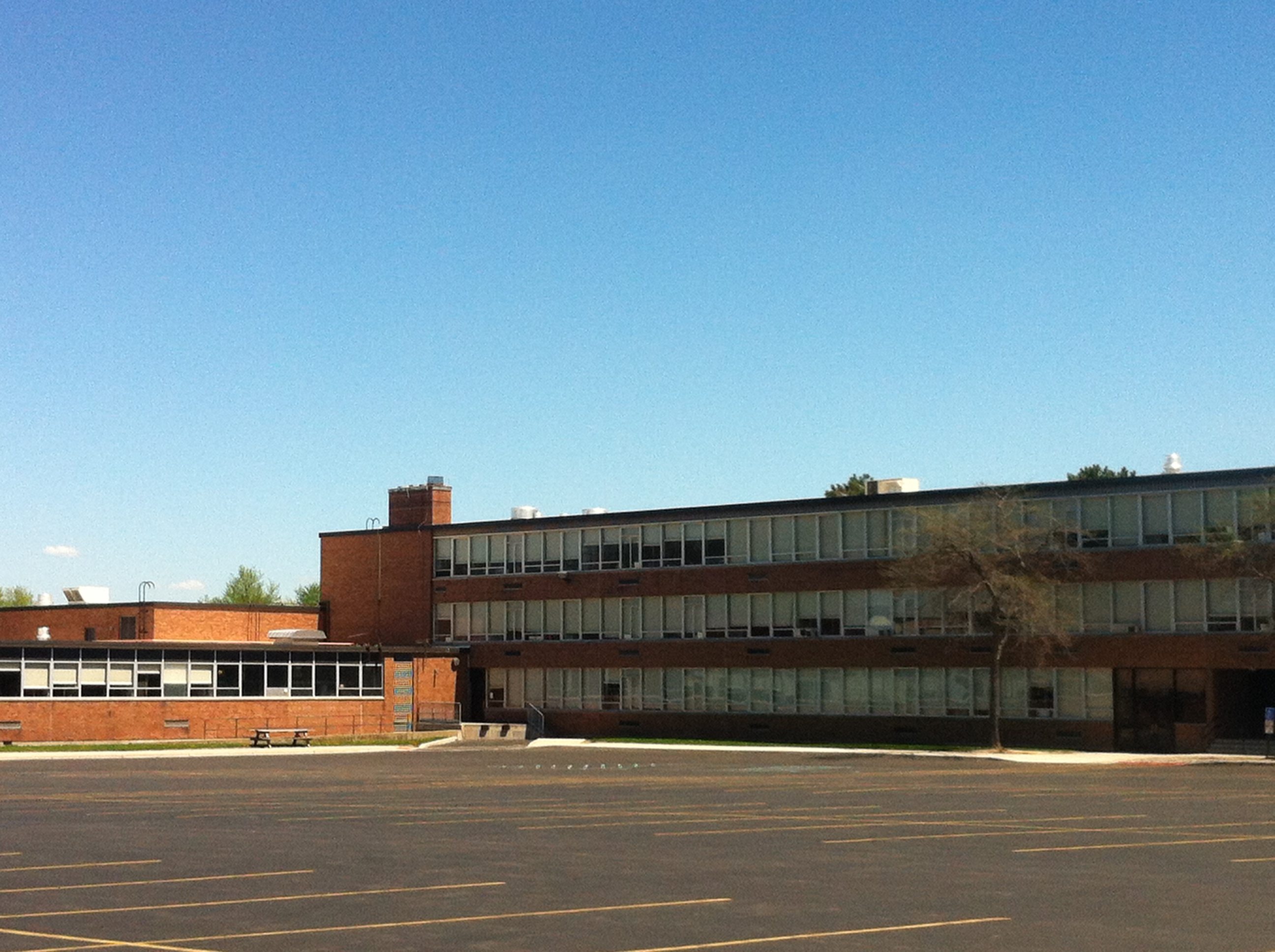
The Orchard Park High School, originally the Orchard Park Junior High School, designed by James William Kideney & Associates and completed in 1960.

James William Kideney FAIA (April 25, 1899 – November 10, 1987) was an American architect in practice in Buffalo, New York, from 1926 until his retirement in 1974.

The firm he founded is still in business as Kideney Architects PC. He is the namesake of the James William Kideney Gold Medal Award, the highest honor awarded by AIA New York State.

== Early life and education ==
Kideney was born April 25, 1899, in Pittsburgh to William W. Kideney and Ada J. Kideney, née Porter. He was educated at the University of Michigan, graduating with a Bachelor of Science degree in architecture in 1921.

== Career ==
After a year of European travel, he moved to Buffalo, New York, where he worked as a drafter. In 1926, he opened his own office. In 1929, he formed the partnership of Harbach & Kideney with Paul Hyde Harbach, an architect in practice in Buffalo since 1923. They worked together until they dissolved their partnership in 1942 during World War II.

After eight years of independent practice, in 1950 he formed a new partnership, James William Kideney & Associates, with several staff. In 1958, this became Kideney, Smith & Fitzgerald to reflect the growing roles of partners George D. Smith Jr. AIA and Thomas W. Fitzgerald PE. The firm was renamed Kideney, Smith, Fitzgerald & Partners in 1969 after the admission of several other partners, including John M. Laping FAIA.

Kideney retired in 1974 after 48 years of practice.

Kideney joined the American Institute of Architects (AIA) in 1935 as a member of the Buffalo chapter. He was a founder of the New York State Association of Architects, the AIA's state-level chapter, and served as its first president from 1938 to 1942. In 1949, he was elected a Fellow of the AIA. He also served on the New York board of examiners of architects from 1949 until 1957.

== Personal life ==
Kideney was married to Isabel Houck in 1930. He died on November 10, 1987, at the age of 88.

== Legacy ==
In 1974, the year of Kideney's retirement, his firm became the oldest continuously operating architectural practice in Buffalo following the closure of James, Meadows & Howard, successors to Green & Wicks.

In 1977, John M. Laping, a partner since 1969, became managing partner and the firm was renamed The Kideney Smith Fitzgerald Laping Partnership. In 1989, the firm was incorporated as Kideney Associates/Laping Jaeger Architects PC, soon changed to Kideney Architects/Laping Jaeger Associates PC. Laping retired in 2003 and the firm was renamed Kideney Architects PC, its current (2024) name, in 2006.

AIA New York State, of which Kideney was founding president, established the James William Kideney Gold Medal Award in his name in 1981. It was first awarded to Joseph D. Monticciolo of Long Island. Notable recipients have included Robert T. Coles (2004), Giorgio Cavaglieri (2006), George H. Miller (2011) and David J. Burney (2016) as well as his partner, Laping (1989).

== Architectural works ==
- 1931 – Amherst Central High School, 4301 Main St, Snyder, New York
- 1939 – York Central School, 2578 Genesee St, Greigsville, New York
- 1949 – Jewish Community Center of Buffalo, (Note: Designed by Milton Milstein with Kideney as associate architect.) 787 Delaware Ave, Buffalo, New York
- 1950 – Student union and dormitories, Buffalo State University, Buffalo, New York
- 1954 – Harris Hill Elementary School, 4260 Harris Hill Rd, Williamsville, New York
- 1956 – Public School 38, (Note: Designated a Buffalo landmark in 2019.) 350 Vermont St, Buffalo, New York
- 1957 – Gowanda Central High School, 10674 Prospect St, Gowanda, New York
- 1960 – Orchard Park High School, 4040 Baker Rd, Orchard Park, New York
- 1962 – Faith United Church of Christ, 1300 Maple Rd, Williamsville, New York
- 1962 – Upton Hall, Buffalo State University, Buffalo, New York
- 1964 – Buffalo & Erie County Public Library, (Note: Designed by Kideney with Paul Hyde Harbach and Elon B. Clark Jr., associate architects.) 1 Lafayette Sq, Buffalo, New York
- 1964 – Heim Middle School, 175 Heim Rd, Williamsville, New York
- 1964 – Pembroke Junior/Senior High School, 8750 Alleghany Rd, Corfu, New York
- 1964 – Twin Rise complex, Buffalo State University, Buffalo, New York
- 1969 – SUNY Erie north campus expansion, Williamsville, New York
- 1972 – Classroom Building, Buffalo State University, Buffalo, New York
