= Turning Mill / Middle Ridge =

Modernist subdivision in Lexington, Massachusetts

Coordinates: 42°28′49″N 71°13′57″W

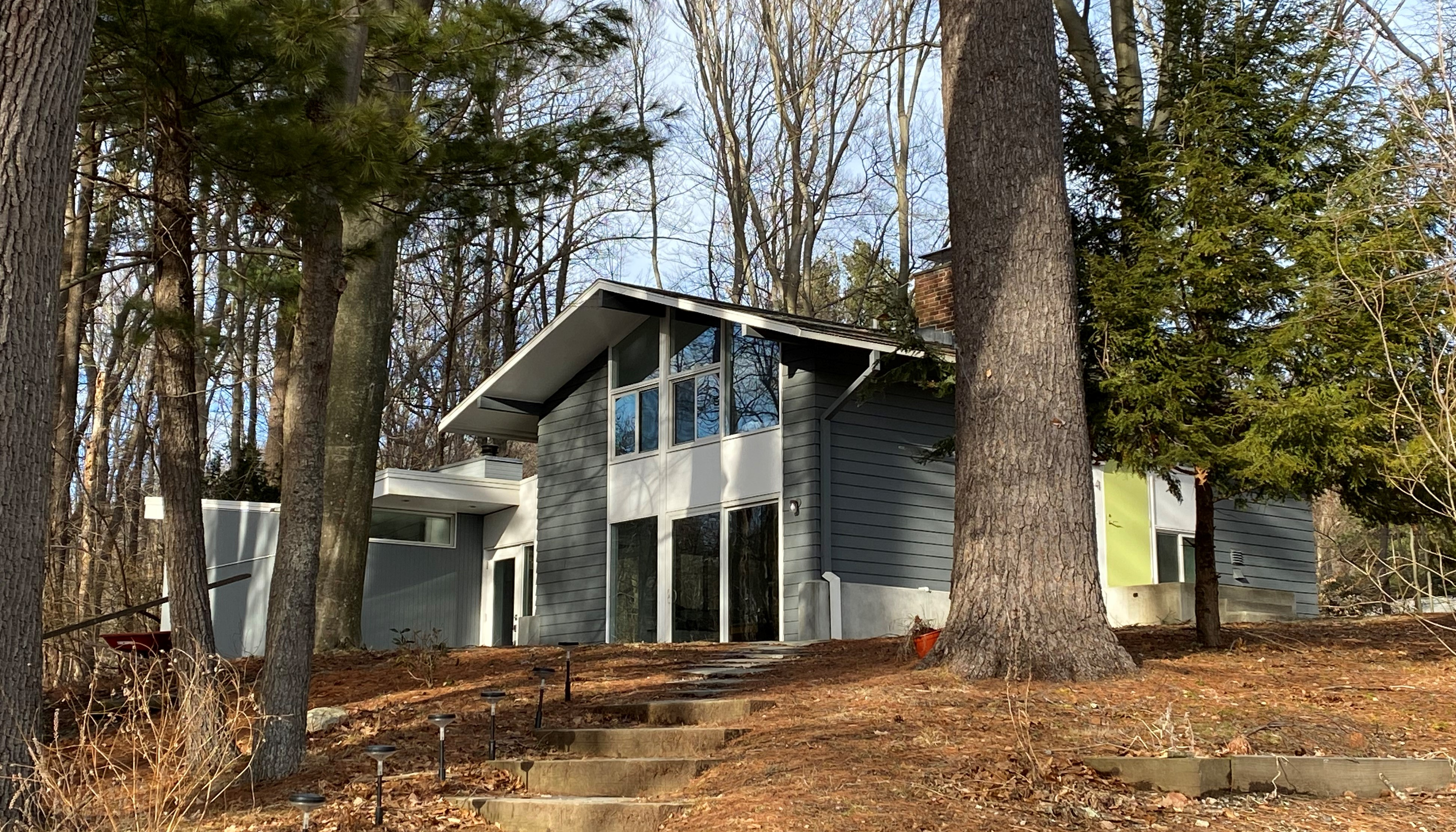
A 1956 Techbuilt house in the Turning Mill district (2022 photo)

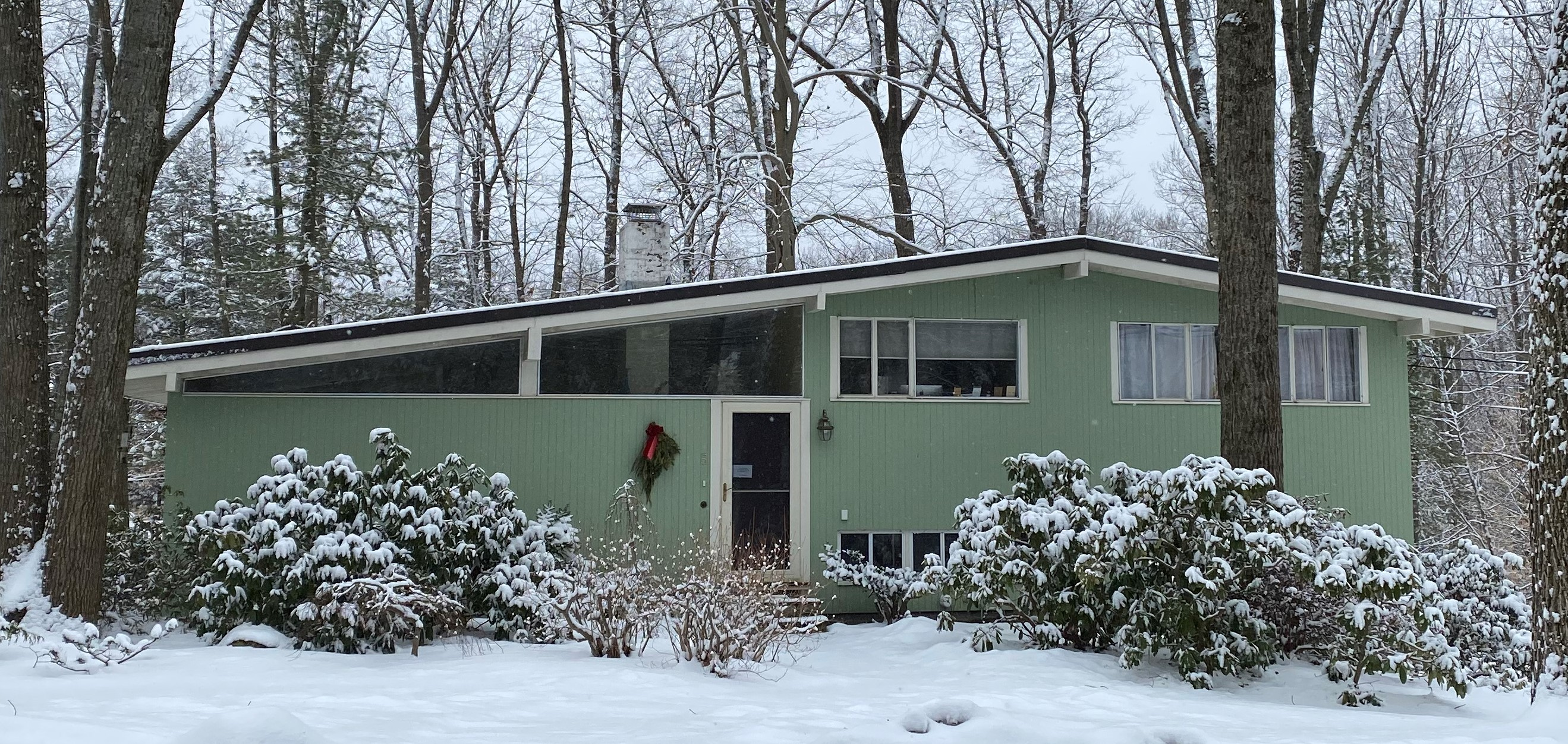
A 1958 "Peacock Farm" style house in the Turning Mill district (2022 photo)

Turning Mill is a residential neighborhood of mid-century modern houses in Lexington, Massachusetts, US.

== Description ==
Turning Mill is a residential neighborhood located in northern Lexington, Massachusetts. It includes a section originally known as "Middle Ridge" and the slightly later "Upper Turning Mill" section; they were named a Neighborhood Conservation District by the Town of Lexington in 2018. Almost all of the houses in the neighborhood were built between the years of 1955 and 1967.

== Background ==
The post-World War II period was a time of significant growth of suburban housing in the United States, most of which employed traditional, American designs. Levittown, New York was the best-known example, where a new house could be bought for $7000 with just $100 down and drew in many homecoming soldiers. Lexington was also experiencing growth of housing, but was close to the academic centers where new design ideas were being developed, such as at the Harvard Graduate School of Design led by Bauhaus founder Walter Gropius, and the MIT School of Architecture and Planning. Lexington was home to many professionals and academics whose minds were open to different design ideas.

When the Turning Mill / Middle Ridge project began in 1955, there were already three communities designed with modernist principles under development in Lexington: Six Moon Hill; developed by The Architects Collaborative (TAC) (1947); Five Fields, also developed by TAC begun in 1951; and Peacock Farm, by Walter Pierce and Danforth Compton (1951). In different ways, each of these teams was looking for ways to take advantage of new, industrial materials and modernist principles, to produce more affordable housing more quickly. The initial developer for the project was Carl Koch, originator of the Techbuilt system of modular housing construction. Koch had already experimented with some of his design ideas at the Concord, Massachusetts community of Conantum.

== Architecture ==
The Turning Mill neighborhood was envisioned as a development of Techbuilt prefabricated houses, with 35 houses eventually built using this innovative methodology. Over time, other companies became involved in home construction there: specifically, the Architectural Planning Associates of Boston created three housing versions, the raised ranch, the split-level and the chalet; and developer Harmon White licensed the "Peacock Farm House" from Walter Pierce for reuse at Turning Mill. Of the 158 houses in the district, all but 12 reflect mid-century modern design principles.

== Neighborhood Conservation District ==
As homes in the area aged and market conditions began to favor "tear-downs" over repair, neighbors became concerned about preserving the unique characteristics of their neighborhood. Because the houses were already listed in Lexington's Comprehensive Cultural Resources Survey, there was year-long delay before a listed house could be demolished, and a required public hearing before the Lexington Historic Commission. In one publicized case, the homeowners reconsidered their plan to tear down their 1958 home, surprised by the intensity of local feeling. After much-needed renovations, the house in question still stands, more than 10 years after that hearing.

But realization that there was an ongoing threat caused the neighbors to look for new means of preservation. There was an interest in finding a means of protecting architectural resources that was less stringent than the state-governed Local Historic District status. To that end, an article was brought before Lexington's Town Meeting to create a Neighborhood Conservation District (NCD) status which was approved in 2016. Even before the new bylaw was approved, proponents of a Turning Mill NCD began to document the characteristics of the area that would make it worthy of protection. Following completion of the necessary documentation, the request received a positive vote in Lexington's Town Meeting in April 2018.
