= Vytautas Kašuba =

Lithuanian sculptor

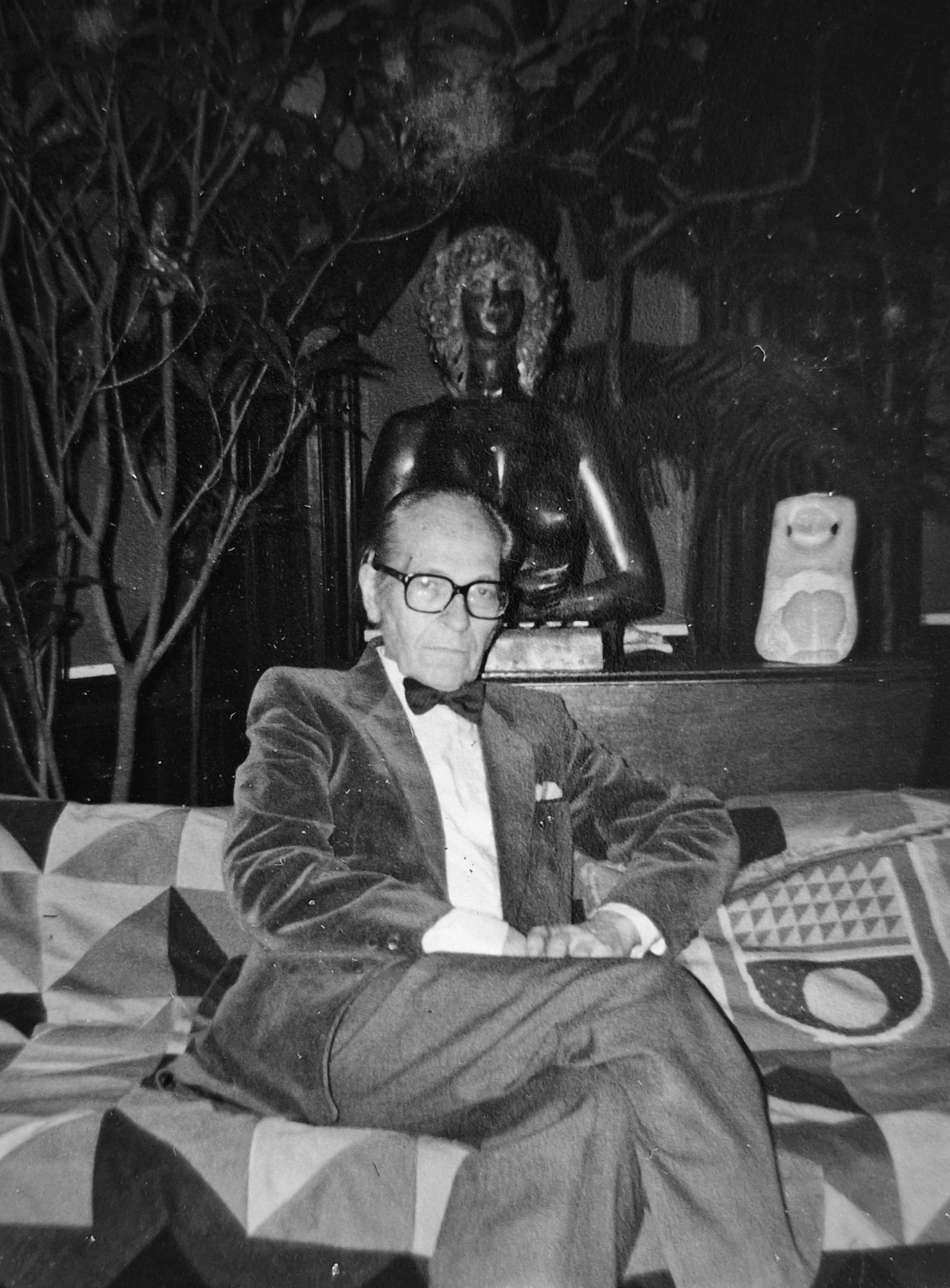
- Kašuba in 1986
- Born: Vytautas Košuba; August 15, 1915; Minsk, Minsk Governorate, Russian Empire
- Died: April 14, 1997 (aged 81); New York, United States
- Education: Kaunas School of Arts
- Occupation: Sculptor
- Spouse: Aleksandra Kašubienė
- Children: 2
- Awards: Lithuanian National Prize for Culture and Arts (1993); Order of Gediminas (1994)

Vytautas Kašuba (actual surname Košuba, 15 August 1915 – 14 April 1997) was a Lithuanian sculptor and honorary doctor of the Vilnius Academy of Arts (awarded in 1994). His major work is the Monument to Grand Duke Gediminas, a public sculpture in Vilnius, the capital city of Lithuania, commissioned in 1992 and erected in October 1996.

== Biography ==
=== Early life and education ===
Kašuba was born in Minsk on 15 August 1915, where his parents, who fled Lithuania during the World War I, lived. After returning to Lithuania, the family settled in Liudvinavas and later moved to Marijampolė. It was there where the sculptor grew up. Kašuba became interested in the arts as a child, apparently encouraged by his older brother, who taught painting at school.

After studying at Rygiškių Jonas Gymnasium, he moved to the newly opened Marijampolė School of Crafts and graduated from the woodcarving class in 1934. A year later, after working for a while in the workshop of sculptor Juozas Zikaras, he enrolled in and graduated from the Kaunas School of Arts in 1939.

=== Life in Lithuania ===
In 1942–1943, Kašuba became a lecturer in applied and decorative arts and sculpture and later the head of the department in Kaunas Institute of Applied and Decorative Arts. He assisted Juozas Mikėnas and Jonas Prapuolenis in the creation of their works. In 1937, at the Paris World Exhibition, Kašuba was awarded gold and silver medals for his statue of Rūpintojėlis and for carved ornaments on the furniture of Prapuolenis. During the Second World War, fearing the approaching Soviet army and possible deportation to Siberia he fled to Germany in 1944 with his future wife Aleksandra Fledžinskaitė and arrived in the United States in 1947.

=== Later life ===
After arriving in the United States, Kašuba and his family struggled like many other Lithuanian émigrés. By that time he and his wife Aleksandra had two children. Kašuba worked for a furniture company in New York until 1961.

== Career ==
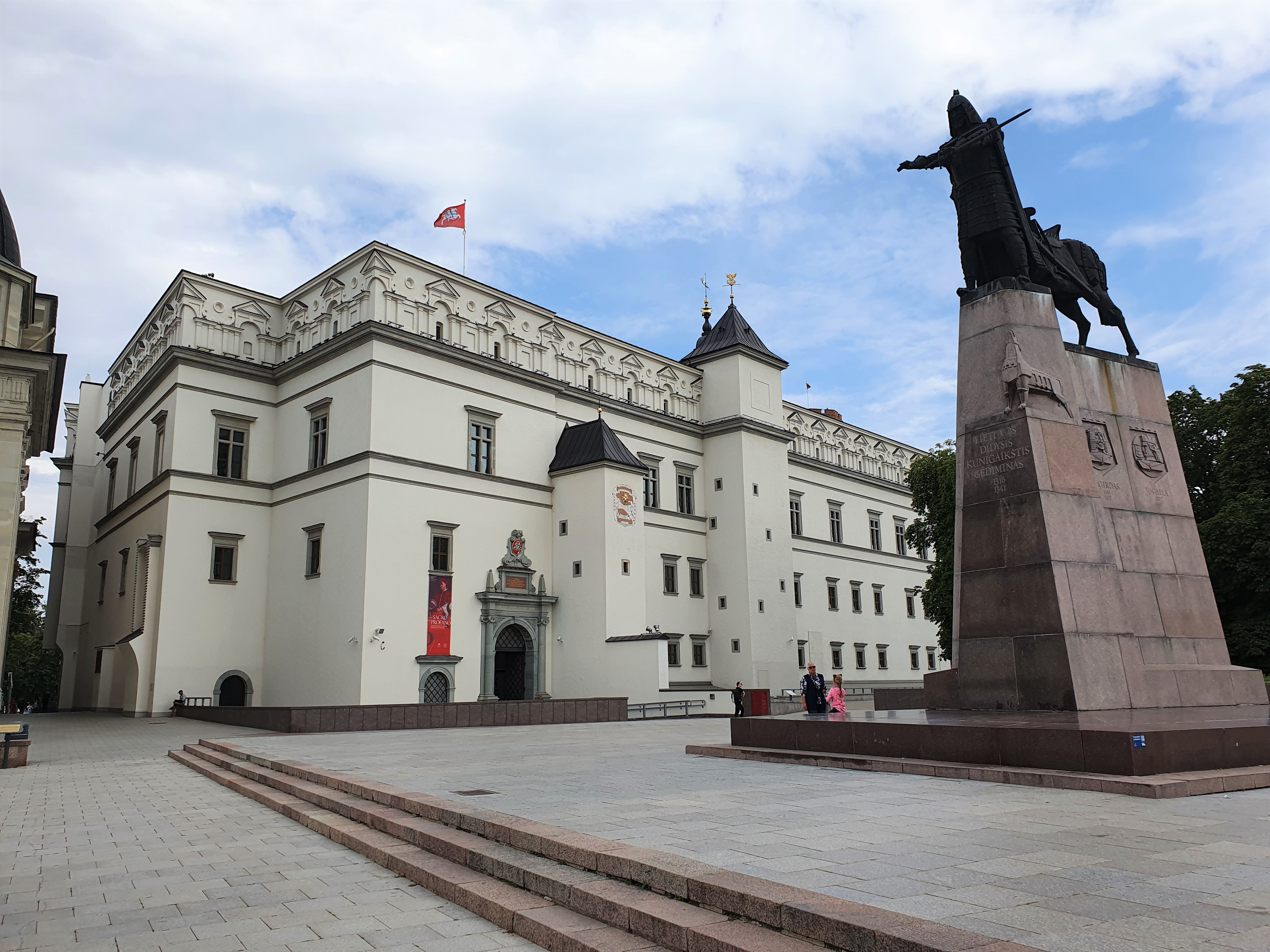
Kašuba's most famous work - Monument to Grand Duke Gediminas.

At the beginning of his career, Kašuba created monumental sculptures, during the Second World War, a relief - "Liberation of Prisoners" (1942), for which he was awarded a prize at the Lithuanian Artists Exhibition in Kaunas. Since 1952, he has mainly created reliefs in lead. In the 1980s he created sculptures (mainly portraits of women) in plaster, bronze and cast stone. In the 1980s, he created reliefs "The Journey", "The Journey of Being", "Day by Day".

Kašuba exhibited his works at the 1964 World's Fair in New York, Kašuba created wall relief panels of images of saints for the Vatican Pavilion, using and reviving the medieval technique of repoussé, which had not been used before in America. He participated in numerous other exhibitions in various cities around the world. In 1975, he was awarded the grand prize of the New York "Culture Hearth" for the project "Monument to Christianity. Mindaugas". In 1984, he received the Lithuanian-American Community Prize in Brooklyn, and in 1992 - the Grand Prize for the project "Monument to Gediminas". In 1993 Kašuba was awarded the Lithuanian National Prize for Culture and Art, and in 1994 he was awarded the Order of Gediminas, 3rd degree, for his services to Lithuanian culture. In 1994 Kašuba was awarded an honorary doctorate from the Vilnius Academy of Arts.
