= Edward A. Rath County Office Building =

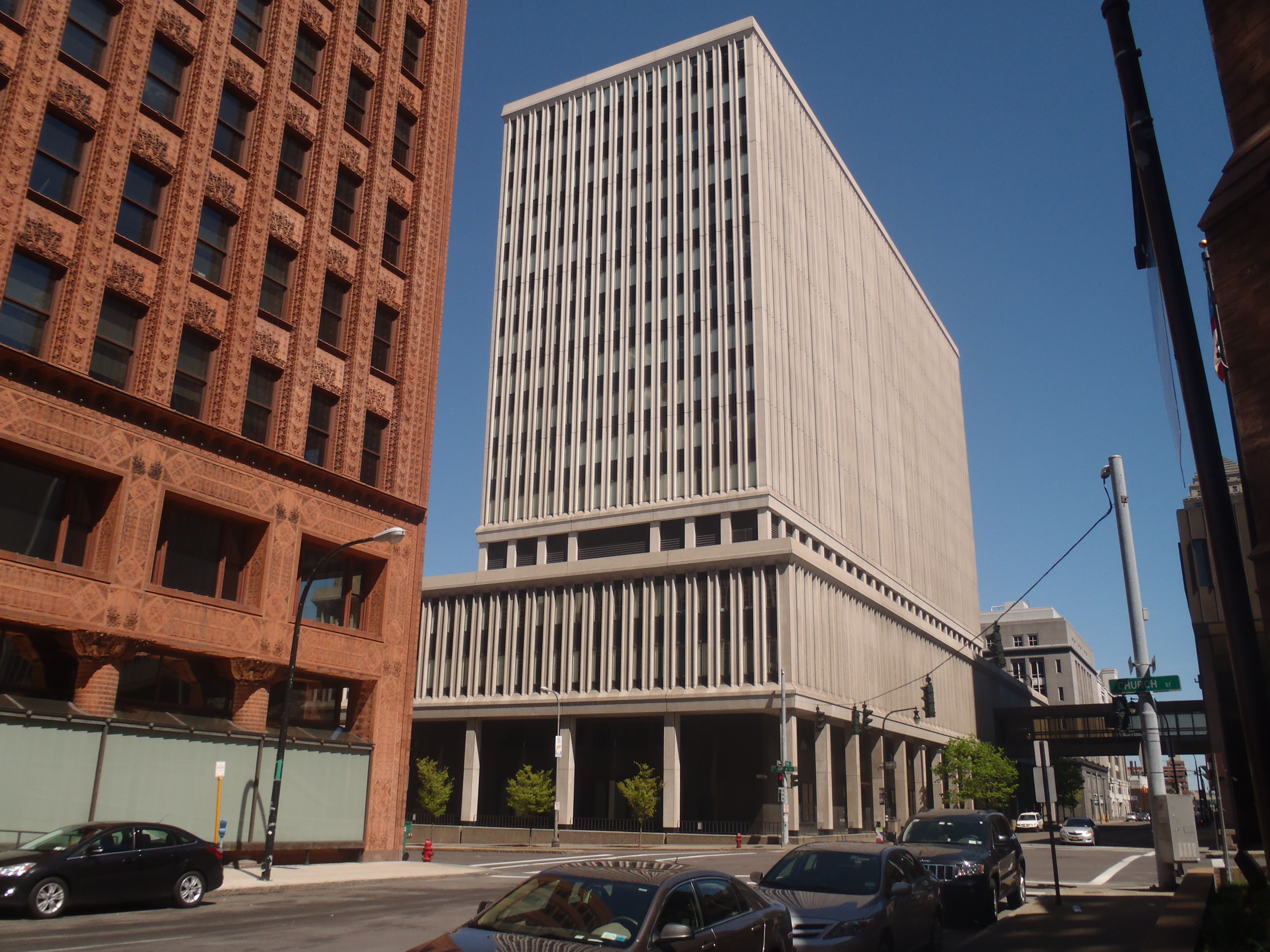

General information
- Status: Completed
- Type: Office
- Architectural style: International style
- Location: 95 Franklin Street, Buffalo, New York, United States
- Coordinates: 42.884019°N 78.876696°W
- Construction started: 1968
- Completed: 1969
- Cost: $15,662,339
- Owner: Erie County, New York

Height
- Roof: 233 ft (71 m)

Technical details
- Floor count: 16

Design and construction
- Architects: Milstein, Wittek, Davis & Hamilton; Backus, Crane & Love

Other information
- Parking: 90 spaces

The Edward A. Rath County Office Building is a high-rise (16-story) office building located at 95 Franklin Street, in Buffalo, New York, across from Erie County Hall and the Guaranty Building. The Rath building was named for Edward A. Rath, the first County Executive of Erie County. The building contains the Erie County Executive’s office, Department of Environment and Planning, Department of Motor Vehicles, Department of Public Works, the Office of Geographic Information Services, and a number of other county departments. It was designed by architectural firms Milstein, Wittek, Davis & Hamilton and Backus, Crane & Love, and constructed c. 1968.

== History ==
Several notable buildings existed on the current site prior to the Rath Building, including the:

- D. S. Morgan Building (1895–1965)

== See also ==
- List of tallest buildings in Buffalo, New York

== Gallery ==
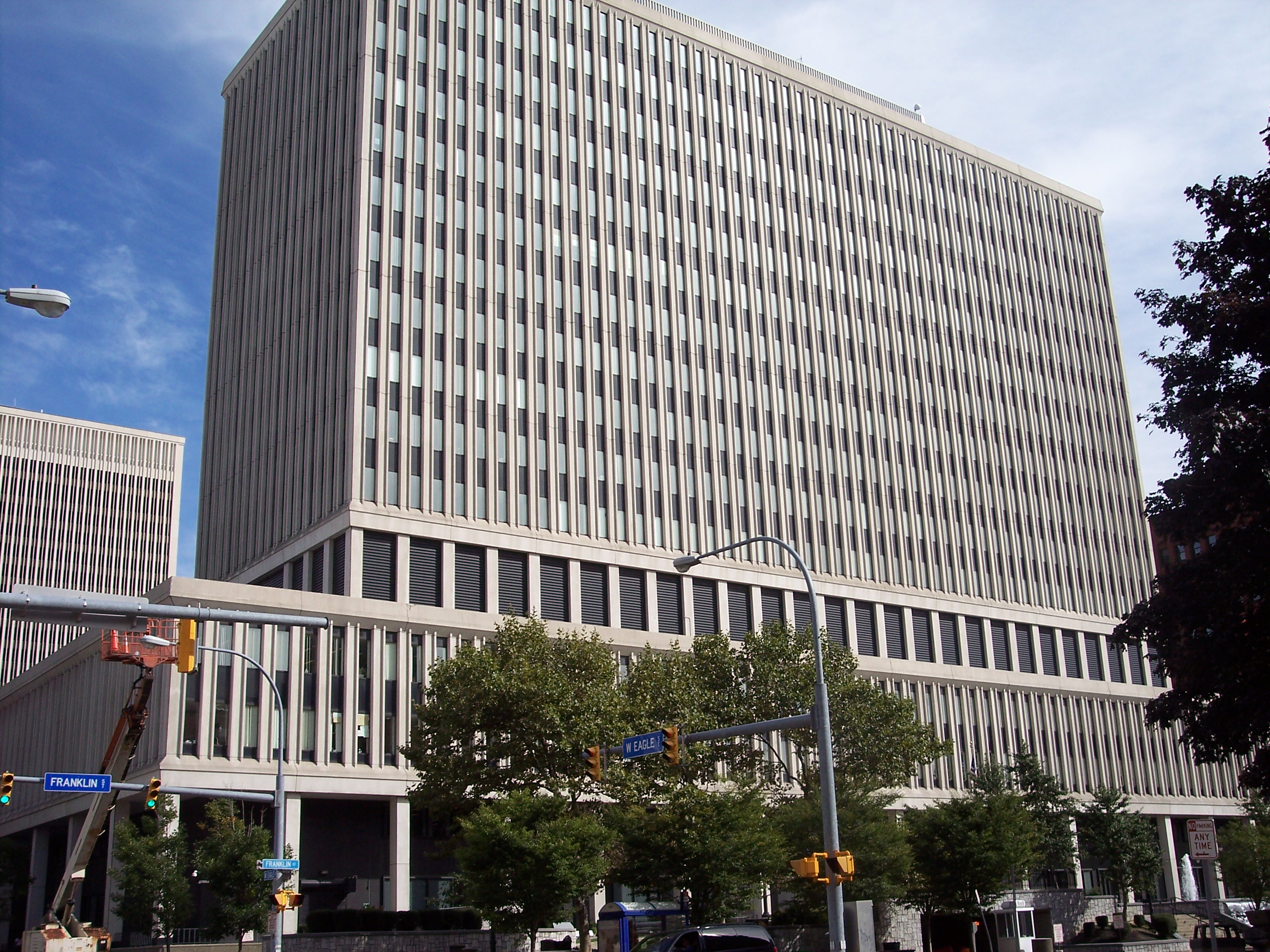
