= Carl Koch (architect) =

American architect

Albert Carl Koch
- Born: 11 May 1912; Milwaukee, Wisconsin
- Died: 3 July 1998 (aged 86); Cambridge, Massachusetts
- Occupation: Architect
- Practice: Carl Koch & Associates
- Buildings: Techbuilt System

Carl Koch (May 11, 1912 – July 3, 1998) was a noted American architect. He was most associated with the design of prefabricated homes and development of the Techcrete building system.

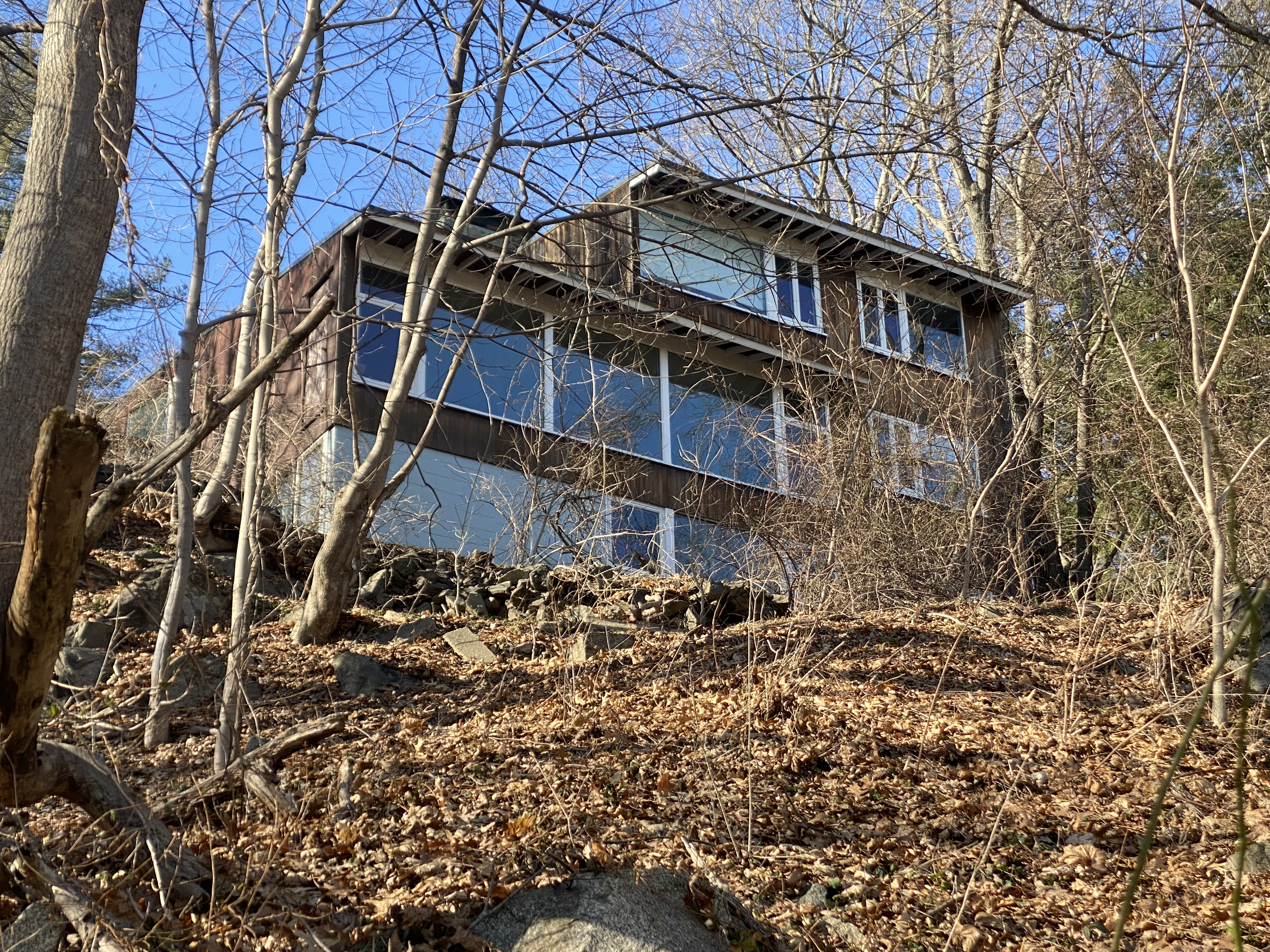
Carl Koch House on Snake Hill in Belmont, Massachusetts (1940) photographed in 2022

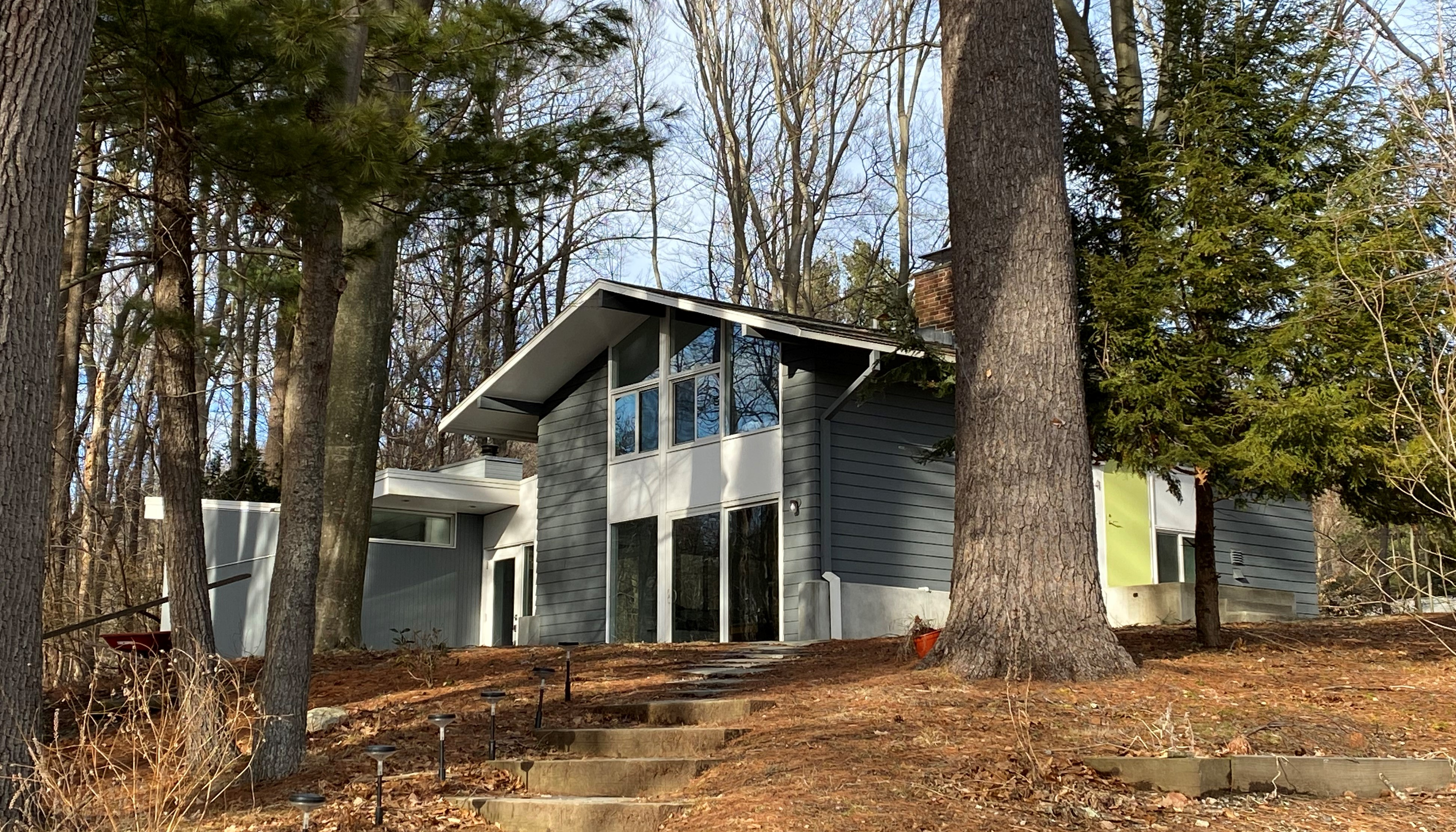
An early variant of Techbuilt House (1956) in the Turning Mill neighborhood of Lexington, Massachusetts photographed in 2022

== Early life and education ==
Albert Carl Koch, Jr. was born in Milwaukee, Wisconsin, on May 11, 1912. He was educated at Harvard College and received his Master of Architecture degree from the Harvard University Graduate School of Design (GSD), completing his studies in 1937. The time he spent at Harvard overlapped briefly with the arrival of Walter Gropius, founder of the Bauhaus in Germany, who had come to lead GSD.

Koch served in the U.S. Navy during World War II. In April 1944, he was recruited for transfer to the Monuments, Fine Arts, and Archives program of the Allied Military Government in the European Theater of Operations, where he served in Germany with other ‘Monuments Men.’

== Career ==
After completing his education, Koch moved to Sweden where he briefly worked for Modernist architect Sven Markelius. After his return to the United States he began teaching at Harvard University and also began work on Snake Hill in 1940, a set of modernist houses including one for himself in Belmont, Massachusetts. Focusing on how to address family needs economically, he eliminated all complicated details and expensive millwork. Land costs were low because of a very steep slope and ledge which made construction less attractive for conventional building. Koch's own house was arranged on three levels, the lowest of which was built into the granite ledge, which was left exposed inside the house. The development was hailed as "one of the best known and most significant groups of contemporary houses in the world" in a 1946 article in Progressive Architecture, with photographs by Ezra Stoller. The cost of the house in 1940 was $6,160. Evidence of the design's livability is the fact that the house is largely unmodified 80 years later.

In one of the earliest examples of prefabrication, in 1947 Koch and two associates created the "Acorn House", which was designed to be assembled from parts in one day and then be "demountable" so it could be easily transported to a new location. Although prototypes were built, the design never caught on, possibly due to resistance from local building officials and financers. Koch considered the Acorn House his "one best idea: one that in any reasonable world would have brought comfort to millions." The cost in 1949 was intended to be $4,500 of which all labor costs were supposed to be $350.

After a number of false starts in the design of housing that could be fabricated from parts, he finally met with success with the 1953 "Techbuilt" house. With 90 franchised "builder-dealers" using parts from 4 factories, it is estimated that there were eventually more than 3000 Techbuilt houses in 32 US states. In the Techbuilt house, the post and beam system (which makes interior walls non-loadbearing) combined with a variety of modular exterior wall panels (in 4' and 8' widths) allowing the buyer to easily customize the design. Architect William Berkes, who worked with Koch at Techbuilt, later founded Deck House Inc. in 1959.

In his 1958 book At Home with Tomorrow, Koch laid out a philosophy of an "industrial house" that could use prefabrication of parts to design homes that better suited people's needs and could be built quickly and affordably. He questioned the prevailing view that people primarily cared about having their house look like their neighbors'. Although to modern readers some of the gender assumptions about how people live are jarring, the basic ideas about the usefulness of prefabrication and flexible plans still ring true in the 21st century.

=== Larger Housing Developments ===
Koch was also a pioneer in cluster housing, initiating, in 1951, the 104-home Conantum in Concord, Massachusetts one of the first of its kind in New England. In later years, he became involved in large-scale housing projects in Boston and New York associated with the urban renewal movement. Urban renewal attempted to address what was thought of as urban decay and blight through large scale razing of existing buildings and neighborhoods, replacing them with new highrises. Early on, the implications of this approach came under fire, most persuasively by Jane Jacobs in The Death and Life of Great American Cities

While Koch's innovations were largely technical in nature, one of his projects, Academy Homes in Roxbury, Massachusetts, was the subject of neighborhood demonstrations with residents asking for more community control. Koch believed the goals of technological advancement and citizen involvement could be reconciled. He recommended that neighborhood residents be given a larger role in the Techrete construction process and in planning of the neighborhood itself.

=== An Early Example of "Adaptive Reuse" ===
In his project to transform Lewis Wharf into luxury housing, Koch embarked on a dual role of architect and developer. Completed in 1973, his reuse of the beautiful but obsolete 19th century structure predated the better-known redevelopment of historic Faneuil Hall Marketplace by architect Ben Thompson and developer James Rouse in 1976.

=== Projects ===
- Snake Hill, Massachusetts group of eight houses (1941)
- The Acorn House (1946)
- Conantum, group of 102 houses, Concord, MA (1951)
- Staff housing for the US Embassy, Belgrade (1956)
- Turning Mill/Middle Ridge, Lexington, Massachusetts (1956–1967)
- Academy Homes Boston, Massachusetts (1962)
- Eliot House, Mount Holyoke College (1962)
- Spruce Hill Road, Weston, Massachusetts (1956)
- Ocean Village/Arverne, for the Urban Development Corporation, New York City (1972)
- Lewis Wharf Boston, Massachusetts (1973)

=== Publications ===
- Koch, Carl; Lewis, Andy (1958). At Home with Tomorrow. New York: Rinehart & Company.
- Koch, Carl (1959), "Design and the Industrialized House", in Kelly, Burnham (ed.), Design and Production of Houses, New York: McGraw-Hill, pp. 83–111
- Koch, Carl; Lewis, Roger K. (1968). Roadblocks to Innovation in the Housing Industry. Washington: National Commission on Urban Problems.

=== Legacy ===
Carl Koch is known for his successful early designs for prefabricated housing. Progressive Architecture magazine gave him the unofficial title "The Grandfather of Prefab" in 1994. In total, over 3,000 Techbuilt homes were sold.

=== Awards ===
- First Award American Institute of Architects (1954)
- Frank P. Brown Pioneer Award of the Benjamin Franklin Institute of Technology (1967)
