= Aleksandra Kasuba =

Lithuanian-American environmental artist (1923–2019)

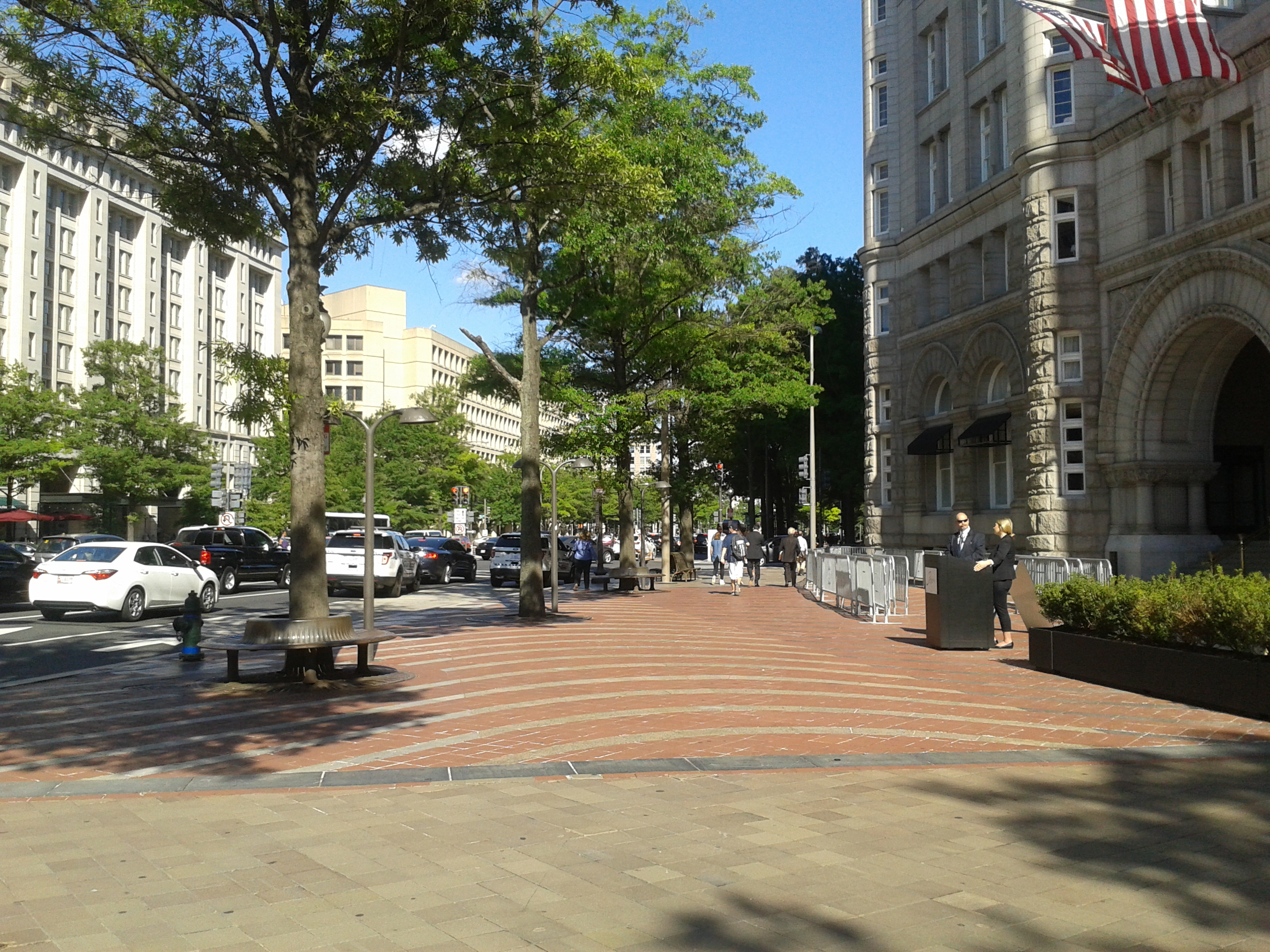
A plaza designed by Kasuba, in front of the Old Post Office Pavilion, now the Trump International Hotel Washington, D.C.

Aleksandra Kašubienė "Kasuba" (née Fledžinskaitė; (Note: Lithuanian pronunciation: [ˈflʲɛd͡ʒʲɪnʲsˌkɐɪ̯tʲeː]) January 10, 1923 – March 5, 2019) was a Lithuanian-American environmental artist.

Kasuba studied sculpture in her native country before emigrating to the United States with her husband Vytautas Kašuba in 1947, having spent the previous two years in Germany as a refugee. Much of her work, in materials such as marble and brick, is abstract and architectural in nature, and is fully integrated into nearby buildings. Examples may be seen at the Rochester Institute of Technology; Lincoln Hospital in the Bronx; the Bank of California Building in Portland, Oregon; the headquarters of the Container Corporation of America in Chicago; and the plaza in front of the Old Post Office Pavilion, today the Trump International Hotel Washington, D.C. She also produced a design for the Amherst Street station of Buffalo Metro Rail. In addition to her sculptural work, she has received architectural awards for designs made of stretched fabric. Interested in the exchange of ideas, she collaborated with Experiments in Art and Technology (E.A.T.) during the 1960s.

Kasuba lived in New York and New Mexico during her career. A collection of her papers is currently held by the Archives of American Art of the Smithsonian Institution. She was the subject of a retrospective at the National Art Gallery in Vilnius in 2015. Her first UK museum exhibition was at Tate St Ives in 2026.
