= Lexington High School (Massachusetts) =

Public high school in Massachusetts, United States

Location
- 251 Waltham Street; Lexington, Massachusetts 02421; United States; 42°26′37″N 71°13′57″W

Information
- Type: Public high school
- Motto: Joy in learning, curiosity in life, and compassion in all we do
- Established: 1854
- School district: Lexington Public Schools
- NCES District ID: 2506840
- Superintendent: Julie Hackett
- CEEB code: 221190
- Principal: Andrew Baker
- Faculty: 204.12 (on an FTE basis)
- Enrollment: 2,318 (2023–24)
- Student to teacher ratio: 11.36
- Colors: Blue and Gold
- Nickname: Minutemen
- Accreditation: New England Association of Schools and Colleges; Massachusetts State Department of Education
- Newspaper: The Musket
- Feeder schools: Jonas Clarke Middle School; William Diamond Middle School
- Nobel laureates: Carolyn Bertozzi, Drew Weissman
- Website: www.lexingtonma.org/lexingtonhighschool

Lexington High School (LHS) is a public high school located in Lexington, Massachusetts, United States, serving students in ninth through twelfth grade. It is one of two high schools in Lexington, and is part of the Lexington Public Schools system. Its sports teams compete in division 1 of Massachusetts Interscholastic Athletic Association (MIAA)'s 4th district.

== Campus ==
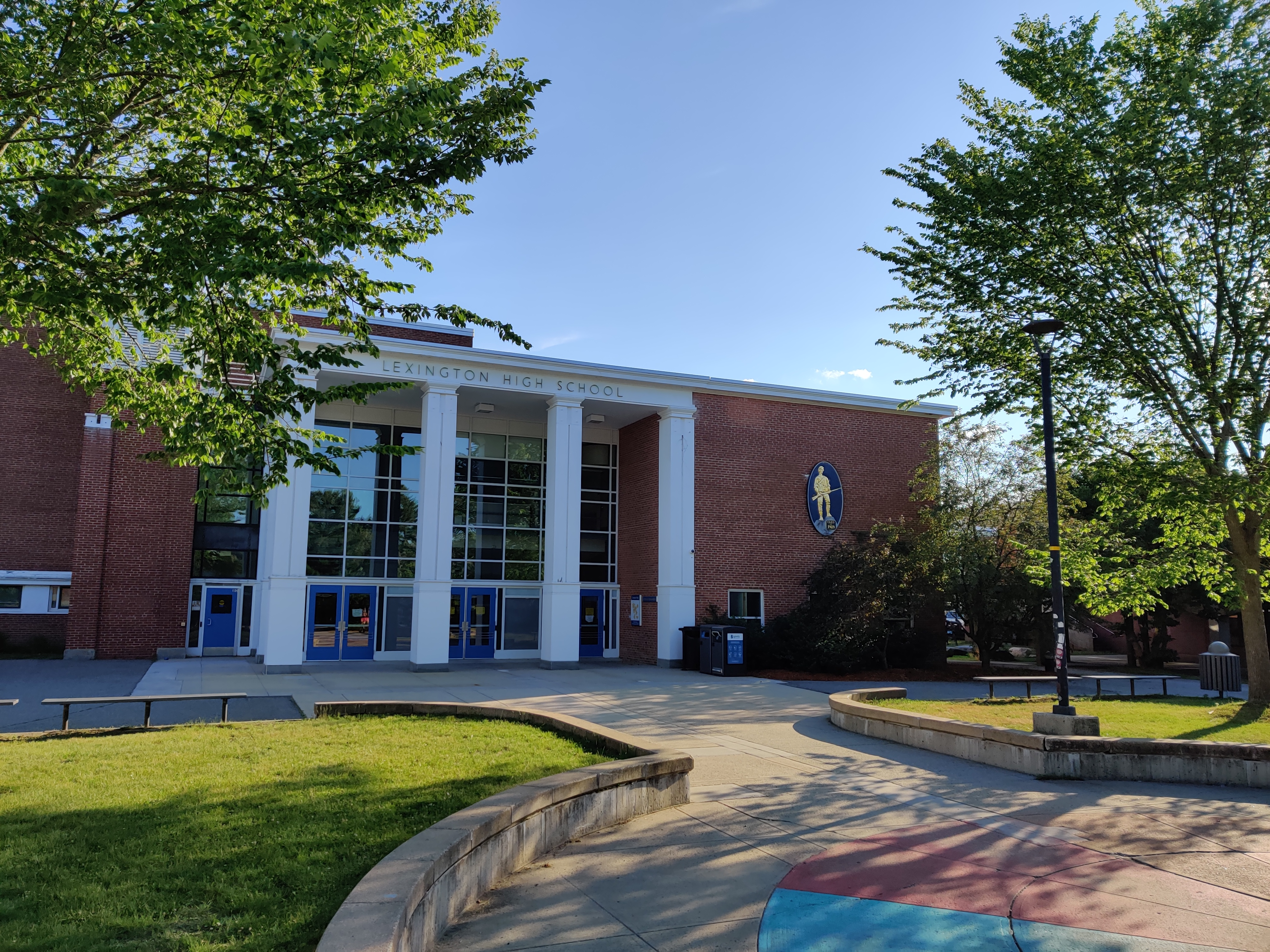
LHS main building and Quad in summer 2020.

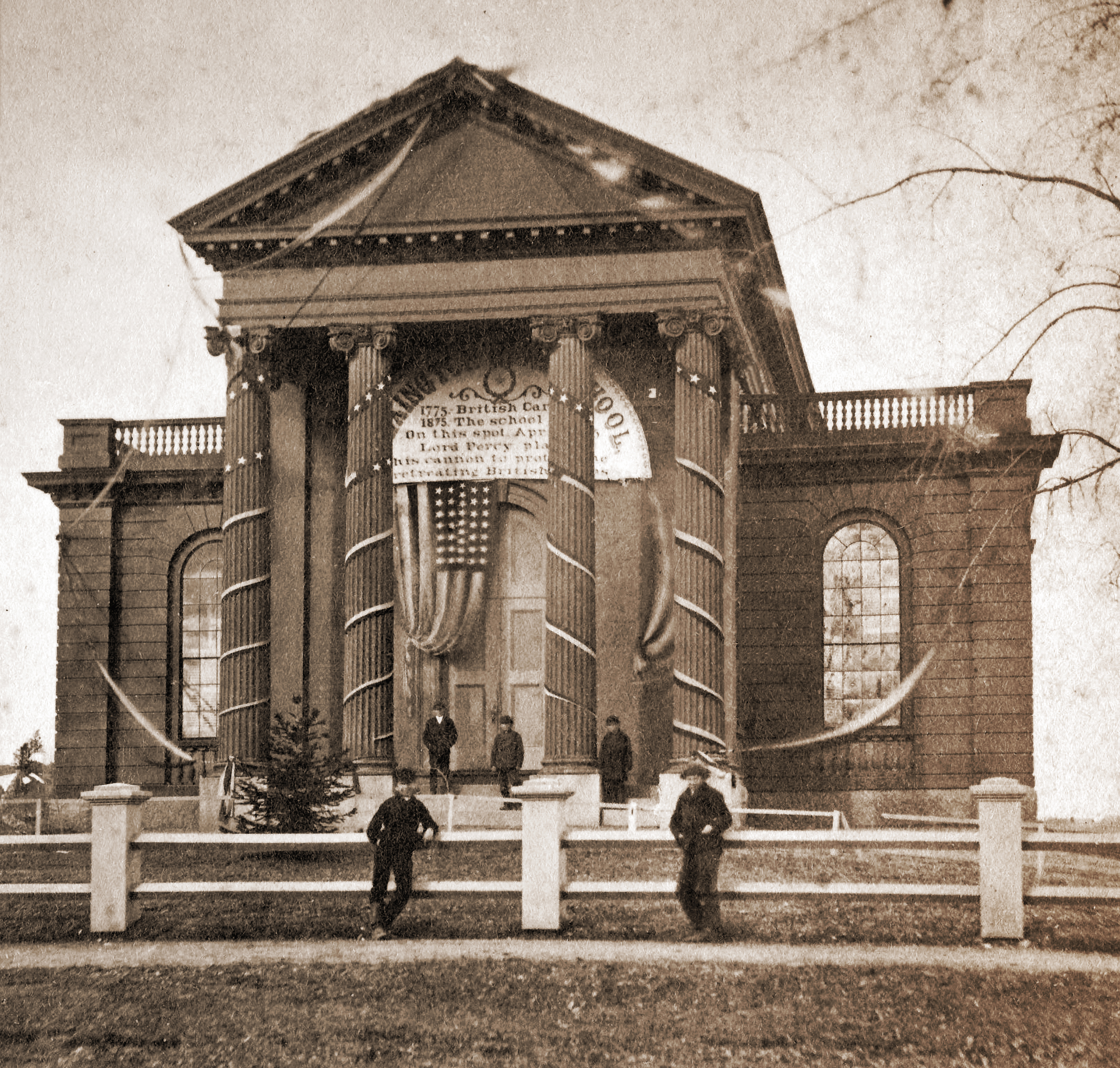
Lexington High School originally occupied this building from 1854 to 1902.

=== Existing ===
Lexington High School's campus consists of a central quadrangle (Quad), four main academic buildings (Arts & Humanities, World Language, Mathematics, Science), a field house, and a pair of modular classrooms (mods). The Quad is bounded by the Arts & Humanities building (on two sides), the Science building, and a covered walkway between the Science building and the World Language building.

=== Future Plans ===
Lexington High School's buildings suffer from a lack of space, an aging construction, and congestion. 100% of the science classrooms and 30% of general education classrooms do not meet the Massachusetts School Building Authority (MSBA) standards for recommended square footage, and the school received a "Does Not Meet Standard" on the New England Association of Schools and Colleges (NEASC) review of its campus in 2008 and 2020.

The preferred solution is construction of a new school, starting in late 2026 and with completion planned for the 2029–2030 academic year. Dore+Whittier have been selected as the Owner's Project Manager, and SMMA as the Designer.

== Students and faculty ==
As of the 2023-24 school year, LHS had an enrollment of 2,318. With 184.4 classroom teachers (on a FTE basis), the school operates with a student–teacher ratio of 12.2:1. There were 135 students (6.5% of enrollment) eligible for free lunch and 29 (1.4% of students) eligible for reduced-cost lunch. The Asian student population has increased substantially in the 21st century, growing from 15% in 1999-2000 to 46% in 2023-24.

The math department of the Lexington Public Schools system has received national merit through the Mathematical Association of America, as the Edyth May Sliffe Award has been won by 8 Lexington Public Schools teachers (5 from the high school, and 3 from the middle schools) a total of 11 times. Lexington High School also has the most two-time winners (3 teachers; no teacher can win it more than twice).

== Rankings ==
In 2021, LHS has been recognized by US News and Niche.com as the 2nd and 3rd ranked traditional (non-charter) public high school, respectively, in Massachusetts.

== Academic competition ==
=== Debate ===
Lexington High School has a debate program consisting of three divisions: Lincoln–Douglas, Policy, and Public Forum, all taught as elective courses. LHS has won all three major divisions at the Tournament of Champions (TOC). It has also had winners or runners-up at National Catholic Forensic League, National Debate Coaches Association, and National Speech and Debate Association. As of 2019, Lexington's debate team has won both the Policy division and the Sweepstakes Award at the State Championship for the last 45 years.

Lexington won the Policy division at the TOC in 1994. A Lexington team won the TOC in the Public Forum division in 2007. Lexington won the Lincoln-Douglas debate division at the TOC in 2012. In 2020, Lexington again won the TOC in Lincoln-Douglas. Lexington has won top speakers awards at the NDCA in Lincoln-Douglas (2012) and Public Forum (2017), and at the TOC in Policy (1986, 1995).

The Director of Debate at Lexington High School is Sheryl Kaczmarek. In 2022, she was inducted into the Tournament of Champions hall of fame.

=== Chess ===
The Lexington High School chess team won the Massachusetts State Chess Championship in 2011, 2013, and 2014. In 2009, the team placed 2nd in the freshman section of the annual National K-12 Scholastic Championship in Dallas, Texas. In 2010, the team placed 2nd in the Rhode Island State Championship.

=== Science ===
Lexington High School competes in the National Science Bowl, National Ocean Sciences Bowl, Envirothon, and Science Olympiad. In the National Science Bowl, LHS has placed first five times, tying with Mira Loma High School for the most first-place finishes. In the National Ocean Sciences Bowl, LHS won the national competition between 1998 and 2002, the first five years of the competition's existence, giving it more wins than any other school. LHS won the Envirothon in 2022, 2023, and 2025.

== Athletics and sports ==
Lexington High competes within division 1 of Massachusetts Interscholastic Athletic Association’s 4th district as a member the Middlesex League.

Lexington High School offers the following sports:

Fall Sports
Sport	Gender	Team Levels	Divisional Championship (Years)	All-State Championship (Years)
Cross Country	Boys	Varsity, JV	Div. I (1958, 1959, 1988, 2018)	—
Cross Country	Girls	Varsity, JV	Div. I (2000, 2001, 2014, 2016, 2018, 2019, 2025)	All-State (2001, 2016, 2025)
Football	Boys	Varsity, JV, Freshman	—	—
Field Hockey	Girls	Varsity, JV, Freshman	—	—
Golf	Co-ed	Varsity	—	—
Soccer	Boys	Varsity, JV, Freshman	Div. I (2016)	—
Soccer	Girls	Varsity, JV, Freshman	—	—
Swimming	Girls	Varsity	—	—
Volleyball	Girls	Varsity, JV, Freshman	—	—
Cheerleading	Co-ed	Football season	—	—

Winter Sports
Sport	Gender	Team Levels	Divisional Championship (Years)	All-State Championship (Years)
Alpine Skiing	Boys & Girls	Varsity	—	—
Basketball	Boys	Varsity, JV, Freshman	4 state titles (1960s–70s, incl. 1978)	—
Basketball	Girls	Varsity, JV, Freshman	—	—
Ice Hockey	Boys	Varsity, JV	—	—
Ice Hockey	Girls	Varsity, JV	—	—
Indoor Track & Field	Boys	Varsity, JV	Div. I (1970, 1976, 2006, 2007, 2015, 2016)	All-State (1970, 1994, 2007)
Indoor Track & Field	Girls	Varsity, JV	Div. I (1986, 1989, 1990, 1991, 2013, 2025, 2026)	All-State (1990)
Swimming	Boys	Varsity	—	—
Wrestling	Boys	Varsity, JV	—	—
Cheerleading	Co-ed	Basketball season	—	—

Spring Sports
Sport	Gender	Team Levels	Divisional Championship (Years)	All-State Championship (Years)
Baseball	Boys	Varsity, JV, Freshman	—	—
Lacrosse	Boys	Varsity, JV, Freshman	—	—
Lacrosse	Girls	Varsity, JV, Freshman	—	—
Outdoor Track & Field	Boys	Varsity, JV	Class B (1937, 1960) Div. I (1994, 2007, 2023)	All-State (1994, 2007)
Outdoor Track & Field	Girls	Varsity, JV	Div. I (2025, 2026)	All-State (1987, 1998)
Softball	Girls	Varsity, JV, Freshman	Div. I (2008, 2009)	—
Tennis	Boys	Varsity, JV	—	—
Tennis	Girls	Varsity, JV	—	—
Ultimate Frisbee	Boys	Varsity, JV	State (2013, 2015)	—
Ultimate Frisbee	Girls	Varsity	—	—
Volleyball	Boys	Varsity	—	—

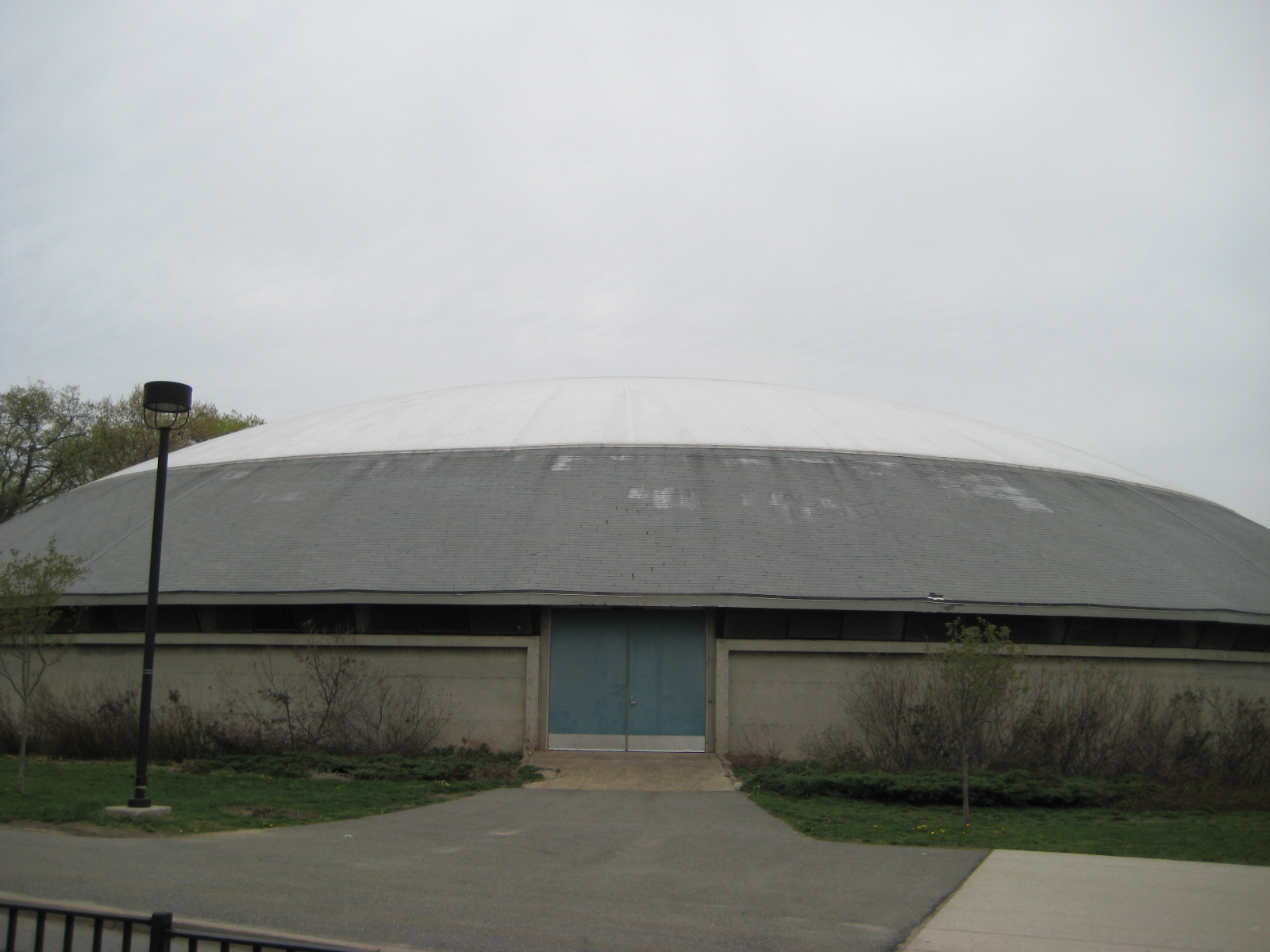
The high school's field house

== Extracurriculars ==
=== GSA ===
In 2005, Fred Phelps, of Topeka, Kansas, and his church (the Westboro Baptist Church) protested the Lexington High School graduation because of the school's support of its gay-straight alliance. The group returned in 2009.

=== Drama ===
The Lexington High School Drama Company is a student and staff run production company that puts on two annual productions (A spring musical and a fall play) among other events. The company consists of the cast, crew, costumes, pit orchestra, and improv troupe.

=== The Musket ===
The Musket is the school newspaper. Until 1965, the school newspaper was called The High-Spot.

In 1997 The Musket ran into controversy by refusing to run an abstinence ad. The paper's First Amendment rights were maintained with the victory in Yeo v Town of Lexington, a case argued in the United States Court of Appeals for the First Circuit.

== Notable alumni ==
- Orny Adams, comedian and writer
- Michael Arnowitt, pianist and composer
- Andrea Bertozzi, academic
- Carolyn Bertozzi (1984), chemist and Nobel laureate
- James MacGregor Burns, historian
- Kurt Busiek, writer
- Dawen, singer-songwriter
- Dave DeGuglielmo, National Football League (NFL) football coach
- Dane DiLiegro (2006), actor and former professional basketball player
- Rachel Dratch (1984), actress, comedian, writer
- Brad Ellis, musician
- Steven Feifke, musician
- Sal Frelick, MLB Player, World Series Champion
- Xyla Foxlin, engineer and YouTuber
- Richard Friedenberg, screenwriter
- Bathsheba Grossman, sculptor
- Lev Grossman (1987), novelist and journalist
- Pete Holmes (1997), comedian
- Mehran Khaghani (1994), comedian
- James Kvaal (1992), undersecretary of education in the Biden administration
- Jon Landau, music critic, manager and record producer
- Michael Larsen (1980), mathematician
- Ron Lee, National Basketball Association (NBA) basketball player
- Zachary Lemnios (1972), Assistant Secretary of Defense
- Les McClaine (1995), cartoonist and animation designer
- Scott McCloud (1978), cartoonist and comics theorist
- Bill McKibben (1977), environmentalist and writer
- Dinny McNamara, former MLB player (Boston Braves)
- Eugene Mirman (1992), comedian, writer, and filmmaker
- Russell Morash (1953), television producer and creator, This Old House and Cooking with Julia Child
- Catherine Murphy (1963), artist
- Don Nottebart (1954), Houston Astros baseball player
- Ryan Jude Novelline (2008), contemporary artist and fashion designer
- Meghan O'Sullivan (1987), official in administration of George W. Bush
- Amanda Palmer (1994), musical performer, composer, and member of the duo The Dresden Dolls
- Dafna Hochman Rand (1996), official in administrations of Barack Obama and Joseph Biden
- Matt Reynolds, assistant coach for the Boston Celtics
- Chris Shaw (2012), professional baseball player, San Francisco Giants
- Bob Sheridan (1962), boxing announcer, Don King Productions
- Tom Silva (1965), general contractor and on-screen personality for This Old House
- Amy Smith (1980 or '81), mechanical engineer, MacArthur Fellow
- Bill Staines (1964), folk music artist
- Mark Stetson (1969), visual effects artist, Academy Award winner, Best Visual Effects, for his work on the film The Lord of the Rings: The Fellowship of the Ring
- William G. Tapply (1958), author of Brady Coyne mystery series
- Melanie Thernstrom (1982), author
- Rumay Wang aka Hafu (gamer), Twitch streamer
- Drew Weissman (1977), immunologist and Nobel laureate
- Ethan Zohn (1992), winner of Survivor: Africa
