= Dave DeGuglielmo =

American football player and coach (born 1968)

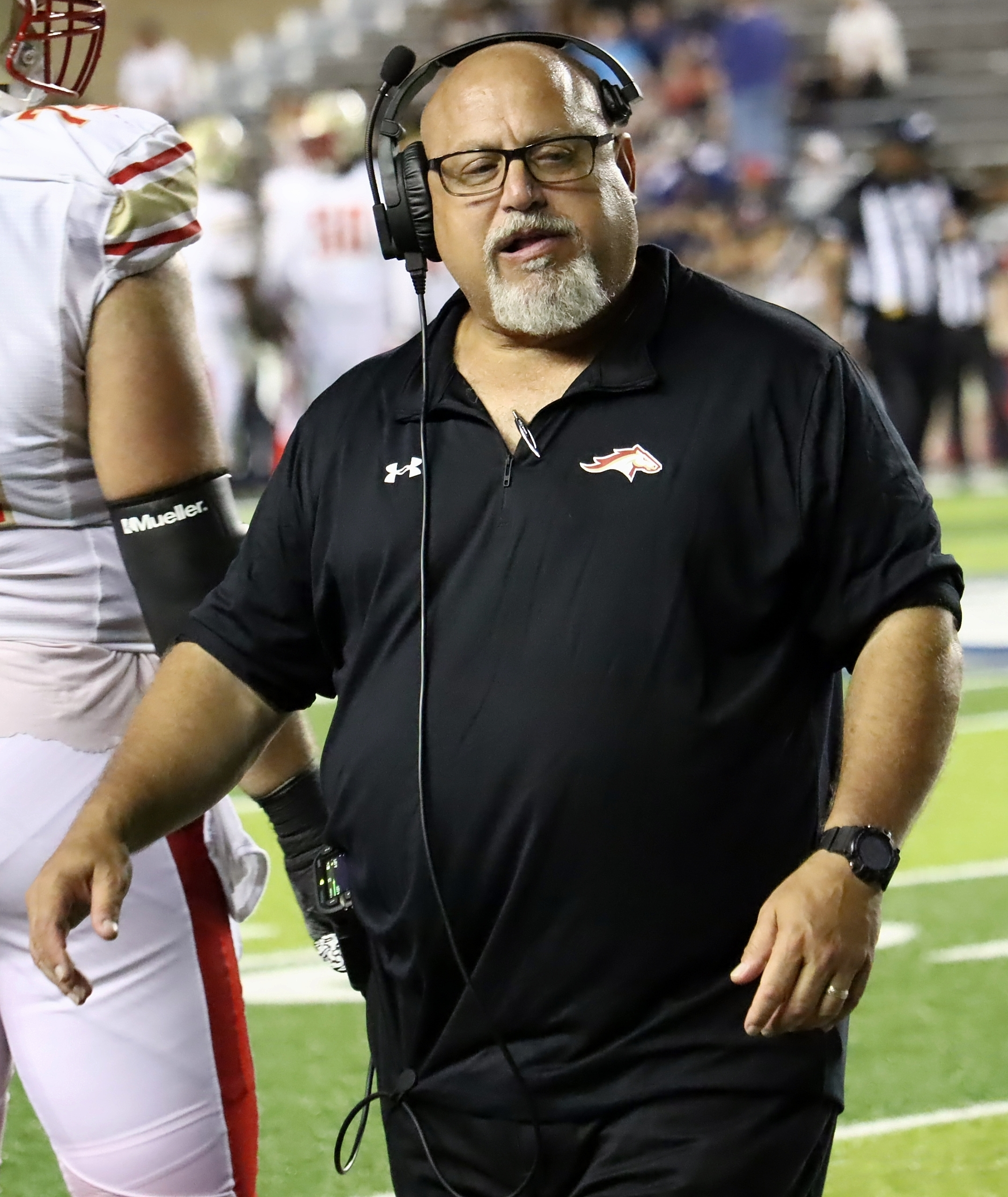
- DeGuglielmo with the Birmingham Stallions in 2024

Stanford Cardinal football
- Title: Senior offensive analyst

Personal information
- Born: July 15, 1968 (age 58); Cambridge, Massachusetts, U.S.

Career information
- High school: Lexington High School (Lexington, Massachusetts)
- College: Boston University

Career history
- Boston College (1991–1992) Graduate assistant; Boston University (1993–1996) Assistant head coach & offensive line coach; Connecticut (1997–1998) Offensive line coach; South Carolina (1999–2003) Offensive line coach; New York Giants (2004–2008) Assistant offensive line & quality control coach; Miami Dolphins (2009–2011) Offensive line coach; New York Jets (2012) Offensive line coach; New England Patriots (2014–2015) Offensive line coach; San Diego Chargers (2016) Assistant offensive line coach; Miami Dolphins (2017) Offensive line coach; Indianapolis Colts (2018) Offensive line coach; Miami Dolphins (2019) Offensive line coach; New York Giants (2020) Offensive line coach; Louisiana Tech (2021) Offensive line coach; Boston College (2022) Offensive line coach; Birmingham Stallions (2024–2025) Offensive line coach; Stanford (2025–present) Senior offensive anaylst

Awards and highlights
- 2× Super Bowl champion (XLII, XLIX); UFL champion (2024)

Dave DeGuglielmo (/ˌdeɪɡuːlˈjɛlmoʊ/ DAY-gool-YEL-moh; born July 15, 1968) is an American football coach for the Stanford Cardinal as a senior offensive analyst. He has previously been offensive line coach for the NFL's New York Jets, Miami Dolphins, New England Patriots, Indianapolis Colts, and New York Giants. DeGuglielmo was part of two Super Bowl-winning teams in his coaching career; the 2007 New York Giants and 2014 New England Patriots.

== Early life ==
DeGuglielmo was born in Cambridge, Massachusetts, and was raised in Lexington, Massachusetts. One of three children (an older brother Charlie, and younger a Sister Cristina), he is first generation Italian-American, as his father (Carmine Giuseppe DeGuglielmo / legally changed his name to Charles Joseph DeGuglielmo) emigrated to the US in 1954 with his family as a teenager, from a village outside of Avellino, Italy. His mother (June Dorothy Galassi) was born in Boston, and of Italian and French Canadian heritage.

== Playing career ==
DeGuglielmo played both offensive and defensive tackle at Lexington High School under legendary Massachusetts high school football coach, Bill Tighe. During that time, Lexington High School won two Middlesex League Championships and played for the Division I Super Bowl title against nationally ranked Brockton High School (MA). Moving on to play collegiately at Boston University, he red-shirted his first year (1986) at BU. Despite being a non-scholarship "walk-on," he ultimately became a four-year letterman at Boston University from 1987 to 1990. DeGuglielmo trained under world-renowned strength and conditioning guru, Mike Boyle, who was at the time the Terriers' head strength and conditioning coach. Playing for three different head coaches in five years, and three different offensive line coaches in his first three seasons, he persevered and was voted captain of the 1990 Terriers. The second of his head coaches was Chris Palmer, future head coach of the Cleveland Browns. Palmer and DeGuglielmo would reunite in 2007 at the NY Giants. His final offensive line coach was Tony Sparano, who went on to become the head football coach of the Miami Dolphins. Sparano would later hire Deguglielmo as his offensive line coach in Miami. Playing both guard and center, DeGuglielmo was a first-team All-New England selection as well as a two-time Academic All-Yankee Conference selection.

== Coaching career ==
=== New York Giants (first stint) ===
DeGuglielmo left UCF within a month, joining the New York Giants staff as an assistant offensive line coach under head coach Tom Coughlin whom he had served as a graduate assistant at Boston College 13 years earlier. In his tenure, the Giants made the playoffs four consecutive years, won Super Bowl XLII, and set a franchise record for rushing yards (2,518) and yards per carry (5.0) in 2008.

=== Miami Dolphins (first stint) ===
From 2009 to 2011 he was the offensive line coach for the Miami Dolphins. In 2011 the Dolphins rushed for 1,987 yards in what was also Reggie Bush's first 1,000-yard season.

=== New York Jets ===
DeGuglielmo was named the New York Jets' offensive line coach on January 24, 2012. He was fired in 2013.

=== New England Patriots ===
On January 22, 2014, the New England Patriots announced they had hired DeGuglielmo as the new offensive line coach to replace Dante Scarnecchia, who retired after 30 years with the team; DeGuglielmo had a preliminary agreement to serve as offensive line coach at University of Maryland six days prior to the Patriots' announcement. DeGuglilemo won a second Super Bowl ring in the Patriots' Super Bowl XLIX win over the Seattle Seahawks. The offensive line fared worse in 2015, and was ravaged with injuries, including a season-ending injury to left tackle Nate Solder. He was fired by the Patriots on January 25, 2016, one day after the Patriots' offensive line "collapse[d]" in the AFC Championship game against the Denver Broncos.

=== San Diego Chargers ===
In 2016 he worked as the assistant offensive line coach for the Chargers.

=== Miami Dolphins (second stint) ===
In 2017 he worked as the offensive line coach for the Dolphins under Adam Gase.

=== Indianapolis Colts ===
In 2018, DeGuglielmo was hired to be the offensive line coach for the Indianapolis Colts by Josh McDaniels and was retained by Frank Reich when he took the position of head coach. However, he was fired after the 2018 season.

=== Miami Dolphins (third stint) ===
On July 29, 2019, just four days into training camp, the Miami Dolphins dismissed offensive line coach Pat Flaherty and promoted DeGuglielmo to the position. DeGuglielmo had previously been hired as a team analyst.

=== New York Giants (second stint) ===
DeGuglielmo was hired as the Giants offensive line coach under Joe Judge midway through the season, replacing the terminated Marc Colombo. DeGuglielmo tested positive for COVID-19 and missed the team's week 17 game against the Dallas Cowboys on January 3, 2021.

=== Louisiana Tech ===
DeGuglilemo was hired by Louisiana Tech as their offensive line coach on February 3, 2021.

=== Boston College ===
In February 2022, DeGuglielmo was hired as the offensive line coach on Jeff Hafley's staff at Boston College. On February 2, 2023, it was reported that Boston College was parting ways with DeGuglielmo.

=== Birmingham Stallions ===
On February 17, 2024, it was revealed that DeGuglielmo would serve as the offensive line coach for the Birmingham Stallions of the United Football League (UFL).

=== Stanford ===
In 2025, DeGuglielmo was hired by Stanford as a senior offensive analyst.
