= Willard's Woods =

Conservation area in Lexington, Massachusetts

Coordinates: 42.468°N 71.222°W

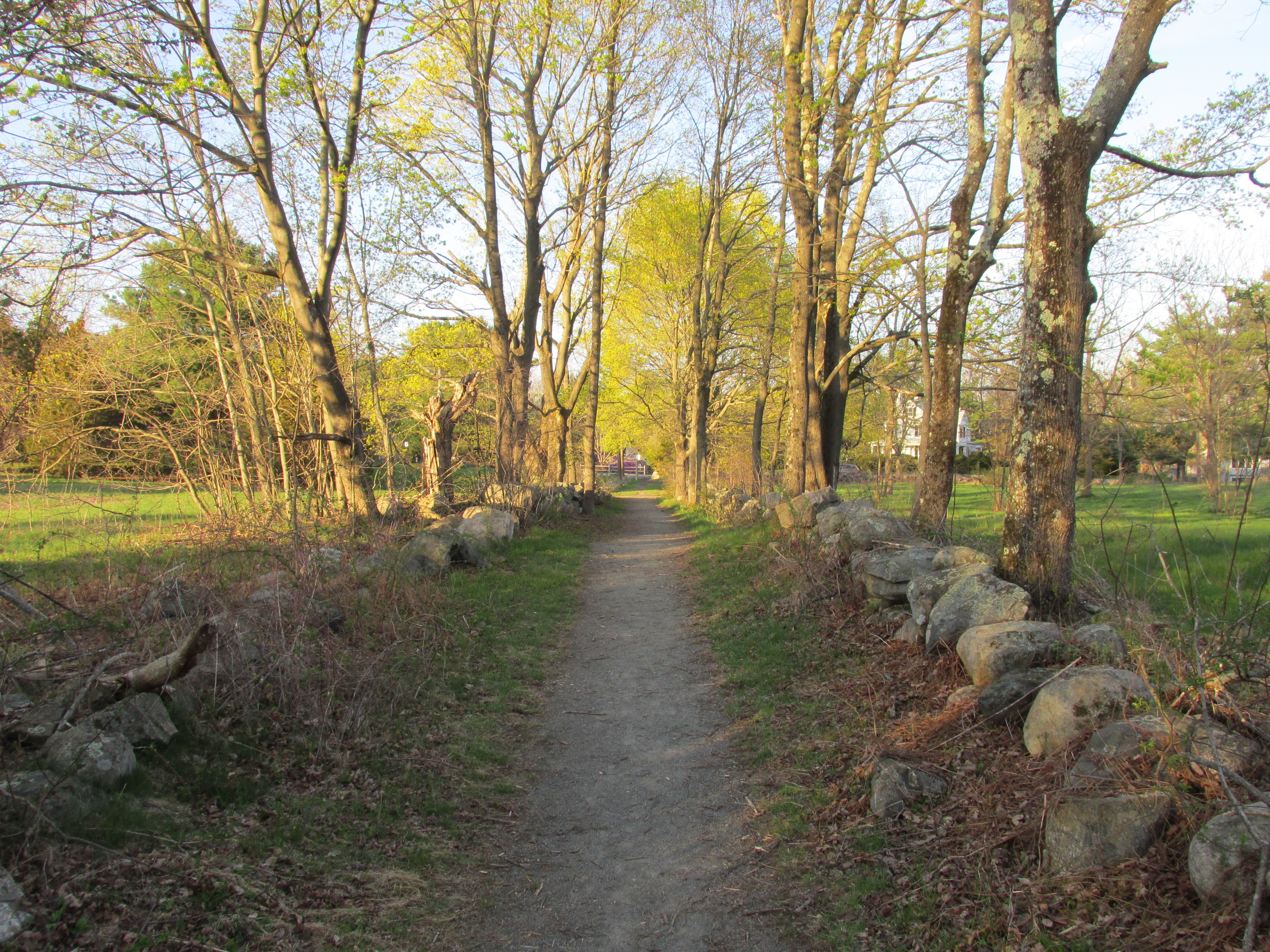
Trail off North Street

Willard's Woods is a 100-acre (0.40 km^{2}) conservation area located in Lexington, Massachusetts. It was first founded as a large orchard farm in the 1870s, and has since expanded and become a popular recreational area, with three miles of trails, two streams running through it, a nice boardwalk type path near a pond, a bike path going from opposite ends of the woods, and a variety of plants and wildlife.

== Geography ==
Willard's Woods contains a variety of amenities and sites. The wooded area has more than three miles of trails that allow visitors to walk through the open meadows, pine groves, and wetlands of the former orchard farm. It also has two streams running through it, a small pond near the North Street entrances, and a bike path stretching from Brent Road and Hathaway Street to North Street.

== Plants and wildlife ==
A large variety of wildlife resides in Willard's Woods, including several deer, fox, opossum, raccoon, and bird species. In the meadow area, Willard's has a variety of wildflowers and occasionally has asparagus plants.

== Leashing of dogs controversy ==
Over the course of several years, Willard's Woods have had issues with controlling of pet dogs. On June 8, 2010, residents of Lexington met to discuss the possibility of restricting the access of dogs to the park: requiring all dogs to be leashed, prohibiting dogs in certain parts of the park, or a hybrid combination of the two. However, some residents continued to speak out against the possibility of new restrictions. In November 2011, dogs were required to be leashed on the weekends and could be unleashed on weekdays, but only if the owner could see the dog and quickly have the dog return with the owner. Owners were also prohibited from bringing more than two dogs into the park and were also required to pick up any feces left behind by their dogs.
