= Michelson's Shoes =

- Type: Private
- Industry: Retail
- Founded: 1919 (107 years ago)
- Founder: Isadore Michelson
- Headquarters: Lexington, Massachusetts, United States
- Number of locations: 2
- Key people: Eric Michelson (co-owner); Jerry Michelson (co-owner)
- Products: Shoes
- Website: michelsonshoes.com

Michelson's Shoes is an American independent shoe retailer with two stores in Massachusetts. It is the oldest family-owned store in Lexington, Massachusetts. The company was established in 1919 by Lithuanian immigrant Isadore "I. J." Michelson. Since then, it has passed through three generations of the family.

A second location was opened on Great Plain Avenue in Needham, Massachusetts, in 1985.

== History ==
Isadore Michelson (1880–1970) began Michelson's, with his cousin, B. Aronson, as a harness and shoe-repair business in August 1919, when Lexington, Massachusetts, was mostly farmland. He later bought out the premises, on Lexington's Massachusetts Avenue (Mass Ave), at its intersection with Muzzey Street, from Aronson. It originally occupied part of the business to its right (Wales Copy Shop, as of 2026); the door of that business was the original door to Michelson's. The repair side of the business was discontinued in 1962, at which point it focused on sales. The cobbler moved to new premises on Bedford Street in Lexington.

The company's first shoe order was placed to Lane Brothers of Boston in September 1919, totaling $18.65.

The business moved a few doors to the east in 1926, to today's 1810 Mass Ave, and again in 1941, occupying one-third of today's Theatre Pharmacy. The pharmacy building was, at one point, three storefronts, and today's Michelson's location, 1780 Mass Ave (to which it moved in June 1965), was once split in half.

Isadore passed the business to his son, Harold, in the mid-1940s. Isadore's grandson, Dick, took over in 1975. In the 1990s, it passed to Isadore's great-grandsons, Eric and Jerry, the fourth generation of the family.

Dick Michelson died in 2017, aged 84.

The company celebrated its centenary in 2019. The Needham Select Board awarded it a certificate of appreciation, recognizing the impact the business has had on the town.

In 2020, Boston Magazine named Michelson's the winner of its Best Kids' Shoes category.
