= The Waldorf School =

Coordinates: 42°25′47.1″N 71°12′22.4″W

Waldorf School of Lexington

Location
- 739 Massachusetts Ave; Lexington, Massachusetts 02420; United States

Information
- Type: Private, Independent, Waldorf
- Founded: 1971
- Head of school: Pauline Kelly
- Grades: Pre-K–8
- Enrollment: 203
- Accreditation: New England Association of Schools and Colleges (NEASC), Association of Waldorf Schools of North America (AWSNA)
- Annual tuition: $30,923 (grades 5-8)
- Website: thewaldorfschool.org

The Waldorf School of Lexington (WSL), established 1971, is located in Lexington, Massachusetts, and serves students from preschool through grade 8. The school offers a challenging academic program, provided by faculty educated in the understanding of students’ cognitive, emotional, and physical developmental stages. The school is adjacent to the 185-acre Great Meadows conservation land.

== History ==
The Waldorf School opened in 1971 as a kindergarten and day care center with several children in a Cambridge church basement. In its third year, the school's three faculty members decided to apply for membership in the Association of Waldorf Schools of North America (AWSNA). For six years the school was sponsored by the Waldorf School of Garden City, NY. By the end of the decade, the school had expanded to sixth grade and had become a full member of AWSNA. In 1982, the first eighth grade graduated.

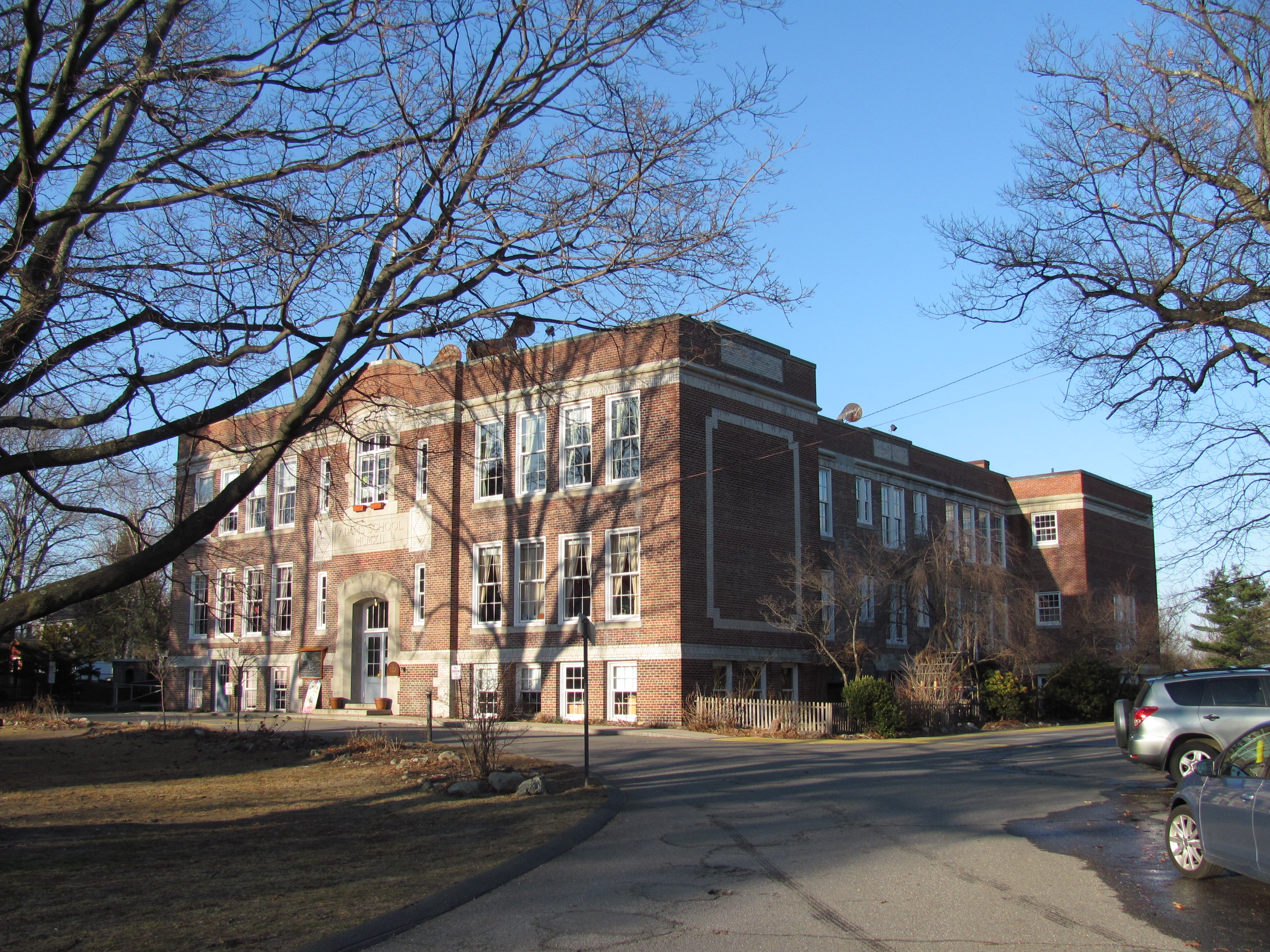
The Adams School building

== Accreditation ==
In 2002, the school was evaluated by a team from Association of Waldorf Schools of North America (AWSNA) and New England Association of Schools and Colleges (NEASC) . The school received accreditation from both organizations. The school is also a member of the Association of Independent Schools of New England (AISNE) and the National Association of Independent Schools (NAIS).
