= Mehran Khaghani =

American comedian

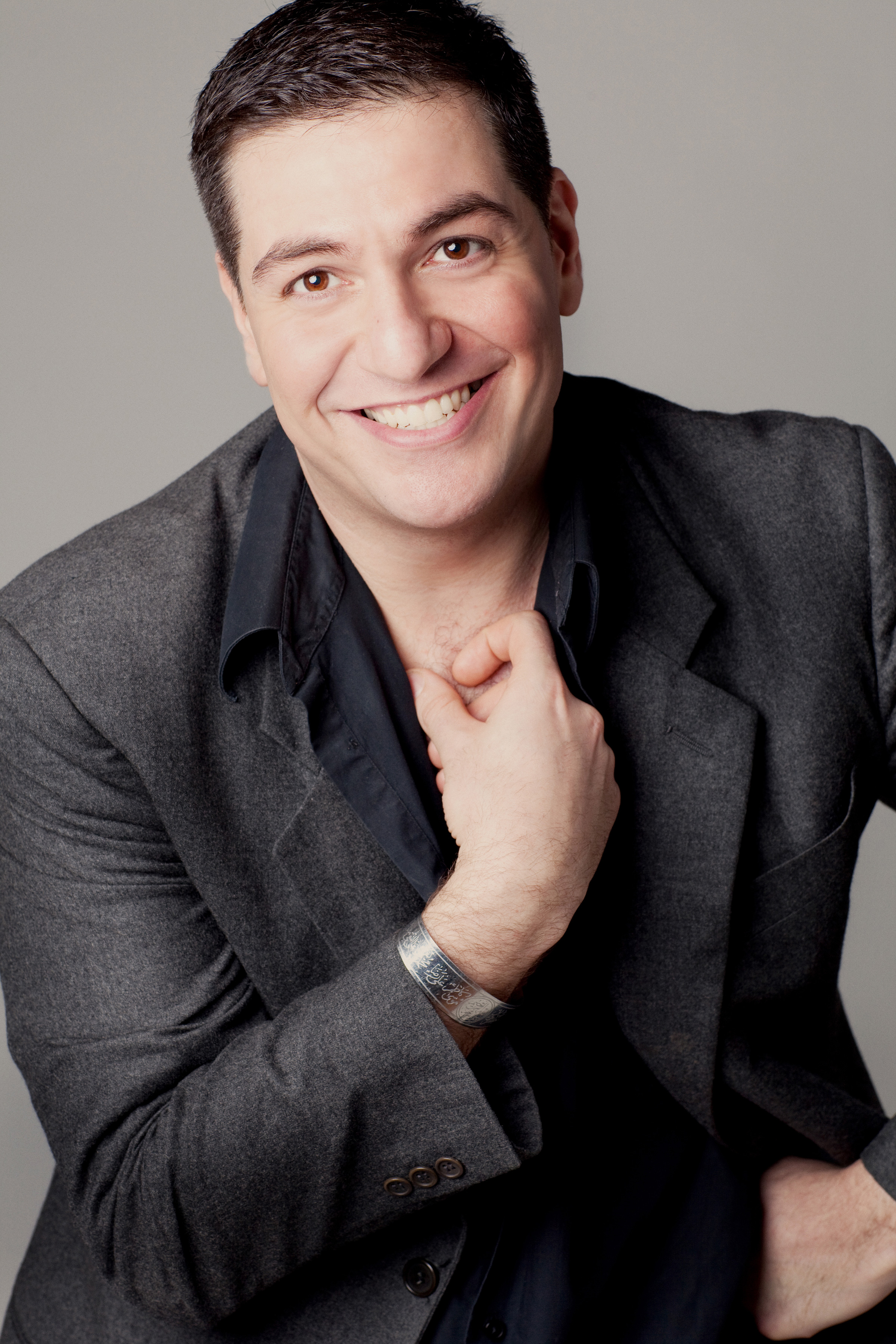
- Born: May 25, 1976 (age 50); London, UK
- Other names: Mehran, MehMeh
- Occupations: Stand-up comedian; director; producer
- Known for: Charming presentation of the obscene and absurd

Mehran Khaghani (Persian: مهران خاقانی; born May 25, 1976) is a British-American standup comedian, comedic director, and comedy event producer based in the Boston Metro area, of Iranian descent. In 2010, a reader survey in the Boston Phoenix named him Boston's best comedian of the year.

Born in London to Iranian parents, Mehran grew up in the United Kingdom, Iran, Turkey and the suburbs of Boston. In 1993, at the age of 17, he cofounded Lexington High School's first LGBT organization, called Bi-GLASS, with two fellow students, Fred Simon, now a New York-based visual artist, and musician Amanda Palmer, longtime frontwoman of The Dresden Dolls and now a solo artist.

After years in the hospitality industry and a four-year stint holding various administrative positions at Harvard University (including a year as Project Manager to the Office of the President and Provost under former President, Larry Summers) Mehran began pursuing a career in standup comedy in 2007. He has toured with Maz Jobrani's Brown and Friendly Tour and in his first year competing, ranked in the top 8 in the Boston International Comedy Festival.

As of 2010, Khaghani hosts a monthly standup comedy show at Mottley's Comedy Club in Faneuil Hall, Boston called "The Mehran Show," building each showcase around a different theme. He recently headlined and hosted a sold-out show in San Francisco called "No Gays In Iran" and was voted Boston's best comedian for 2010 by the readers of the Boston Phoenix. In August 2010, he produced the cabaret comedy show "Criscotheque" at the American Repertory Theater's Club Oberon.
