= Michael Arnowitt =

American pianist

- Born: Boston, Massachusetts
- Education: Yale University; Goddard College
- Occupations: classical, jazz pianist, political activist

Michael Arnowitt (born in Boston, Massachusetts) is an American classical and jazz pianist and political activist. He briefly attended Yale University before graduating from Goddard College. Arnowitt lived in Montpelier, Vermont for 32 years and, since 2017, divides his time between there and Toronto, Ontario. A documentary film about his life, Beyond 88 Keys: The Music of Michael Arnowitt (directed by Susan Bettmann), premiered at the 2004 Green Mountain Film Festival and was awarded the 2004 Goldstone Award by the Vermont Film Commission. Arnowitt is vision-impaired due to retinitis pigmentosa.
