= Lexington, Massachusetts =

Town in Middlesex County, Massachusetts, United States

- Town
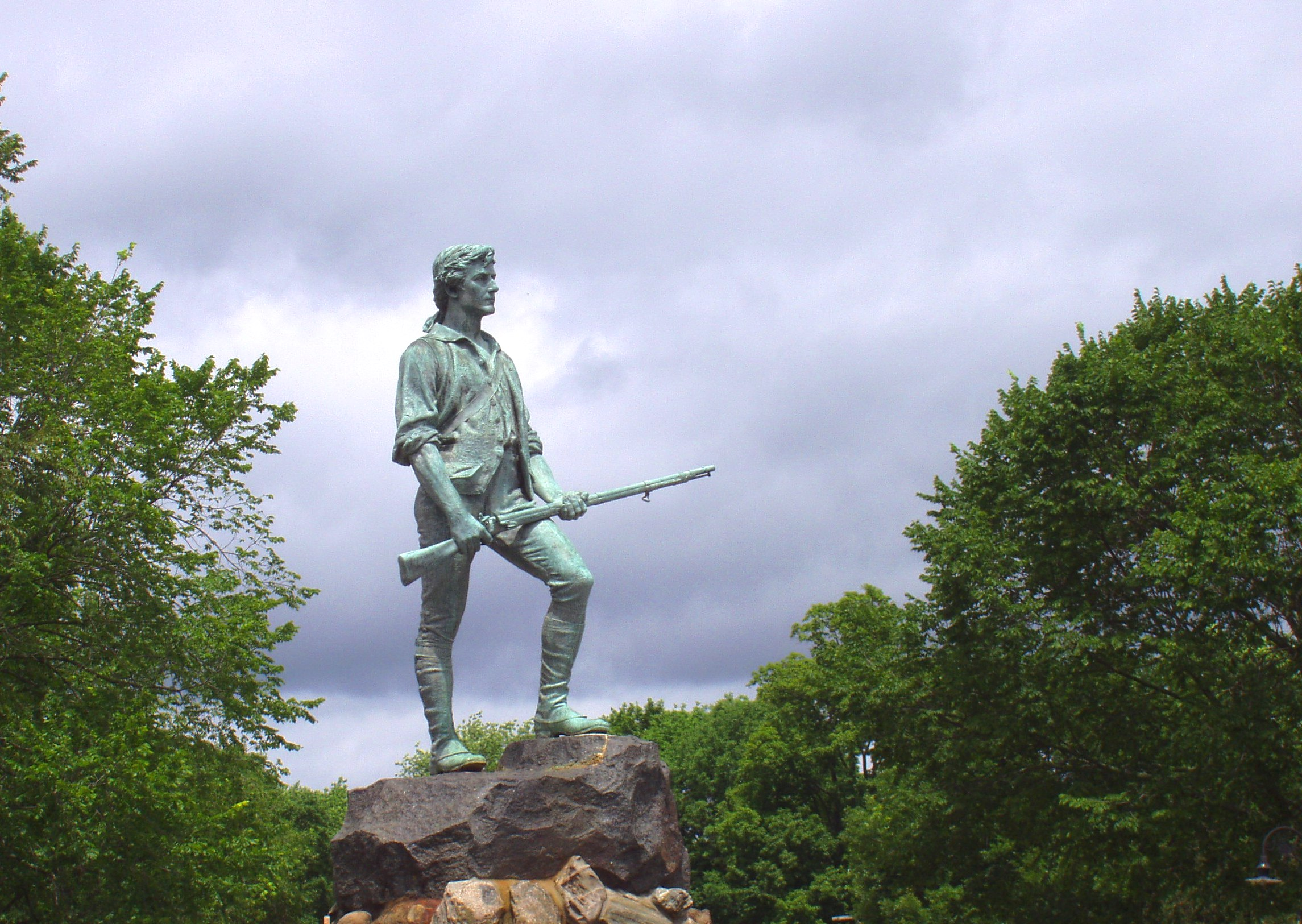
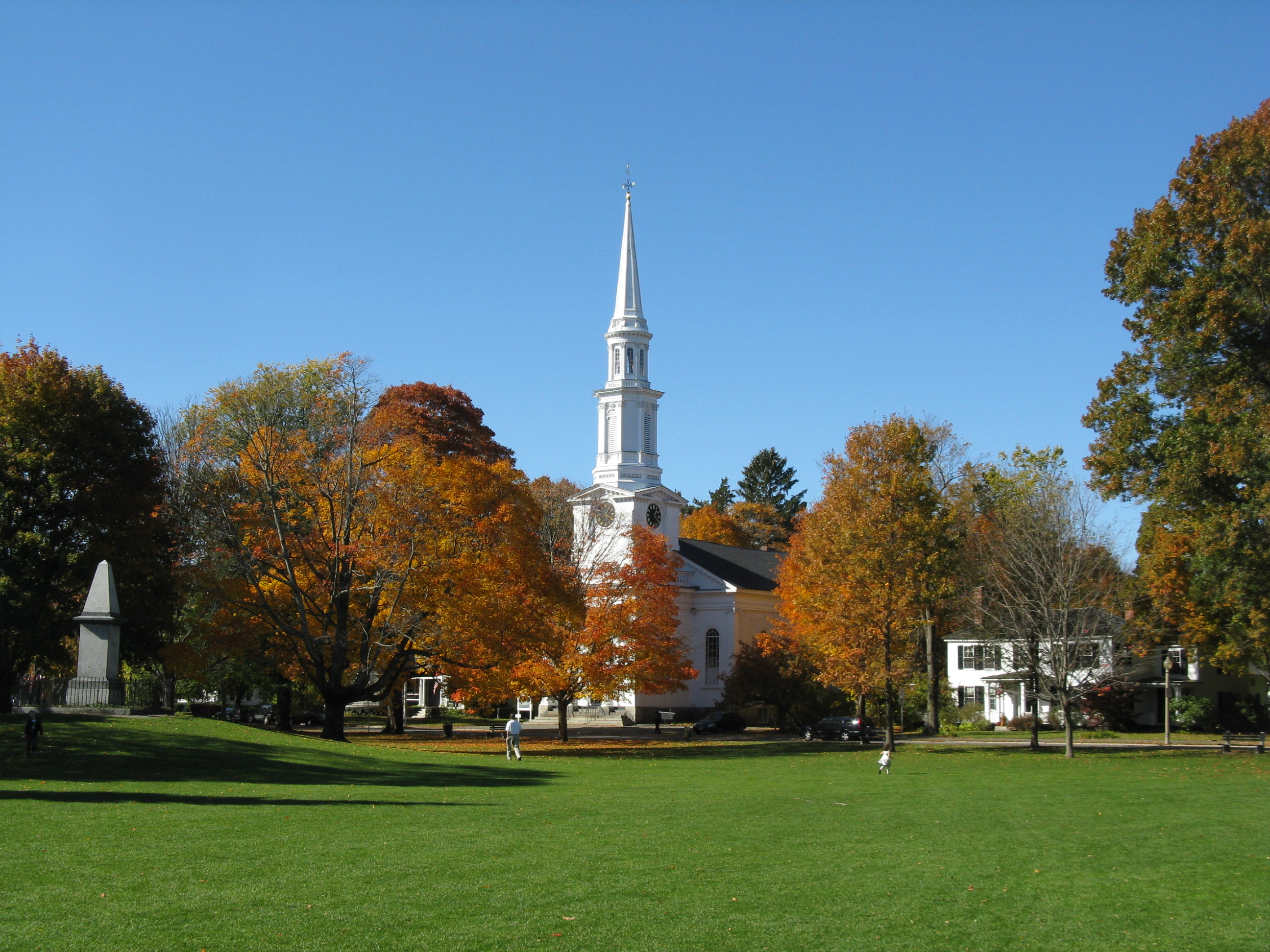
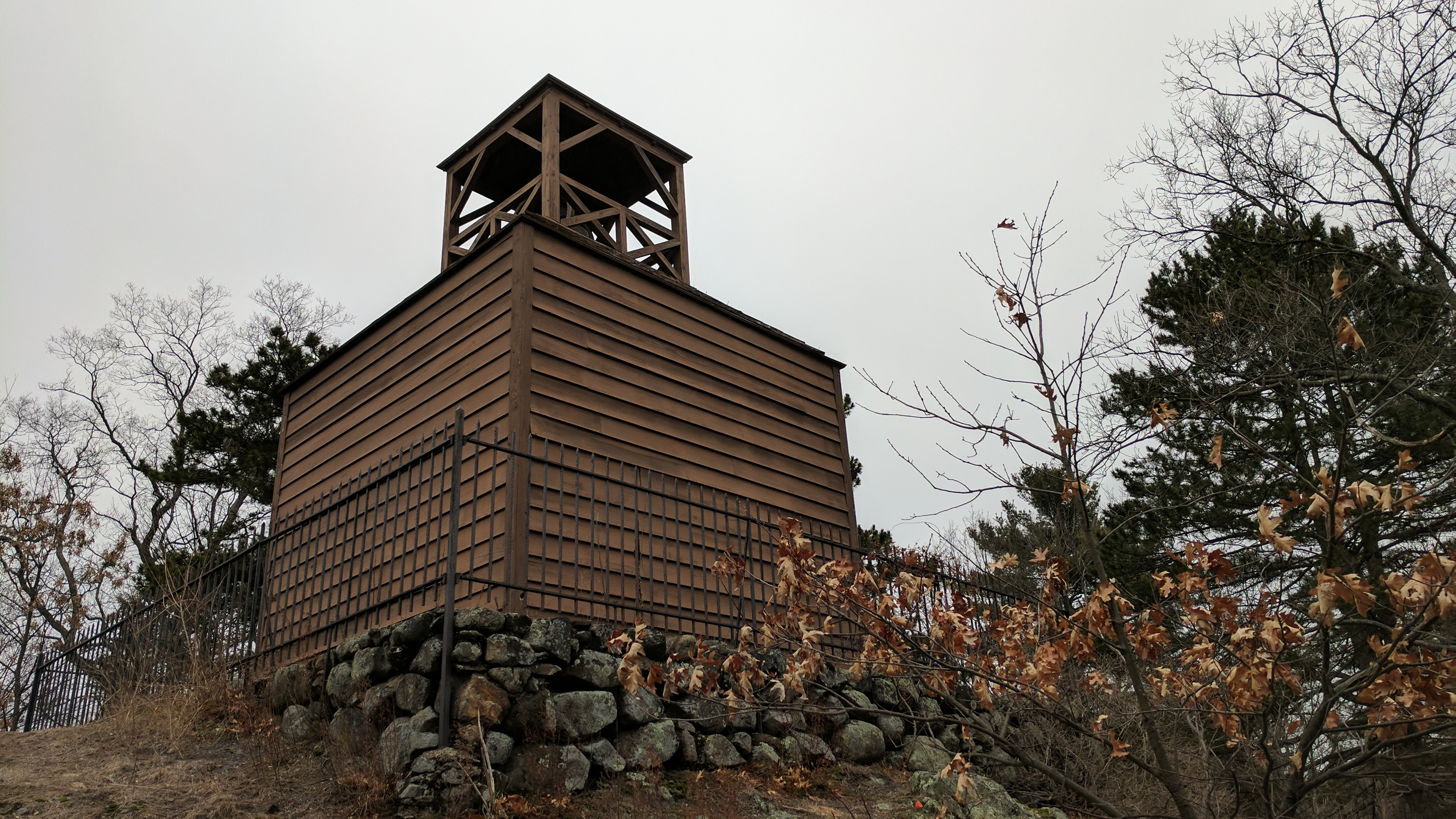
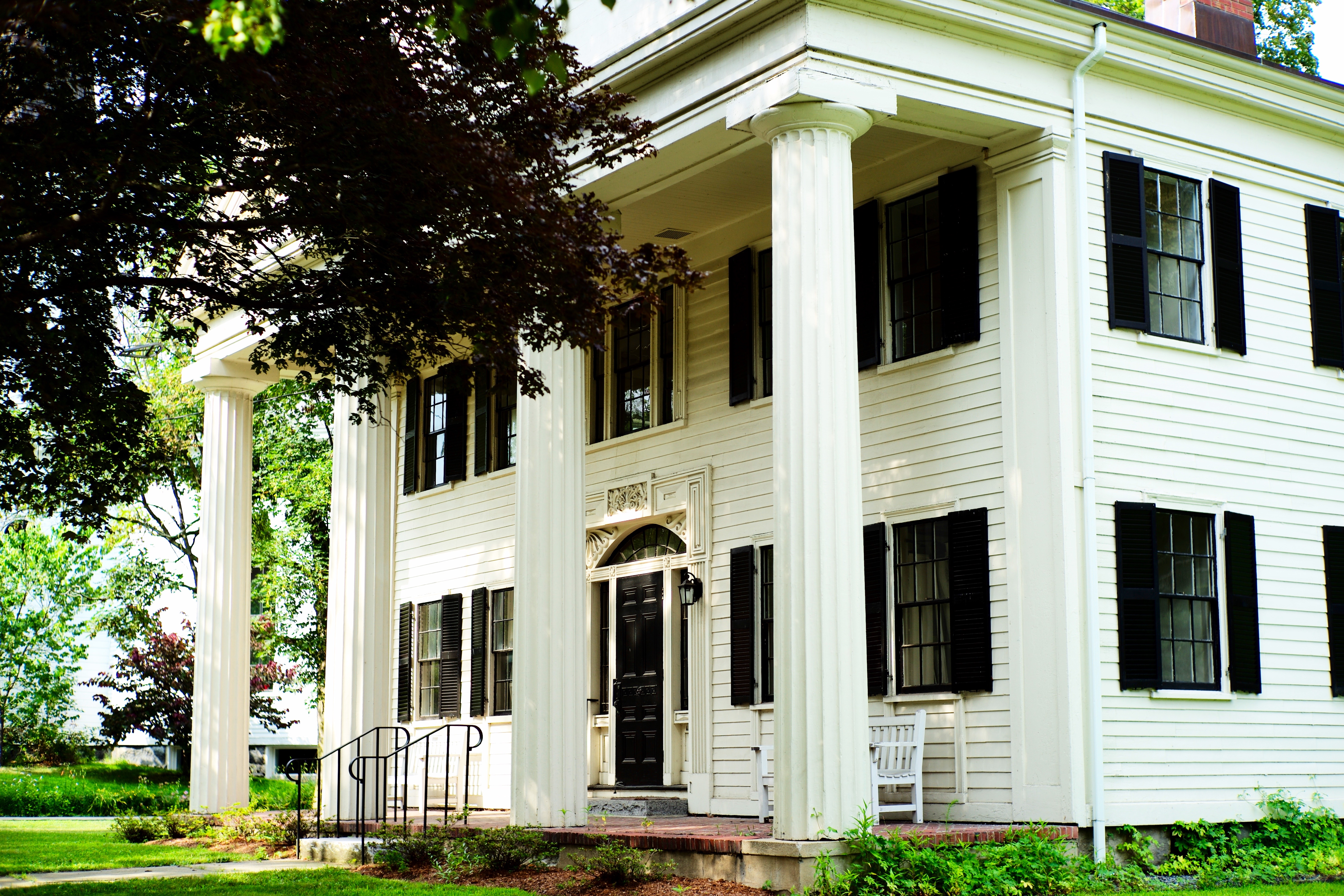
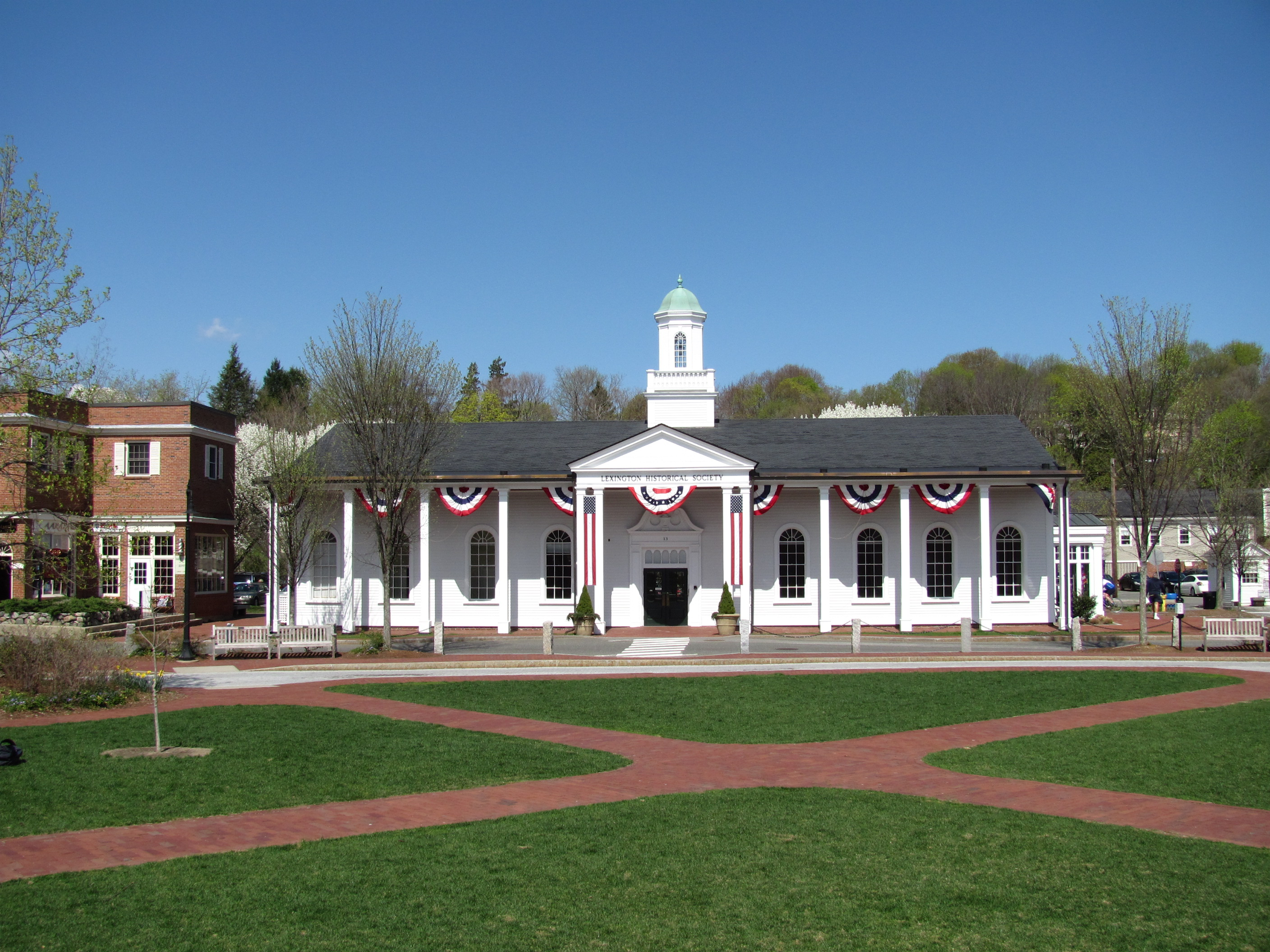
- Henry Hudson Kitson's The Lexington Minuteman statue Lexington Battle Green Old Belfry Stone Building in East Lexington The Lexington Depot

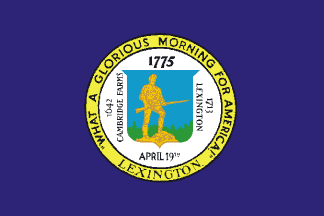
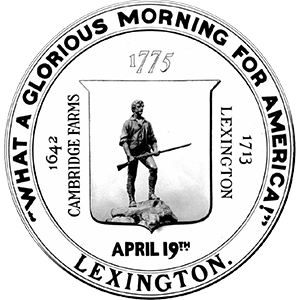
- Flag Seal
- Etymology: Likely from Laxton, Nottinghamshire
- Nickname: Birthplace of American Liberty
- Motto: "What a Glorious Morning for America!"
- Location in Middlesex County in Massachusetts

- Location within Greater Boston area Location within Massachusetts Location within the United States
- Coordinates: 42.4475°N 71.2275°W
- Country: United States
- State: Massachusetts
- County: Middlesex
- Region: New England
- Settled: 1642
- Incorporated: 1713

Government
  - Type: Representative town meeting
  - Town Manager: Steve Bartha

Area
  - Total: 16.5 sq mi (42.8 km^{2})
  - Land: 16.4 sq mi (42.5 km^{2})
  - Water: 0.15 sq mi (0.4 km^{2})
- Elevation: 210 ft (64 m)

Population (2020)
  - Total: 34,454
  - Density: 2,100/sq mi (811/km^{2})
- Demonym: Lexingtonian
- Time zone: UTC−5 (Eastern)
  - Summer (DST): UTC−4 (Eastern)
- ZIP Codes: 02420–02421 (Lexington); 01731 (Hanscom AFB)
- Area code: 339/781
- FIPS code: 25-35215
- GNIS feature ID: 0619401
- Website: www.lexingtonma.gov

Lexington is a suburban town in Middlesex County, Massachusetts, United States, located 10 miles (16 km) from Downtown Boston. The population was 34,454 as of the 2020 census. The area was originally inhabited by Native Americans, and was first settled by Europeans c. 1642 as a farming community. Lexington is well-known as the site of the first shots of the American Revolutionary War, in the Battle of Lexington on April 19, 1775, where the "Shot heard 'round the world" took place. It is home to Minute Man National Historical Park.

== History ==
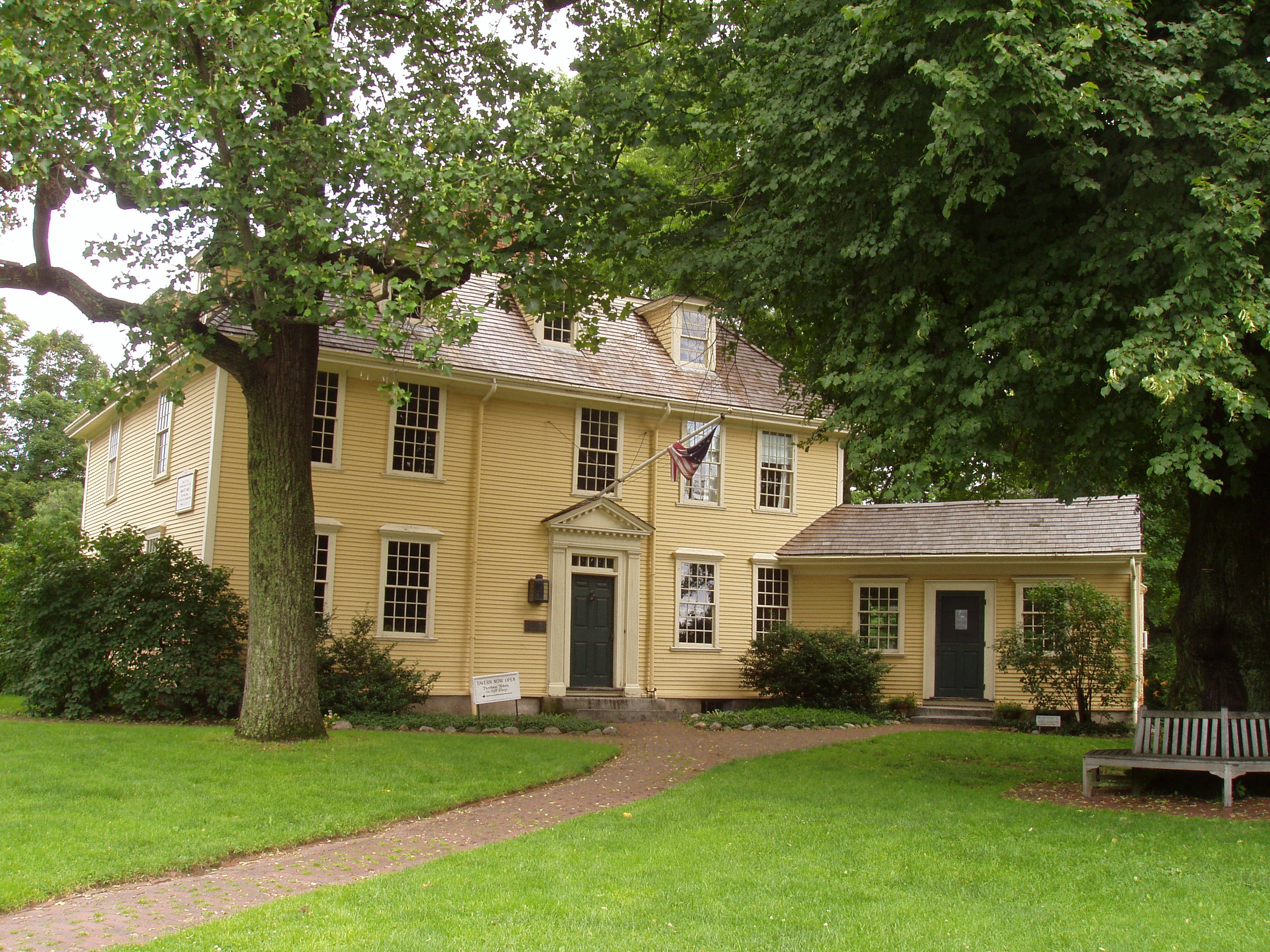
Buckman Tavern, built 1710

=== Indigenous history ===
Native Americans inhabited the area that would become Lexington for thousands of years prior to European colonization of the Americas, as attested by a woodland-era archaeological site near Loring Hill south of the town center. At the time of European contact, the area may have been a border region between Naumkeag or Pawtucket to the northeast, Massachusett to the south, and Nipmuc to the west, though the land was eventually purchased from the Naumkeag. The contact period introduced a number of European infectious diseases which would decimate native populations in virgin soil epidemics, leaving the area largely uncontested upon the arrival of large groups of English settlers in the Puritan Great Migration. In 1639, the Massachusetts General Court purchased the land that would become present-day Lexington, then within the boundaries of Cambridge, from the Naumkeag Squaw Sachem of Mistick.

=== Colonial history ===
The area that is now Lexington was first settled c. 1642 as part of Cambridge, Massachusetts. As the population increased, Lexington was incorporated as a separate parish, called Cambridge Farms, in 1691. This allowed the residents to have their own local church and minister, although they were still under jurisdiction of the Town of Cambridge. Lexington was incorporated as a separate town in 1713. It was then that it got the name Lexington. How the town received its name is the subject of some controversy. One view is that it was named in honor of Lord Lexington, an English peer. Another view is that it was named after Lexington (which was pronounced and is today spelled Laxton) in Nottinghamshire, England.

In the early colonial days, Vine Brook, which runs through Lexington, Burlington, and Bedford, and then empties into the Shawsheen River, was a focal point of the farming and industry of the town. It provided water for many types of mills, and in the 20th century, for farm irrigation.

=== Battle of Lexington ===
Battle of Lexington, April 1775

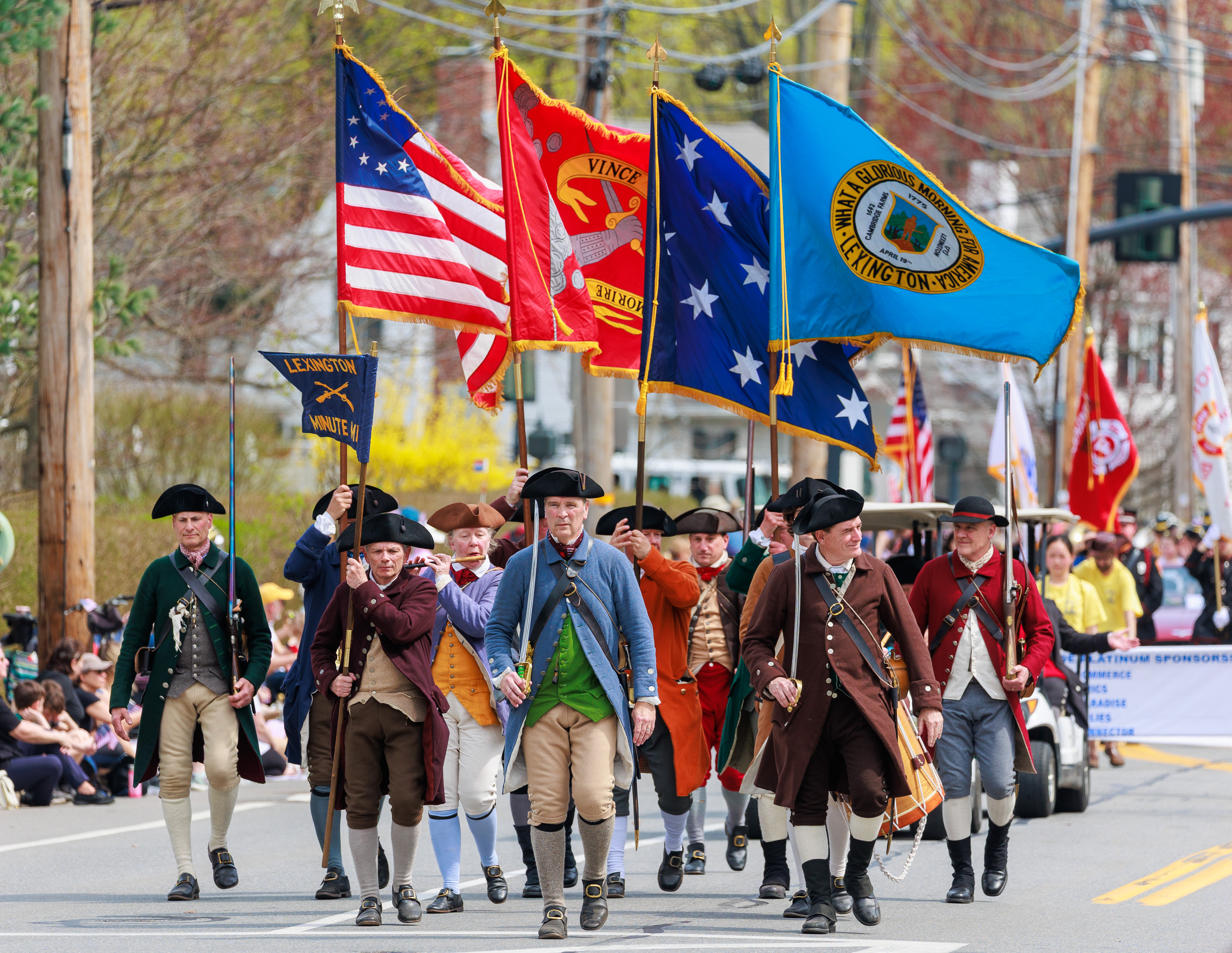
Patriots' Day parade, April 2025

On April 19, 1775, the first battle of the American Revolutionary War, the Battle at Lexington, took place. On the night of April 18, the British Army sent out 800 grenadiers and light infantry soldiers on foot from Boston, with the intention of destroying Colonial gunpowder and cannons that were being stored in Concord. John Hancock and Samuel Adams, who were staying in Lexington, were warned of the danger by two alarm riders, Paul Revere and William Dawes, who alerted the countryside of the British military movements. When the British arrived on the Lexington Common not long after sunrise, they faced approximately 77 men of the Lexington militia company, commanded by Captain John Parker. Someone—still unknown to this day—fired a shot, provoking an exchange of musket fire between the two sides. Eight Lexington militia men were killed, and ten were wounded. After the rout, the British marched on toward Concord. There, several hundred militia members and minute men from nearby towns assembled near the Old North Bridge to turn back the British and prevent them from capturing and destroying the Colony's stores of gunpowder and military equipment.

Today, the town annually commemorates the battle on the Battle Green with Patriots' Day festivities including reenactments, historic house tours, concerts, various ceremonies, and a parade.

=== Urbanization ===
For decades after the Revolutionary War, Lexington grew modestly while remaining largely a farming community, providing Boston with much of its produce. Many of these farms became dense housing developments and subdivisions by the 1970s. One notable housing development was the Peacock Farm residential neighborhood. It was designed by architect Walter Pierce and was built between 1952 and 1958. As of 2012, the neighborhood was on the National Register of Historic Places. Lexington always had a bustling downtown area, which remains to this day. Lexington began to prosper, helped by its proximity to Boston, and having a rail line (originally the Lexington and West Cambridge Railroad, later the Boston and Maine Railroad) service its citizens and businesses, beginning in 1846 until 1981. In 1984, due to the rapid urbanization that occurred in many other suburbs like Lexington, the MBTA proposed expanding the Red Line through Lexington, terminating in Bedford. Despite Lexington and Bedford being on board with the idea, Arlington residents lobbied against the plan and it was shot down by the Board of Selectmen.

Lexington, as well as many of the towns along the Route 128 corridor, experienced a jump in population in the 1960s and 1970s, due to the high-tech boom. In the 21st Century, major companies such as Novo, Takeda Pharmaceutical Company and BAE Systems have operations within the town limits. The urbanization and massive job growth resulted in soaring property values, and the school system becoming nationally recognized for its excellence. The town participates in the METCO program, which buses minority students from Boston to suburban towns to receive better educational opportunities than those available to them in the Boston Public Schools.

Lexington was the Cold War location of the USAF "Experimental SAGE Subsector" for testing a developmental prototype IBM computer, which that arrived in July 1955 for development of a computerized "national air defense network" (the namesake "Lexington Discrimination System" for incoming ICBM warheads was developed in the late 1960s).

== Geography ==
Lexington is located at 42°26′39″N 71°13′36″W (42.444345, −71.226928).

According to the United States Census Bureau, the town has a total area of 16.5 square miles (42.8 km^{2}), of which 16.4 square miles (42.5 km^{2}) is land and 0.1 square miles (0.4 km^{2}), or 0.85%, is water.

Lexington is bordered by Burlington, Woburn, Winchester, Arlington, Belmont, Waltham, Lincoln, and Bedford. It has more area than all other municipalities that it borders.

== Demographics ==
Historical population
Year	Pop.	±%
1790	941	—
1850	1,893	+101.2%
1860	2,329	+23.0%
1870	2,277	−2.2%
1880	2,460	+8.0%
1890	3,197	+30.0%
1900	3,831	+19.8%
1910	4,918	+28.4%
1920	6,350	+29.1%
1930	9,467	+49.1%
1940	13,187	+39.3%
1950	17,335	+31.5%
1960	27,691	+59.7%
1970	31,886	+15.1%
1980	29,479	−7.5%
1990	28,974	−1.7%
2000	30,355	+4.8%
2010	31,394	+3.4%
2020	34,454	+9.7%
2024*	34,743	+0.8%
* = population estimate. Source: United States census records and Population Estimates Program data.

Lexington CDP, Massachusetts – Racial composition
Race (NH = Non-Hispanic)	2020	2010	2000	1990	1980
White alone (NH)	56.7% (19,519)	73.7% (23,138)	85.1% (25,822)	91.1% (26,406)	95.3% (28,102)
Black alone (NH)	1.3% (459)	1.5% (457)	1.1% (337)	1.1% (309)	1% (290)
American Indian alone (NH)	0.1% (21)	0.1% (21)	0.1% (20)	0.1% (15)	0% (0)
Asian alone (NH)	33.1% (11,404)	19.9% (6,239)	10.9% (3,306)	6.5% (1,870)	2.6% (764)
Pacific Islander alone (NH)	0% (0)	0% (3)	0% (1)		
Other race alone (NH)	0.7% (236)	0.2% (77)	0.2% (61)	0.1% (20)	0.1% (35)
Multiracial (NH)	4.7% (1,635)	2.4% (746)	1.3% (380)	—	—
Hispanic/Latino (any race)	3.4% (1,180)	2.3% (713)	1.4% (428)	1.2% (354)	1% (288)

The most reported ancestries in 2020 were:

- Chinese (14.8%)
- Irish (14.3%)
- English (12.7%)
- Indian (11.4%)
- German (9.2%)
- Italian (8%)
- Scottish (3.7%)
- French (3.6%)
- Korean (3.2%)
- Polish (3.1%)

As of the census of 2010, there had been 31,394 people, 11,530 households, and 8,807 families residing in the town. The population density was 1,851.0 inhabitants per square mile (714.7/km^{2}). There were 12,019 housing units at an average density of 691.1 per square mile (266.8/km^{2}). The racial makeup of the town was 68.6% White, 25.4% Asian (15.4% Chinese, 4.8% Asian Indian, 3.2% Korean), 1.5% Black or African American, 0.1% Native American, 0.0% Pacific Islander, 0.5% from other races, and 2.6% from two or more races. Hispanic or Latino of any race were 2.3% of the population.

There were 11,530 households, out of which 38.6% had children under the age of 18 living with them, 66.0% were married couples living together, 7.7% had a female householder with no husband present, and 24.1% were non-families. Of all households, 20.8% were made up of individuals, and 12.3% had someone living alone who was 65 years of age or older. The average household size was 2.66 and the average family size was 3.10.

In the town, the population was spread out, with 26.4% under the age of 18, 3.5% from 18 to 24, 22.7% from 25 to 44, 28.5% from 45 to 64, and 19.0% who were 65 years of age or older. The median age was 44 years. For every 100 females, there were 88.7 males. For every 100 females age 18 and over, there were 83.5 males.

In 2018, the mean home price was $910,584, and the median price of a house was $1,050,821. According to a 2018 estimate, the median income for a household in the town was $191,350, and the median income for a family was $218,890. Males had a median income of $101,334 versus $77,923 for females. The per capita income for the town was $70,132. About 1.8% of families and 3.4% of the population were below the poverty line, including 3.2% of those under age 18 and 3.4% of those age 65 or over.

By race, the median household income was highest for mixed race households, at $263,321. Hispanic households had a median income of $233,875. Asian households had a median income of $178,988. White households had a median income of $154,533. Black households had a median income of $139,398. American Indian or Alaskan Native households had a median income of $125,139.

=== Immigrant population ===
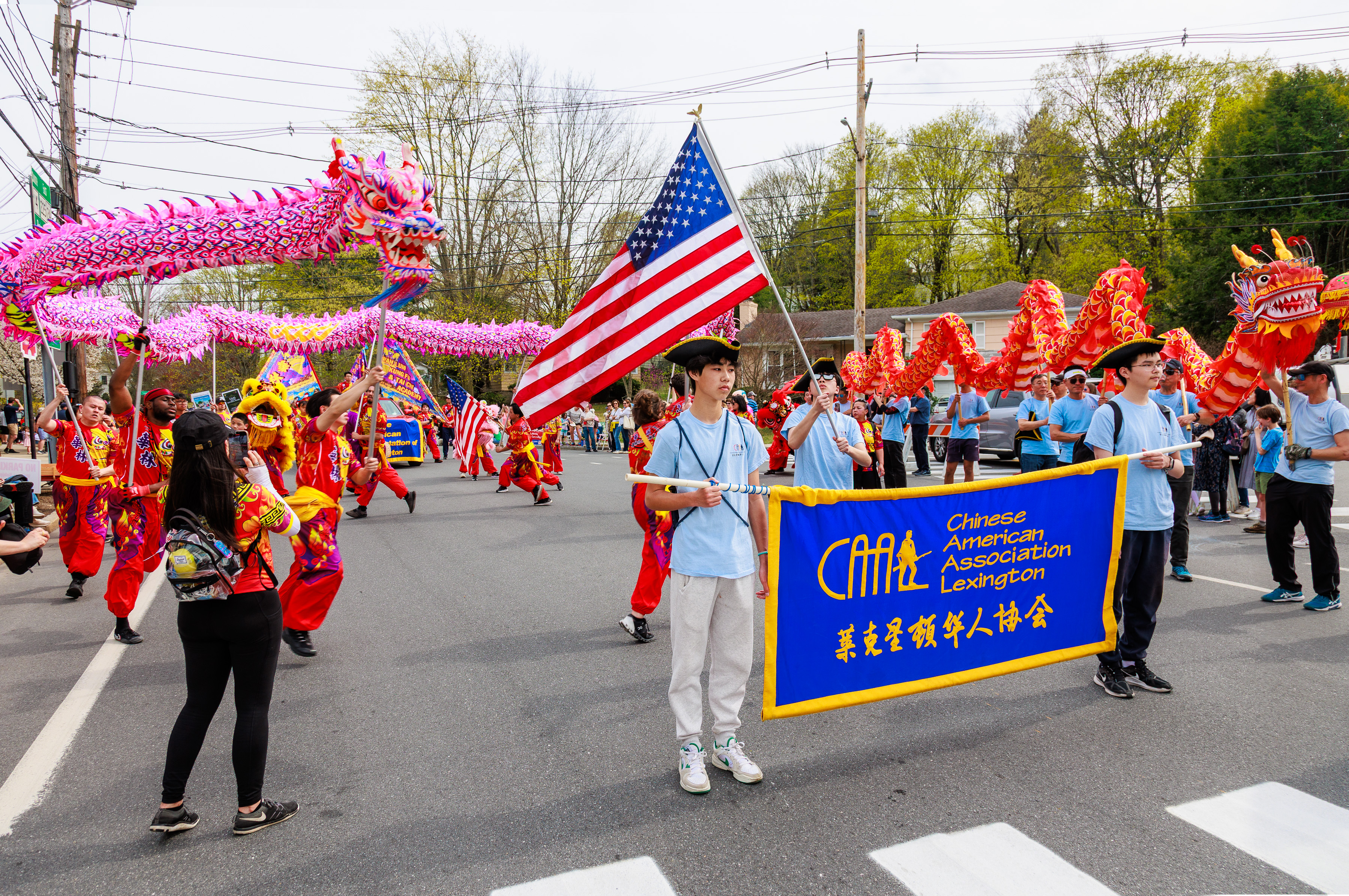
Chinese American Association of Lexington

As of 2022, Lexington had the highest Asian population in Massachusetts, reflecting 32% of the population. Thirty-three percent of Lexington residents were born outside of the United States. This racial diversity is largely reflected in the Lexington Public Schools, where Asians compose over 45% of the student population.

== Transportation ==
MBTA bus operates three routes that connect with the Red Line at Alewife station in Cambridge. The Town of Lexington operates three weekday bus routes via its own Lexpress service, with their inbound terminus being Depot Square.

== Government and politics ==
The town uses a five-member Select Board. The day-to-day operations are handled by a Town Manager hired by the Select Board. A Representative town meeting, acts as the legislative body, made up of 203 members, including 21 citizens elected from each of nine precincts for three-year staggered terms, and it meets at least once a year. At-large member positions include the Select Board, Town Counsel, Town Clerk and the School Committee chairman. Article LXXXIX Section 8 of the Massachusetts Constitution permits towns with a population greater than 12,000 to adopt a city form of government. The Town of Lexington meets the population requirement to become a city, but has not done so, in part because it would lose its ability to engage citizens in local government under the Representative Town Meeting form of government.

Lexington is Represented by State Representative Michelle Ciccolo, State Senators Cindy Friedman and Michael Barrett, all Democrats. Lexington is in Massachusetts's 5th congressional district, currently represented by Katherine Clark. Federally, Lexington is heavily Democratic, having not voted Republican since 1980. Even in Scott Brown's upset 2010 Senate special election, he received just 34% of the vote, to Coakley's 64%.

Presidential election results

Lexington town vote by party in presidential elections
Year	Democratic	Republican	Third party
2024	77.2% 14,362	17.6% 3,279	5.2% 962
2020	81.3% 16,308	16.6% 3,337	2.0% 403
2016	77.1% 13,900	18.2% 3,279	4.7% 854
2012	70.2% 12,750	29.1% 5,293	0.7% 185
2008	72.2% 12,984	26.1% 4,593	1.7% 199
2004	70.6% 12,334	27.5% 4,834	1.9% 207
2000	63.1% 10,623	26.9% 4,741	10.1% 1,349
1996	63.6% 10,659	27.4% 4,824	9.0% 1,002
1992	55.4% 10,015	26.7% 5,001	17.9% 2,000
1988	57.0% 10,252	40.3% 7,252	2.7% 245
1984	53.1% 9,397	45.8% 8,118	1.1% 184
1980	37.3% 6,557	39.8% 6,999	22% 3,745
1976	49.6% 8,494	45.6% 7,814	4.8% 544
1972	52.1% 8,478	45.7% 7,432	2.2% 366
1968	55.4% 7,941	42.4% 6,075	2.2% 309
1964	67.7% 8,760	31.6% 4,085	0.7% 96
1960	41.6% 5,371	57.9% 7,484	0.5% 59
1956	23.4% 2,607	76.4% 8,512	0.2% 22
1952	22.7% 2,108	77.1% 7,155	0.2% 16
1948	27.6% 1,795	70.7% 4,603	1.7% 111
1944	28.7% 1,778	71.2% 4,410	0.1% 9
1940	29.0% 1,689	70.8% 4,129	0.2% 16
1936	28.8% 1,498	67.0% 3,489	4.2% 217
1932	30.0% 1,368	67.7% 3,091	2.3% 107
1928	31.1% 1,180	68.7% 2,609	0.2% 9
1924	17.0% 432	76.8% 1,949	6.1% 156
1920	18.4% 403	80.5% 1,768	1.1% 25
1916	34.0% 351	65.1% 672	0.9% 9
1912	28.1% 264	33.8% 318	38.1% 358 (Note: 348 out of 358 Third Party votes were cast for the Progressive Party ticket of Theodore Roosevelt and Hiram Johnson.)
1908	19.9% 161	77.3% 626	2.8% 23
1904	25.5% 180	72.9% 514	1.6% 11
1900	24.9% 155	70.9% 441	4.2% 26
1896	13.9% 82	80.3% 473	5.8% 34
1892	40.4% 252	58.5% 365	1.1% 7
1888	38.3% 220	61.7% 355	0.0% 0
1884	39.8% 185	56.8% 264	3.4% 16
1880	35.8% 155	64.2% 278	0.0% 0
1876	38.4% 177	61.6% 284	0.0% 0
1872	26.4% 79	73.6% 220	0.0% 0
1868	40.9% 124	59.1% 179	0.0% 0

== Emergency services ==
=== Law enforcement ===
The Lexington Police Department (LPD) is responsible for law enforcement in the town of Lexington, handling investigations, patrol, and traffic safety/control, with 51 sworn officers. They also host a youth academy for children aged 12–17 as well as a Police Explorers Program (For high school students interested in the comprehensive learning of Law Enforcement). It is led by Chief of Police Michael McLean.

=== Fire and rescue ===
The Lexington Fire Department (LFD) provides both fire and rescue, and emergency medical services to the town of Lexington. The date of its formation is unknown. It is based in the Fire Department Headquarters, with a secondary East Lexington Station, having 61 firefighters and EMS personnel. It is led by Fire Chief Derek Sencabaugh.

== Education ==
=== Public schools ===
Lexington's public education system includes six elementary schools, two middle schools, and one high school. Students may attend Minuteman Regional High School as an alternative to the local Lexington High School. In 2012, 2017, 2018, 2023, and 2024, Lexington High School won the U.S. Department of Energy (DOE) National Science Bowl competition. In 2019 and 2021, Jonas Clarke Middle School won the National Middle School Science Bowl competition.

Elementary Schools

- Joseph Estabrook Elementary School
- Fiske Elementary School
- Maria Hastings Elementary School
- Bridge Elementary School
- Bowman Elementary School
- Harrington Elementary School

Middle Schools

- William Diamond Middle School
- Jonas Clarke Middle School

High Schools

- Lexington High School
- Minuteman Regional High School

=== Private schools ===
- Lexington Christian Academy
- Lexington Montessori School
- The Waldorf School of Lexington

=== Supplementary education ===
- The Lexington Chinese School (LCS; 勒星頓中文學校) holds its classes at Belmont High School in Belmont. In 2003 over 400 students attended classes at LCS, held on Sundays.
- Shishu Bharati School of Languages and Culture of India
- AoPS Academy hosts a branch school in Lexington, teaching mathematics and language arts.

== Culture and art ==
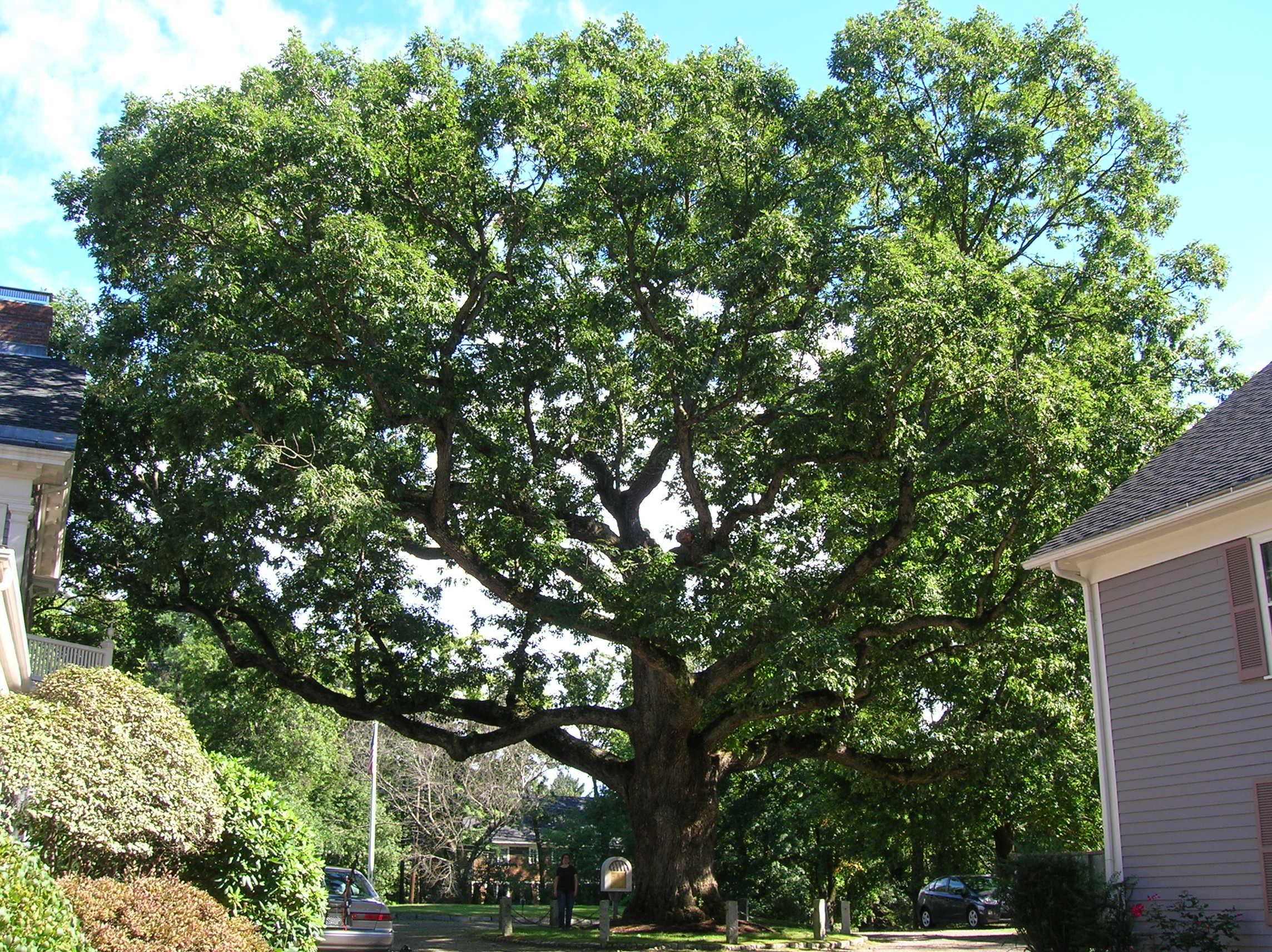
Historic Mullikan Oak Tree, September 2012

Old Belfry in Belfry Hill Park, Clarke Street

=== Music ===
Lexington is home to the Lexington Symphony, which performs regularly at Cary Hall.

== Economy ==
Major employers in Lexington include Takeda (formerly Shire), BAE Systems, MIT Lincoln Laboratory, Novo, Agilent, Global Insight, CareOne, the Cotting School, Ipswitch, and Lexington Public Schools.

Michelson's Shoes, on Massachusetts Avenue, is the oldest family-owned store in the town. It was established in 1919.

== Points of interest ==
- Lexington is most well known for its history and is home to many historic buildings, parks, and monuments, most dating from Colonial and Revolutionary times.
- One of the most prominent historical landmarks, located in Lexington Centre, is the Lexington Common, commonly known as the Lexington Battle Green, and known by locals as the Battle Green or the Green. The Lexington Battle Green is known for being the site of the Battle of Lexington, where the first shots of the Revolutionary War were fired. A statue of the captain of the Lexington Militia, John Parker, stands on the Battle Green. The statue is known as the Minuteman Statue by locals. A historical reenactment of the Battle of Lexington takes place on the Battle Green every year on Patriots' Day as part of the Patriots' Day celebrations.
- Another important historical monument is the Revolutionary Monument, the nation's oldest standing war memorial (completed on July 4, 1799) and the gravesite of those colonists slain in the Battle of Lexington.
- Other landmarks of historical importance include the Old Burying Ground (with gravestones dating back to 1690), the Old Belfry, Buckman Tavern (c. 1704–1710), Munroe Tavern (c. 1695), the Hancock–Clarke House (1737), the U.S.S. Lexington Memorial, the Centre Depot (old Boston and Maine train station, today the headquarters of Lexington History Museums), Follen Church (the oldest standing church building in Lexington, built in 1839), and the Mulliken White Oak (one of Lexington's most distinguished and oldest trees).
- Efforts to preserve the Jonathan Harrington house ultimately led to the founding of the Society for the Preservation of New England Antiquities, now Historic New England.
- The Lexington Women's Liberty Monument, unveiled in May 2024, commemorates the historical and cultural contributions of women from the eighteenth century to the twenty-first century. It is located in Lexington's historic district across from the Lexington Battle Green
- Lexington is also home, along with neighboring Lincoln and nearby Concord to the 900-acre (3.6 km^{2}) Minute Man National Historical Park.
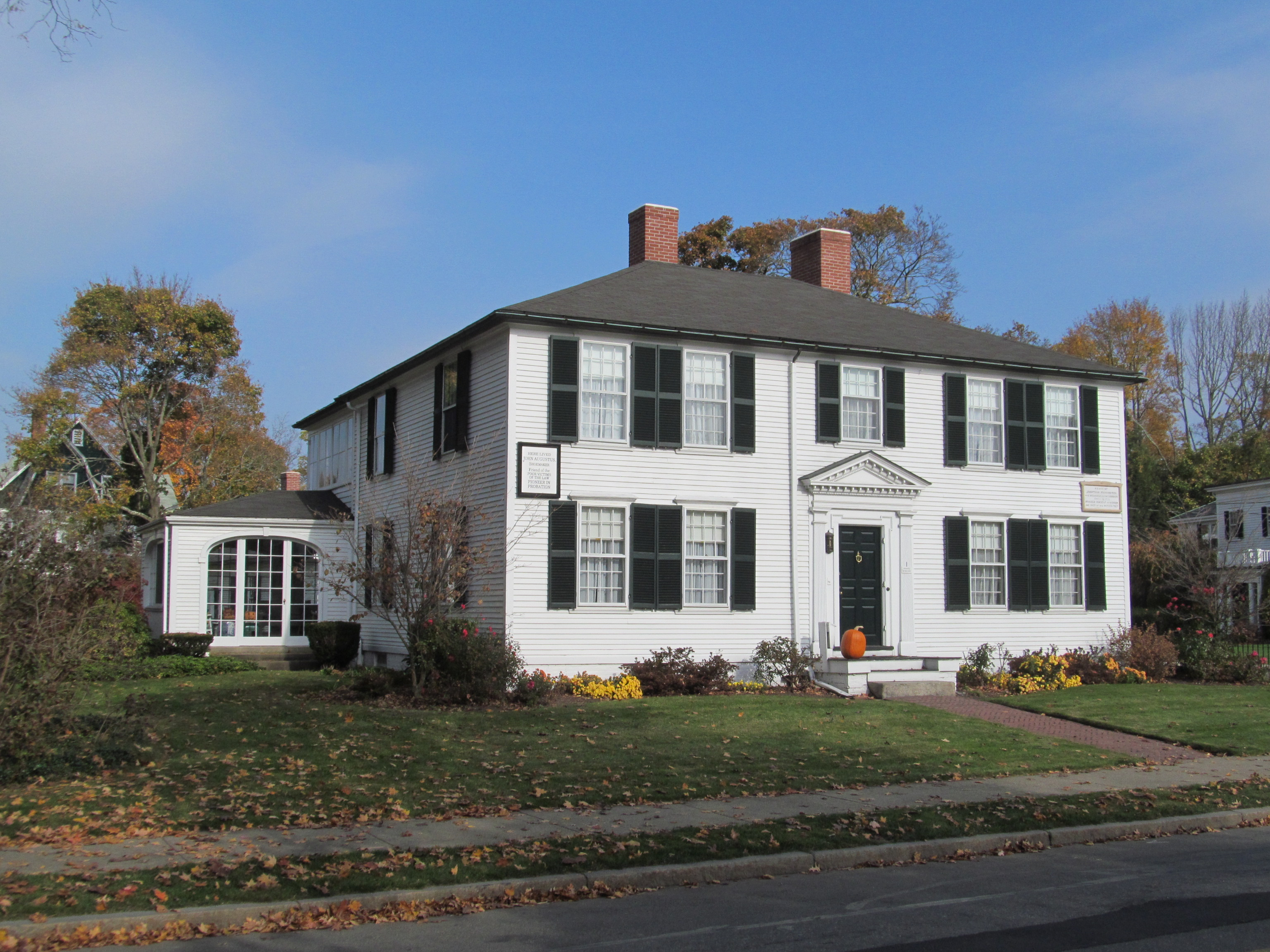
  House of Jonathan Harrington
- The Scottish Rite Masonic Museum & Library features exhibitions on American history, Freemasonry, and fraternal organizations.
- Lexington's town center is home to numerous dining opportunities, fine art galleries, retail shopping, a small cinema, the Cary Memorial Library, the Minuteman Bikeway, Depot Square, and many of the aforementioned historical landmarks.
- The Great Meadow, a.k.a. Arlington's Great Meadows, is a sprawling meadow and marshland located in East Lexington, but owned by the town of Arlington, Lexington's neighbor to the east.
- Willards Woods Conservation Area, a small forest of conservation land donated years ago by the Willard Sisters. Willards Woods is referenced in the classic Saturday Night Live skit "Donnie's Party".
- Wilson Farm, a farm and farm stand in operation since 1884.
- The Lexington Community Center is a meeting place for Lexington residents.
- Notable Lexington neighborhoods include Lexington Centre, Meriam Hill (and Granny Hill), Irish Village, Loring Hill, Belfry Hill, Munroe Hill, Countryside (sometimes referred to as "Scotland"), the Munroe District, the Manor Section, Four Corners, Grapevine Corner, Woodhaven, Liberty Heights and East Lexington (fondly "East Village", or "The East End").
- Marrett Square, at the intersection of Marrett Road and Waltham Street, is the location of some light shopping and dining.
- The "Old Reservoir," sometimes referred to by locals as "The Res," used to provide drinking water to Lexington residents and surrounding areas. Now it offers a place to swim and picnic in the summer time. In the winter, when it freezes over, it is used as an ice skating area.
- Book publisher D.C. Heath was founded in 1885 at 125 Spring Street in Lexington, near the present-day intersection of Route 128 and MA Route 2, and was headquartered on that spot until its 1995 sale to Houghton Mifflin.
- Lexington is home to several historically significant modernist communities built by notable architects. These neighborhoods include Six Moon Hill, Peacock Farm, Five Fields, and Turning Mill/Middle Ridge.

== Sister cities ==
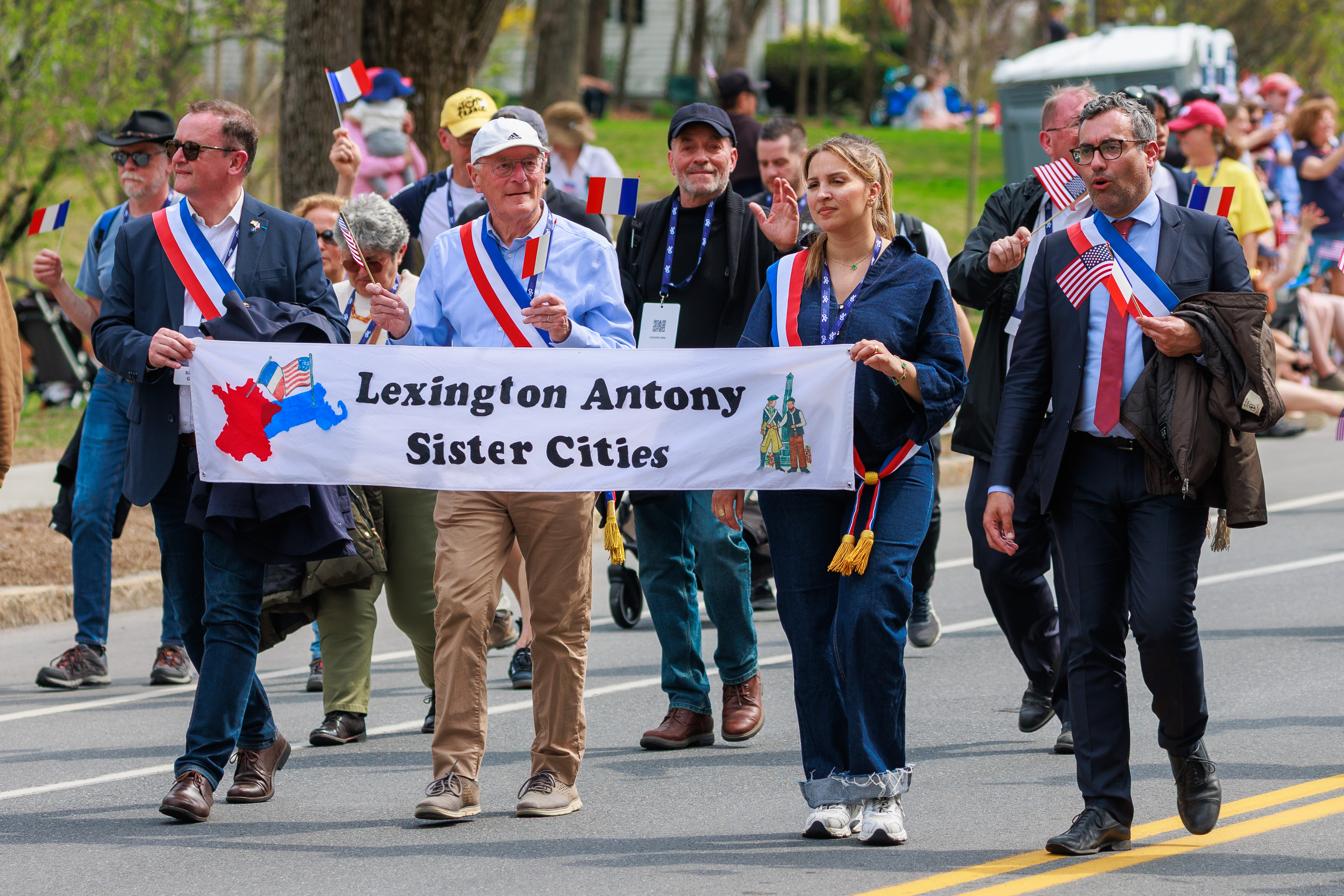
Mayor and dignitaries from Antony in Lexington's Patriots' Day parade

Lexington is a sister city of:

- Antony, France
- Dolores Hidalgo, Guanajuato, Mexico
- Waspam, Nicaragua
