= Lexington Public Schools (Massachusetts) =

School district in Massachusetts, United States

Coordinates: 42°26′39.72″N 71°11′58.30″W

Lexington Public Schools is a public school district in Lexington, Massachusetts, United States. The district comprises six elementary schools, two middle schools, and a high school. Each elementary and middle school is named after an important figure in Lexington's history.

== District schools ==
==== Bowman Elementary School ====
Bowman Elementary is named for the descendants of Nathaniel Bowman, an early settler in Lexington. Opened in 1967, the original building was designed by the architectural firm Clinch, Crimp, Brown, and Fisher.

Rather than using a multi-story layout, the architects designed a single-story campus adapted to the natural grade of the site, featuring low-pitched roofs, wide eaves, and large exterior window spans. In 2011–2012, the town completed a major renovation to upgrade the building envelope, mechanical systems, and classroom infrastructure while retaining its original single-story footprint.

==== Bridge Elementary School ====
Bridge Elementary is named for the descendants of Matthew Bridge, who formerly owned the farmland surrounding the school site. Designed by Clinch, Crimp, Brown, and Fisher, the school opened in 1966 during Lexington's post-war residential expansion.

The single-story building was laid out with low-profile classroom wings, broad window walls, and deep exterior eaves intended to maximize natural daylight and provide direct ground-level access to outdoor areas. A prominent facade mural depicting community collaboration marks the main entrance. Bridge was named a National Blue Ribbon School in 2010 and underwent building envelope and HVAC upgrades in 2012.

==== Joseph Estabrook Elementary School ====
Joseph Estabrook Elementary is named after Joseph Estabrook (1669–1733), Lexington's first schoolteacher. Opened in 1961, the original facility was designed by Clinch, Crimp, Brown, and Fisher to support Superintendent Medill Bair's "team teaching" instructional model.

Unlike traditional single-corridor schools, the 1961 building was organized around multi-grade instructional wings with retractable acoustic partition walls, project centers, and large-group assembly rooms that allowed classes to combine or separate as needed. The exterior featured low horizontal rooflines, deep window bands, and a decorative mosaic mural near the main entrance. In 2005, the school was the subject of the Parker v. Hurley curriculum lawsuit. The original 1961 structure was demolished and replaced on the same site by a new net-zero energy facility that opened for the 2014–2015 school year.

==== Fiske Elementary School ====
Fiske Elementary is named for the Fiske family, who settled on East Street around 1678, including Revolutionary War surgeon Dr. Joseph Fiske. Opened in 1949 at 55 Adams Street, it was Lexington's first post-war elementary school and was designed by Adden, Parker, Clinch, and Crimp.

The original building was a one-story rectangular structure with an attached two-story ell, incorporating mid-century construction features such as fiberglass insulation, double-pane glass block windows, and sub-floor radiant steam heating. In 1954, the same firm designed a ten-classroom addition that expanded the school's capacity to 500 students. The 1949 building was replaced by a new facility on the same campus in 2007.

==== Harrington Elementary School ====
Harrington Elementary is named for the Harrington family, whose members included Jonathan Harrington, who was killed at the Battle of Lexington, and his cousin of the same name, the battle's last living survivor.

The original Harrington School at 146 Maple Street was built in 1954 and designed by Leland, Larsen, Bradley & Hibbard. Built as a single-story brick-veneer and wood-frame structure, it served as an elementary school until closing in 2005. Following municipal renovations, the 146 Maple Street building reopened in 2008 as the central administrative offices for Lexington Public Schools. The current Harrington Elementary campus operates out of a modern replacement facility built in 2005.

==== Maria Hastings Elementary School ====
Maria Hastings Elementary is named after Maria Hastings Cary, a local philanthropist who founded Lexington's public library, Cary Library. Originally addressed at 2618 Massachusetts Avenue, the school's official address was changed in 2007 to 7 Crosby Road, a street originally built as the campus driveway.

Designed by Boston architect Charles H. Cole II and opened in 1955, the original building was constructed into a wooded hillside as a two-story structure with grade-level access on both levels. The design featured low-pitched gable roofs, brick exterior walls, sloped interior ceilings reaching 16 feet, floor-to-ceiling window walls, and continuous ridge skylights paired with clerestory windows to bring natural light into the double-loaded corridors. In later decades, insulated modular classrooms were attached directly to the main building via enclosed, heated hallways.

In 2016, the town submitted a Statement of Interest to the Massachusetts School Building Authority (MSBA) to replace the aging facility. Following feasibility studies conducted with Dore & Whittier and DiNisco Design, the 1955 building was demolished between 2018 and 2020 and replaced by a new net-zero energy school.

==== Jonas Clarke Middle School ====
Jonas Clarke Middle School is named after the Reverend Jonas Clarke, a Revolutionary-era minister and political leader in Lexington. Opened in 1972 at 17 Stedman Road as Jonas Clarke Junior High School, the building was designed by Drummey Rosane Anderson.

Constructed as a two-story facility, the building used a poured-in-place concrete frame, concrete block masonry, and split-rib precast concrete exterior panels. Its interior layout incorporated an open-space plan organized around multi-level instructional wings, science laboratories, and athletic facilities. In 1986, the district transitioned Clarke from a grades 7–9 junior high to a grades 6–8 middle school. The building underwent interior and mechanical renovations in 2000, followed by a classroom wing addition designed by DiNisco Design in 2017 to address growing enrollment.

==== William Diamond Middle School ====
William Diamond Middle School is named after William Diamond, the sixteen-year-old drummer boy who sounded the call to arms for the Lexington militia on April 19, 1775. Dedicated in 1959 at 99 Hancock Street as William Diamond Junior High School, the facility was designed by Charles H. Cole II.

Built as a fireproof, two-story structure, Cole's design used a reinforced concrete frame laid out on a 10-foot-2-inch modular grid, paired with uniform brick veneer and continuous bands of exterior windows. The main entrance featured custom decorative wall tiles created by Lexington High School art students. Like Clarke, Diamond was reconfigured from a grades 7–9 junior high into a grades 6–8 middle school in 1986. The school received major structural renovations in 2000, followed by a multi-phase building addition and envelope upgrade completed in 2017–2018.
