= Monument to the March Dead =

Monument in Weimar, Germany

- Denkmal für die Märzgefallenen
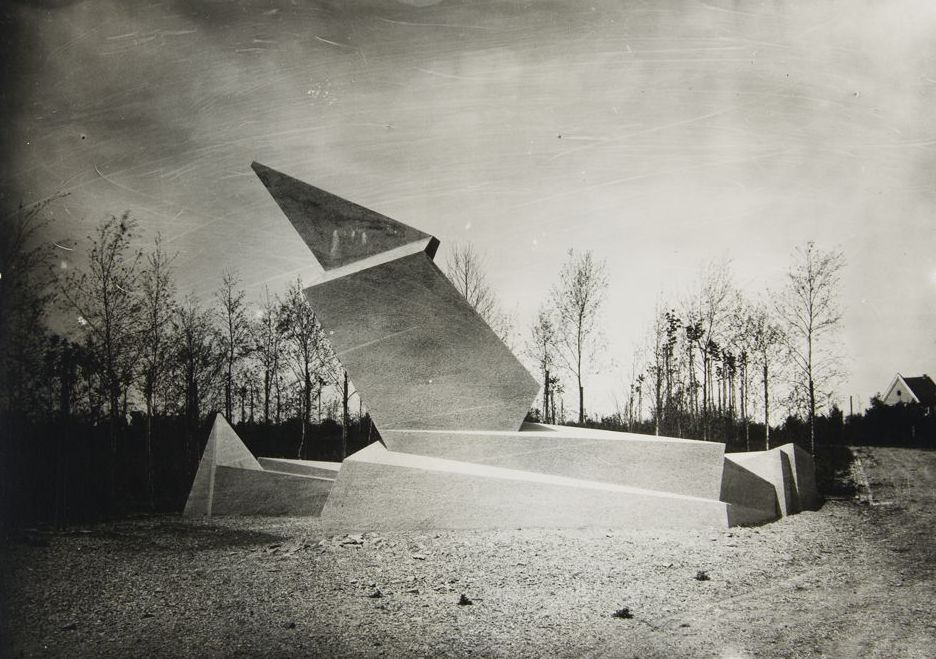
- Interactive map of Monument to the March Dead
- Location: Historical Cemetery, Weimar, Germany
- Coordinates: 50.968063°N 11.321559°E
- Designer: Walter Gropius, Fred Forbát
- Material: concrete
- Dedicated date: May 1, 1922
- Dedicated to: Workers killed in the Kapp Putsch
- Dismantled date: 1936

Monument to the March Dead (German: Denkmal für die Märzgefallenen) is an expressionist monument in the Weimar Central Cemetery in Weimar, Germany, that memorializes workers killed in the 1920 Kapp Putsch. A 1920 design produced by Walter Gropius, in collaboration with Fred Forbát, was selected from those submitted in a competition organized by the Gewerkschaftskartell (Union Cartel) and the Städtisches Museum Weimar (Weimar Municipal Museum).

Although Gropius had said that the Bauhaus should remain politically neutral, he agreed to participate in the competition of Weimar artists at the end of 1920. The monument was built between 1920 and 1922. An unveiling ceremony for the memorial was held on May 1, 1922. Objecting to it politically and as an example of what they called degenerate art, the Nazis destroyed the monument in February 1936. The monument was reconstructed in 1946.

The form of the monument alludes to a thunderbolt. The structure is constructed of concrete. The monument was arranged around an inner space, in which visitors could stand. The repeatedly fractured and highly angular memorial rose up on three sides, as if thrust up from or rammed into the earth.

Theo van Doesburg, leader of the De Stijl movement, criticized Gropius' expressionist design, decrying it as "the result of a cheap literary idea."

== Gallery ==
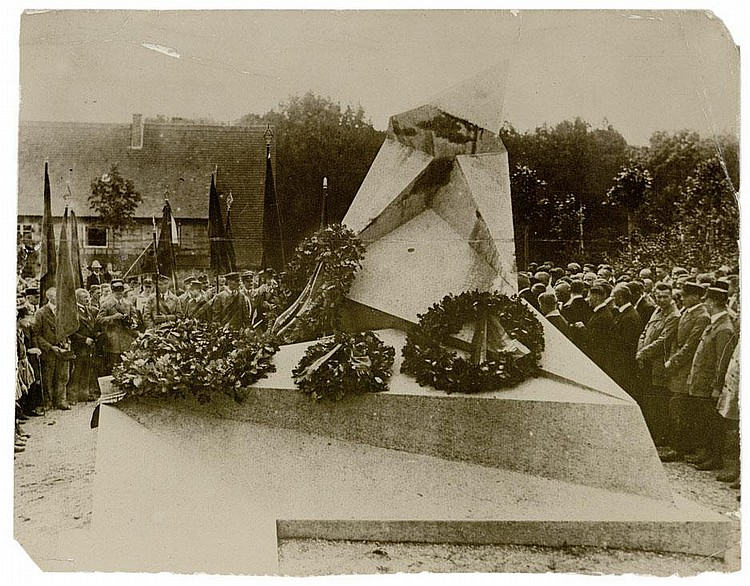
Opening ceremony of the monument

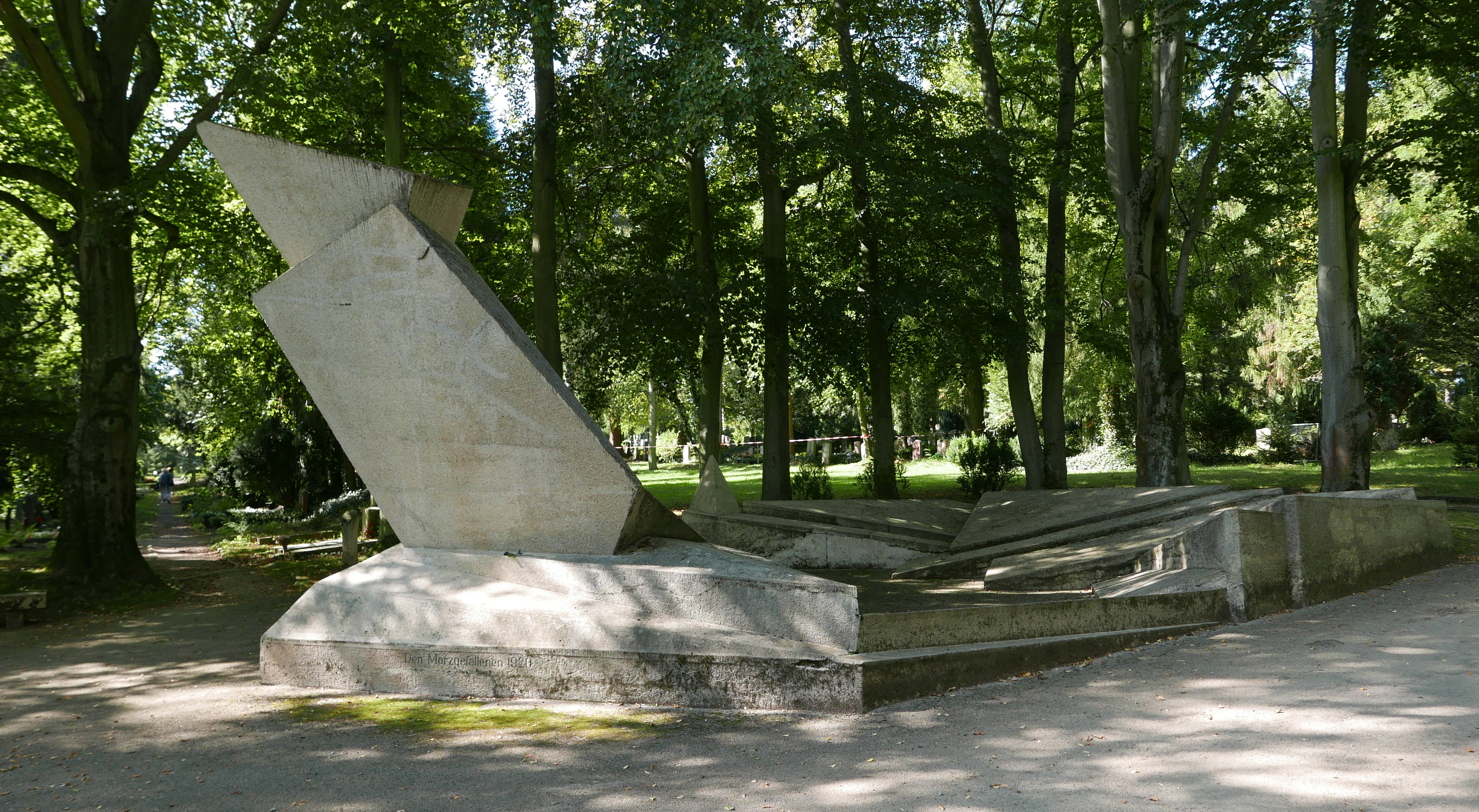
The structure in 2019 in its current form
