= Werner Taesler =

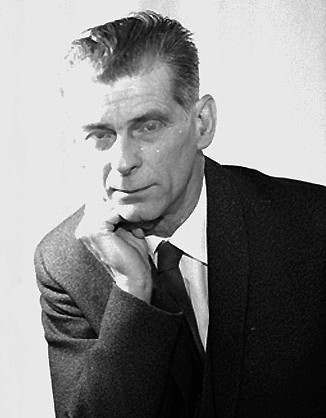
- 1960
- Born: Werner Taesler; 5 November 1907; Teupitz, Germany
- Died: 2 March 1994 (aged 86); Örebro, Sweden
- Occupation: Architect

Werner Taesler (5 November 1907 – 2 March 1994) was a German architect active in the Soviet Union and in Sweden.

== Life ==
In 1927 Werner Taesler took his School Leaving Certificate in Strausberg near Berlin and began to work as a house painter in Berlin, before going to the Art Academy in Kassel in 1928 to study sculpture and architecture. In 1929 he moved to the Bauhaus in Dessau and studied furniture design and architecture. From 1929 to 1931 he studied architecture at the Technische Hochschule Berlin-Charlottenburg (now Technische Universität Berlin). In Berlin too, he was active in the German Communist Party (the KPD) and studied the poor housing conditions of the city with Bruno Taut. In 1931 he organised an exhibition of proletarian architecture under the direction of Arthur Korn. From 1931 to 1935 Taesler worked in the Soviet Union under the Frankfurt urban planner Ernst May as a member of the so-called May Brigade. Here he was active in designing and executing living accommodation in the new industrial centres of the first Five Year Plan, for example, in Kusnetsk, Magnitogorsk and Kemerovo. Because the Gestapo had placed him on a wanted list in Germany and because he was disappointed by the bureaucratic socialism of the Soviet Union, in 1935 he went into exile in Sweden with his wife Irene Wurster, who came from Odessa. It took until 1947 for him to acquire Swedish citizenship, however, for, because of his socialism, he was under observation by the Swedish police. At the same time, he was on the Comintern’s death list as a Trotzkyite. His diary and memoirs, which are of interest with regard to the politics and architecture of his day, were published in 2019 with a commentary by Ekkehard Henschke. They also record his extensive journeys through the Asiatic parts of the Soviet Union. Taesler worked in Sweden at various times with such important representatives of Swedish functionalism as Sven Markelius and Wolter Gahn, who were members of the group ‚acceptera’. At the end of the 1930s he worked in the architectural practice of Kooperativa Förbundet, later in that of Nils Gustav Brink (1912–1983), until he opened his own practice in the Swedish city of Örebro in 1951. Towards the end of World War II Taesler had begun to think about rebuilding the destroyed German cities, and in 1944 with his friend, the architect and urban planner Fred Forbát, he organised, in Stockholm, the first conference of the Internationale Architektengruppe zum Studium von Wiederaufbauproblemen (the Group of International Architects for the Study of the Problems of Reconstruction). In his later years Taesler’s writings concerned themselves with nature conservation and ecological tourism in Sweden.

== Buildings ==
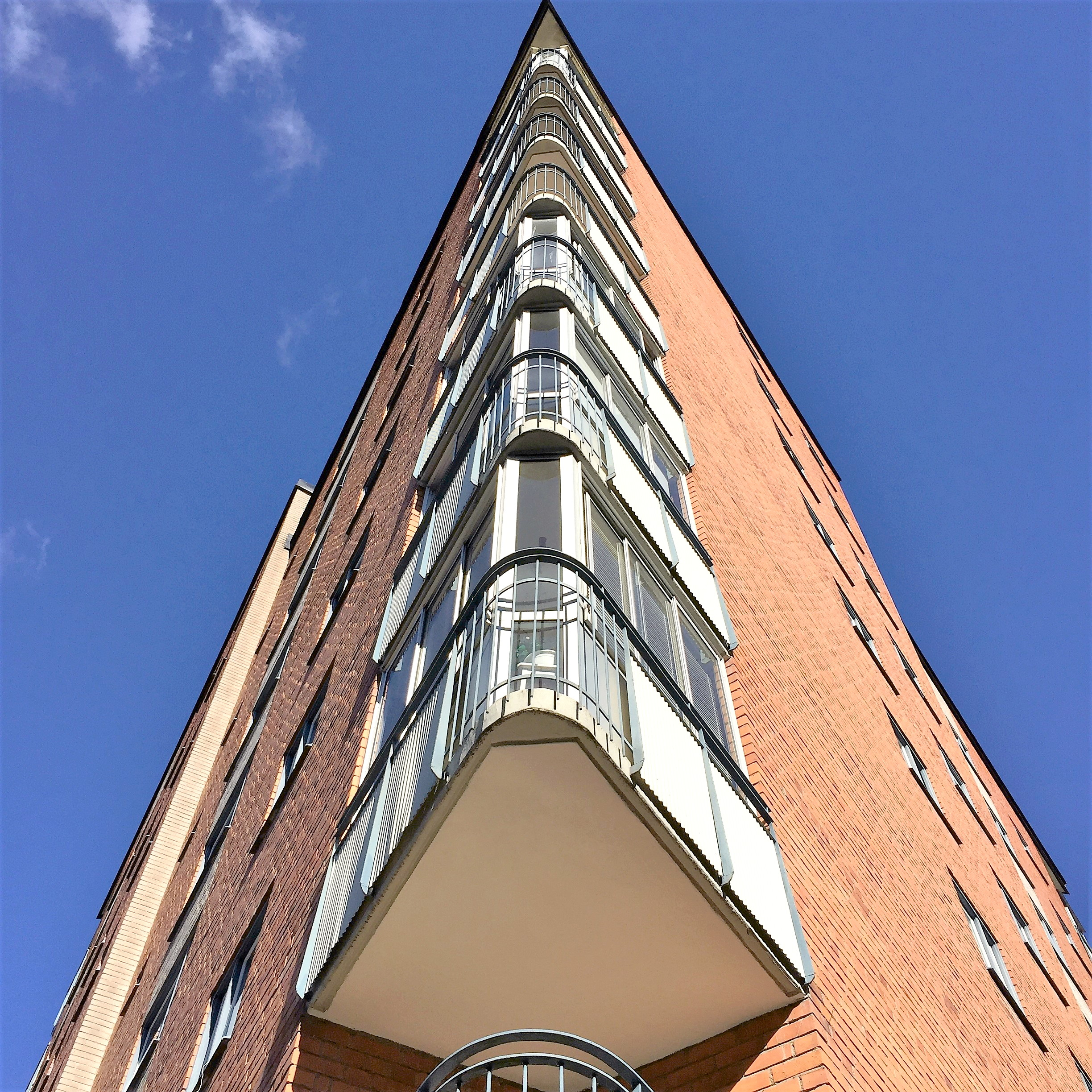
Werner Taesler, Triangle House, Stockholm Fruängen (1957). Photo Ekkehard Henschke

Among others

- Triangle House Development and Living Accommodation in Sweden (Competition 1951)
- Triangle House in Stockholm Fruängen (1957), listed building
- Holiday Complex at Ånnaboda near Örebro (c. 1960)
- Engineering and Technical College in Karlskoga (c. 1965)

== Publications ==
Werner Taesler, Flüchtling in drei Ländern. Ein Bauhaus-Architekt und Sozialist in Deutschland, der Sowjetunion und Schweden. Hrsg. und kommentiert und mit einem Nachwort versehen von Ekkehard Henschke. Stuttgart 2019. ISBN 978-3-95612-108-1

Werner Taesler, Hur land blev landskap [Wie Landschaft aus Land entstand]. Malmö 1985. ISBN 913-861-371-9 [2008 als Hörbuch].

Werner Taesler, Jordbrukarnas bostäder och arbetsplatser i Sovjetunionen [Wohnungen und Arbeitsplätze der Bauern in der Sowjetunion]. In: Byggmästaren, 1935, Nr. 20, S. 112-120.

Werner Taesler, Sjukhusbyggandet i Sovjetunionen [Krankenhausbau in der Sowjetunion]. In: Arkitektur och samhälle. Nr. 1, Jg. 4, 1935, S. 33-52.

Werner Taesler, Bostadsbyggandet i Sovjetunionen [Wohnungsbau in der Sowjetunion]. In: Byggmästaren, 1936, S. 213-226.

== Literature ==
Anne E. Dünzelmann, Stockholmer Spaziergänge. Auf den Spuren deutscher Exilierter 1933-1945. Norderstedt 2017. ISBN 978-3-7448-8399-3 Helmut Müssener, Exil in Schweden. Politische und kulturelle Emigration nach 1933. München 1974 (= Stockholmer germanistische Forschungen; Bd. 14). ISBN 978-3-446-11850-8
