= Adolf Sommerfeld =

German-British architect and builder

Adolf Sommerfeld, also Andrew Sommerfield (May 4, 1886, in Kolmar (today Chodzież in Poland) – February 18, 1964, in Baden AG (Switzerland)) was a German-British architect and builder of Jewish origins.

== Life ==
After an apprenticeship as a carpenter, Sommerfeld created a construction group in Berlin, combining several construction and terrain companies under the umbrella of Allgemeine Häuserbau-Actien-Gesellschaft (AHAG)-Sommerfeld.

In 1923 Sommerfeld financed the construction of the model house Am Horn, which was built for the first Bauhaus exhibition in Weimar from August 15 to September 30, 1923.

From 1922 to 1931 he was married to the writer Renée Brand. In 1926 they had a son. They lived in a house built by Walter Gropius and Adolf Meyer in Limonenstraße in Berlin-Lichterfelde, the Sommerfeld Blockhaus (Limonenstraße 30, 12203 Berlin, partially destroyed). Sommerfeld was friends with the expressionist sculptor Arminius Hasemann.

=== Career as an architect ===
Adolf Sommerfeld left his mark on southwest Berlin. He worked together with the architects Walter Gropius, Alfred Schild, Fred Forbát and Bruno Taut. In Berlin-Zehlendorf, he built the forest settlement Onkel Toms Hütte and ensured the extension of today's U3 subway line from Thielplatz to Krumme Lanke. In 1924, Sommerfeld was commissioned by the League of Nations to build ten thousand houses for Greek refugees from Asia Minor.

His main field of activity was suburban, rational housing and housing estate construction. From 1926 onwards, he was intensively involved in mass housing construction as a solution to urban planning and social problems and advocated the rationalization of the building trade.

In 1927, Sommerfeld acquired 100 hectares in Kleinmachnow from the large landowner Dietloff von Hake. He began building 150 houses in the Düppelpfuhl section in 1932. Sommerfeld marketed the new district with the Siedlungsgesellschaft mbH Kleinmachnow, of which he was the sole shareholder at the end. Despite his emigration in 1933, the settlement was completed by 1938. The settlement was celebrated by the National Socialists as an exemplary German colony.

=== Emigration during the Nazi era 1933–1945 ===
Sommerfeld was Jewish and in March 1933, shortly after the Nazis came to power in Germany, they initiated a shooting in front of his house in Limonenstrasse. Sommerfeld emigrated to Palestine and later to Great Britain. His property was seized. After 1945, he returned as Andrew Sommerfield and filed claims for restitution.

== Honors ==
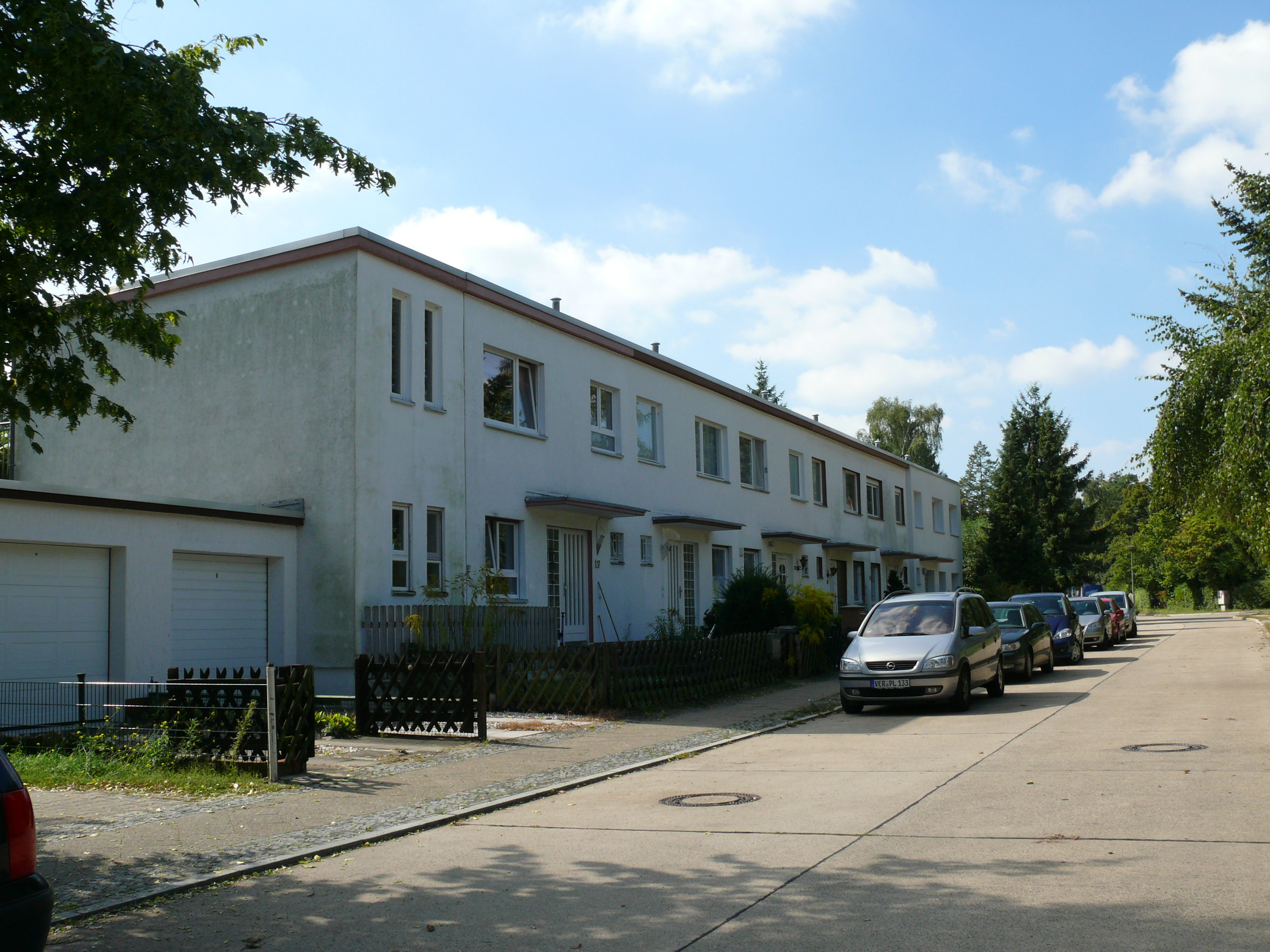
Wannsee Sommerfieldring 03

The Sommerfieldring in Berlin-Wannsee was named after him.

== Literature ==
- Celina Kress: Zwischen Bauhaus und Bürgerhaus – Die Projekte des Berliner Bauunternehmers Adolf Sommerfeld, Diss. 2008
- Celina Kress: Adolf Sommerfeld – Andrew Sommerfield. Bauen für Berlin 1910–1970. Lukas Verlag, Berlin 2011, ISBN 978-3-86732-081-8.
