= Peter Thacher Junior High School =

Coordinates: 41°55′55″N 71°16′47″W

Peter Thacher Junior High School was a middle school located in Attleboro, Massachusetts originally serving grades 7 through 9. It was designed by The Architects' Collaborative with Walter Gropius, and it opened in 1948. The building itself is considered to be one of Gropius' notable works. It was also a school for grades 5–8.

In the late 1990s it was converted to an elementary school, and remains as one currently, with grades pre-K through 4.
