= Alan I W Frank House =

House in Pittsburgh, Pennsylvania

Coordinates: 40.449684°N 79.922498°W

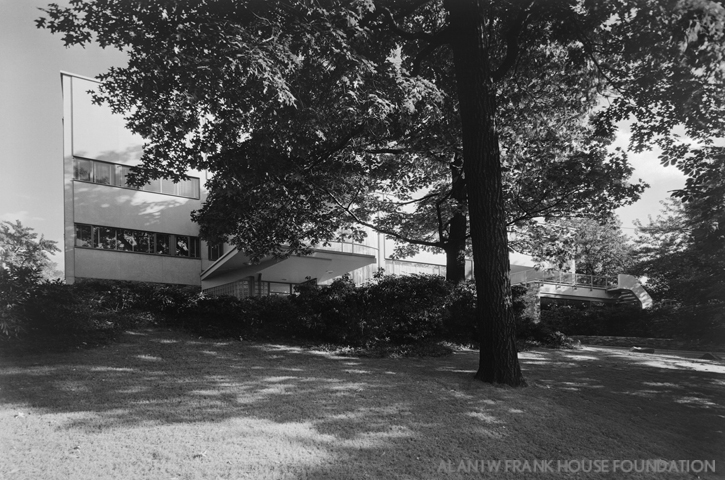
Front view

The Alan I W Frank House is a private residence in Pittsburgh, Pennsylvania, designed by Bauhaus founder Walter Gropius and partner Marcel Breuer, two of the pioneering masters of 20th-century architecture and design. This spacious, multi-level residence, its furnishings and landscaping were all created by Gropius and Breuer as a 'Total Work of Art.' It was their most important residential commission, and it is virtually the same today as when it was built in 1939–40.

== House ==
With four levels of living space and an indoor swimming pool, the main building encloses 12,000 square feet, complete with curved glass facade, nine bedrooms and 13 bathrooms. Including the five terraces that are part of the house and the rooftop dance floor, the floor plan totals 17,000 square feet. The stonework of the exterior walls and the dramatic entry of this innovative house suggest a detailed and richly textured building. Inside, graceful curves prevail throughout with paneled walls of warm pearwood, English sycamore, and redwood, or of travertine or stone.

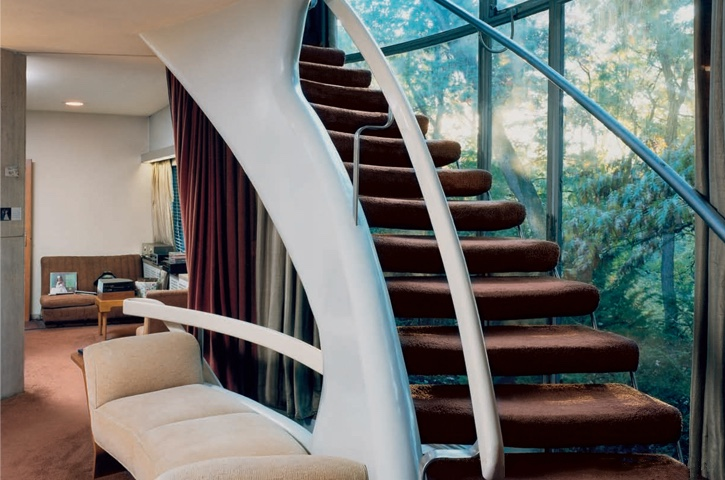
Cantilevered Stair

Barry Bergdoll, the Philip Johnson Chief Curator of Architecture and Design at MoMA wrote in Hauser magazine, "The home's three-story window wall swells in the facade next to the circular stair, which sweeps visitors from the ground floor entry and recreational area to the first-floor living area and then continues to rise to the next level. The stair is a sensuously curved cantilevered stair – the first embodiment of all the cantilevered stairs of independent slab risers that Breuer would make a signature of his American work. The theme is echoed in a sculptural outside stair of concrete taking visitors from the front to the back garden via an open terrace, an alternative dramatic path through the house. Perception of the house includes both theatricality of approach and intimacy of scale. Effects are achieved through natural materials set in contrast with man-made products, through ratios of light and heavy, closed and open, and through dramatic lighting and staging of movement on the wooded sloping site."

Unique features of this home include roof surfaces that support living lawns and contribute to thermal efficiency, innovative electrical and energy management systems that reduce energy use, and one of the first examples of central air conditioning with electrostatic air purification.

== Architectural significance ==
In addition to being the largest residence designed by Gropius and Breuer, the Frank House was also the largest project of any kind that Gropius would undertake between the completion of the Bauhaus buildings in Dessau, Germany in the mid-1920s and the commission for graduate housing granted him after World War II by Harvard. As for Breuer, he would have to wait until 1953, with the design of UNESCO headquarters in Paris, for another architectural commission of such scale. The 17,000-square-foot house is one of the "most important modernist houses in this country" relates Bergdoll.

The Frank House has been described as a unique synthesis between the modernism of the interwar years and the sumptuous ethos of Breuer's so-called New Humanism. As Bergdoll writes in Hauser, "Unlike the Meisterhäuser at Dessau, where a machined aesthetic of stucco rendered walls and floating boxes defined a rigorous geometric approach to composition, the Frank House uses gently swelling curves set in facades of long horizontal lines, exterior walls of warm pink-sand colored Kasota stone over a steel framework, all set upon a rugged base of local field stone, echoed in the garden's terrace walls."

Contemporary critics saw the Frank House as a prime example of a change in direction in the development of modernism. "In its use of random ashlar, stone veneer, travertine and natural wood is indicated a new interest in natural materials. Also worth noting is the disintegration of the rectangle into freer shapes, as in the stairway, garden walls and entrance vestibule. If in so important an example such drastic modifications are to be seen, there is a new and impressive evidence that contemporary architecture is entering a new phase, richer, more assured, and more human."

This trend was borne out in every detail of the house and its furnishings because the project was commissioned as a 'Total Work of Art' whose design included furnishings, fabrics and landscape as well as the home itself. "It's the biggest house they did, and the only house for which they designed every piece of furniture" describes Bergdoll. The Frank House was Gropius's first such commission since the Sommerfeld House in Berlin. It is also the most intact such work, as the Sommerfeld House was destroyed in World War II.

Gropius, Breuer and the Franks envisioned the home's design as skillfully integrating all the requisite disciplines — structure, materials, furnishings and landscape. The commitment to a Total Work of Art gave Breuer responsibility for designing all the furniture and furnishings in the house, from major pieces to details such as door hardware, lighting, light switches and a whole range of novel devices. It would be the single most important commission of his American career for inventing new furniture. Two thirds of the designs Breuer would create during his American years were created for the Frank House and exist nowhere else. Hundreds of new designs were developed, using new ways of shaping and finishing wood and new materials such as DuPont's Lucite polymer, a revolutionary new material at the time.

== History ==
The Frank House took shape in 1939–40 as the grand family home of Cecelia and Robert Frank, the third generation of Pittsburgh industrialists in his family, who had founded and was building a new company, Copperweld Steel. An engineer and inventor, Robert Frank was open to new ideas, including modern architecture. As his family grew, Robert and his wife Cecelia started planning a new home.

Cecelia and Robert considered Walter Gropius, who had recently come to the United States and become head of Harvard's Department of Architecture, to be the world's leading architect. When Gropius came to Pittsburgh to give a talk, Robert attended. Interested in what the new architecture could achieve and its potential to realize their ideals — Cecelia, Robert and their young son Alan met with the architect at his office in Cambridge, Massachusetts, and visited Gropius' home in Lincoln. Long letters followed the meetings, and a collaboration was formed.

Robert Frank contributed significantly to the project as an engaged architectural client. His and Cecelia's correspondence with the architects runs to hundreds of pages. During design and construction, suggestions, instructions and queries sometimes filled three eight-page, single-spaced typewritten letters a week.

Gropius and Breuer came to Pittsburgh many times during the project, first to look at various pieces of land that were for sale, and then repeatedly throughout construction. Cecelia and Robert contracted with a leading national construction company to do the building, and arranged for Pittsburgh architect Dahlen Ritchey, who had been a promising student of Gropius at Harvard, to supervise the construction.

The project was completed in 1940. It became, as one scholar describes it, "a machine for living," especially for healthy, comfortable living. Its sunlit rooms, outdoor terraces and indoor pool provided a warm and friendly environment in which to raise a young family. In addition to its advanced architecture and furnishings, the home incorporated an integral system for cleaning air, an innovative internal phone and light signal system, built-in projection equipment to turn the recreation room into a movie theater, lightning rod systems made of Robert Frank's Copperweld, and a heating and cooling system that used the water from the indoor swimming pool for thermal management and energy conservation.

In 1941 the home was profiled in Architectural Forum. Photos were taken of the home and furnishings by renowned architectural photographer Ezra Stoller. In the decades that followed, the home fulfilled its promise as an environment designed for family life, and Cecelia's active involvement with the Pittsburgh arts and education communities made the home a well-known site for cultural and social events.

== The Frank House today ==
The Frank family has owned and occupied the home continuously since it was completed. The family's dedication to preserving the work of Gropius and Breuer has kept the original features and furnishings intact, making the home a valuable example of a unique turning point in the timeline of modern architecture.

Seventy years after its first review, the home is still recognized by architectural scholars as a significant milestone in the history of modernism. Scholars and critics who have visited the site are unanimous in their understanding of its importance as a masterpiece that must be preserved. John Carter Brown III, director of the National Gallery of Art in Washington, described the house as "the nation's crown jewel." Toshiko Mori, Chair of the Department of Architecture at Harvard University's Graduate School of Design, said the experience of visiting is "one of those rare occasions when you enter a house and it's absolutely authentic. Mr. Frank preserved the house in its totality — equipment, furniture, fixtures, even original textiles and wall coverings. It's all intact. It's a very exquisite balance of architectural proportions, textures and colorations with machine-age aesthetics. Everything is very functional." Barry Bergdoll, Chief Curator, MoMA Department of Architecture and Design, who is using the house and its trove of correspondence as part of an extended study of Marcel Breuer, described the Frank House as "an exceptional historical document, as well as a major monument of American architectural art and architectural history."

Robert and Cecelia's son, Alan I W Frank, has established the Alan I W Frank House Foundation as a 501(c)(3) public charity to preserve the home. The Foundation's development plan includes the acquisition and restoration of the land and buildings, initial operating expenses, and an endowment for ongoing operation of the home as a museum. In June 2011, restoration work began on the home's exterior and roof.

In June 2013, the Alan I W Frank House Foundation announced the return of four pieces of the original Marcel Breuer furniture to the Foundation for preservation and future exhibition. The desk, desk chair, armchair and table were created by Breuer for the Frank House in 1940. They were designed in wood, Lucite and natural upholstery, and some were made by American manufacturer Schmieg & Kotzian. For the last eight years, they have been on exhibition at the Carnegie Museum of Art through the efforts of former director Richard Armstrong, and the support of the Hillman Foundation. They are four of the hundreds of pieces of furniture that Breuer designed for the home.

== Sources ==
- Shaw, Kurt. "Shadyside home an architectural gem." Greensburg Tribune-Review, June 26, 2005.
- Pitz, Marylynne. "Architecturally significant Frank House a museum." Pittsburgh Post-Gazette, August 26, 2006.
- Blake, Peter. Marcel Breuer: Architect and Designer. New York: Museum of Modern Art, 1949: 74–75.
- Giedion, S. Walter Gropius: Work and Teamwork. New York, Reinhold, 1954: 187.
- Berdini, Paolo. Walter Gropius: Works and Projects. Editorial Gustavo Gili, S.A., 1994: 176–177.
- Kidney, Walter C. Pittsburgh's Landmark Architecture: The Historic Buildings of Pittsburgh and Allegheny County. Pittsburgh, Pittsburgh History & Landmarks Foundation, 1997: 408.
- Bergdoll, Barry. "Hidden Masterpiece." Modern, Fall 2012: 138–143
