= Adolf Meyer (architect) =

German architect

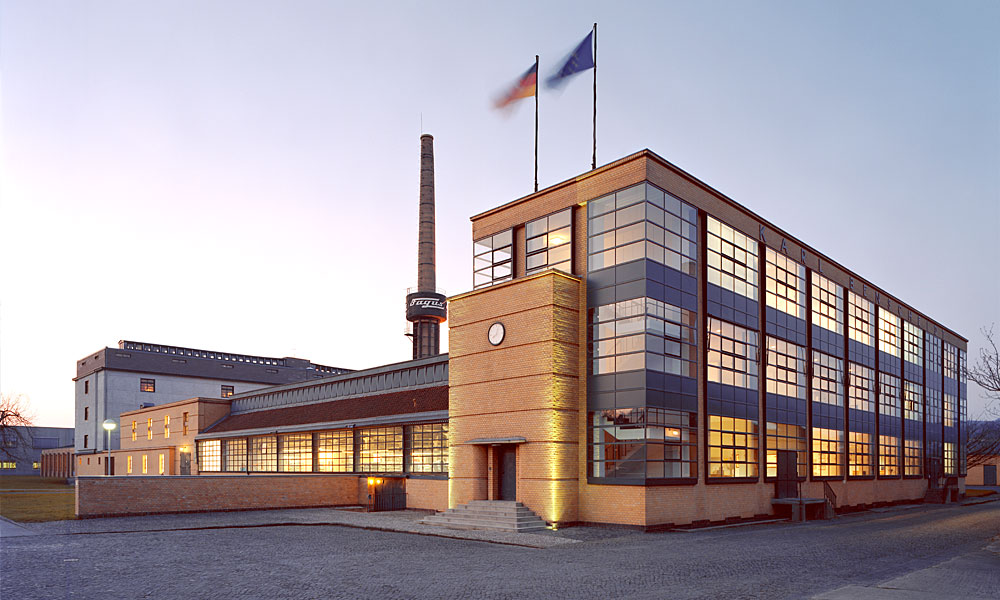
Fagus factory, Alfeld

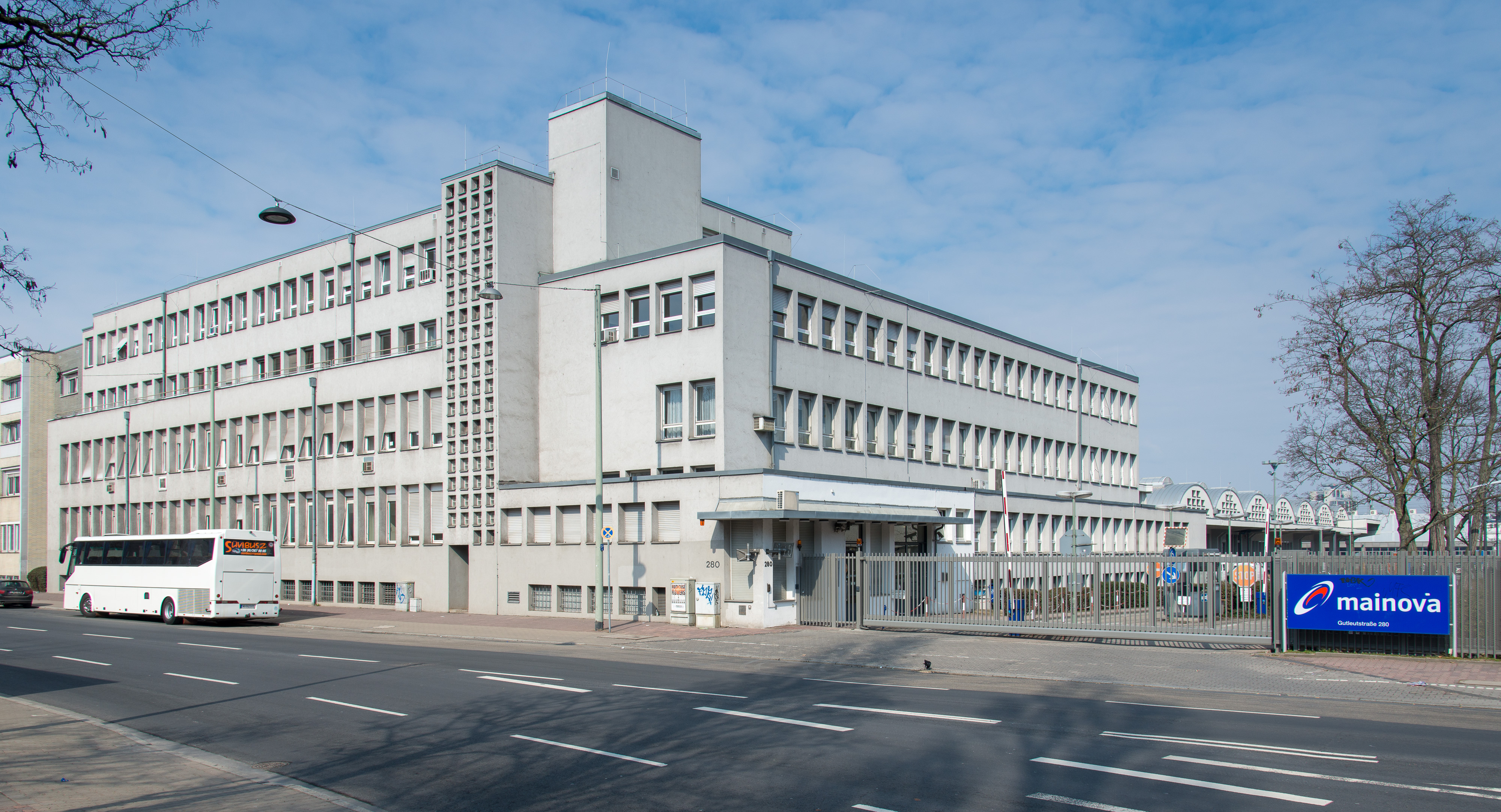
Elektrizitätswerk, Frankfurt Gutleutstraße

Adolf Meyer (17 June 1881, Mechernich – 14 July 1929, the Island of Baltrum) was a German architect.

A student and employee of both Bruno Paul and Peter Behrens, Meyer became the office boss of the firm of Walter Gropius around 1915 and a full partner afterwards. In 1919, Gropius appointed Meyer as a master at the Bauhaus, where he taught work drawing and construction technique. Between 1920 and 1921, Gropius and Meyer worked together to create the architectural design for the Sommerfeld House. Meyer is also credited as co-designer of the Gropius entry for the 1922 Chicago Tribune Tower competition.

From 1926, he practiced as an architect in the New Frankfurt project.

== Literature ==
- Susan R. Henderson. "Building Culture: Ernst May and the New Frankfurt Initiative, 1926–1931." Peter Lang, 2013.
