= Sommerfeld House =

Historic house in Berlin

The Sommerfeld House, constructed between 1920 and 1921, was the first major joint project completed by the Bauhaus school. The house was built in Berlin as a villa for Adolf Sommerfeld who was a building contractor, lumbermill owner, and real-estate developer.

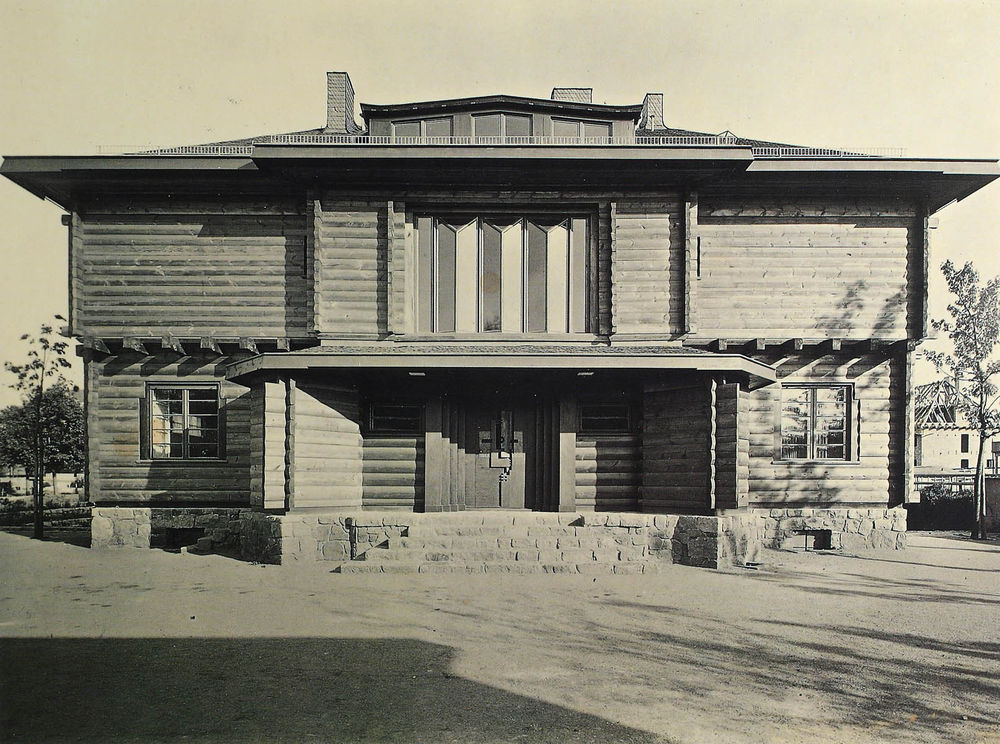
Sommerfeld House

== Background ==
The Bauhaus school struggled financially and had not yet the opportunity to implement their goal of creating a project utilising the different fields of the school. This changed in 1920 when Adolf Sommerfeld gave a private commission to Walter Gropius to build a personal villa for him in Berlin. The house was built from the wood of a salvaged battleship which Sommerfeld had purchased. The architectural design was to be created by Walter Gropius and Adolf Meyer and the interior and its furnishings were to be built and designed by the best students of the Bauhaus. The creation of the Sommerfeld House also led to the first major conflict within the Bauhaus. Johannes Itten disagreed with taking private commissions altogether while Gropius believed that they were necessary to keep the Bauhaus afloat financially and to avoid the school becoming "an island of recluses."

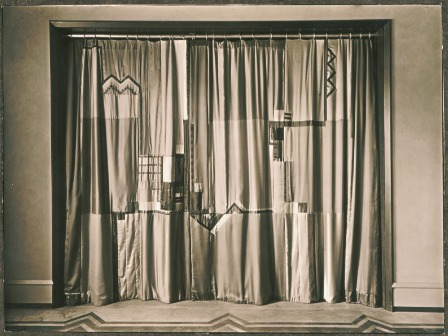
Curtain in the Sommerfeld House

== Creation and design ==
Many of the best students and faculty worked together for the project, each focusing on a particular aspect of the house and its interior and furnishings. Josef Albers created the large stained-glass window above the stairs. Dörte Helm, who was a student in the weaving workshop, created a large curtain for the house. Hinnerk Scheper and the mural painting workshop designed the interior color schemes. Marcel Breuer designed the chairs and tables. Lighting fixtures and other metal elements were designed in the school's metal workshop. The house was also full of wooden carvings created by Joost Schmidt who included various geometric shapes such as triangles, circles, zigzags, and squares, in addition to human shapes, industrial scenes, Stars of David, and the names of cities and towns which Sommerfeld was associated with. The designs of the house reflect the Expressionist influence that was part of the early Bauhaus. The architectural design of the house also shows influence from the Prairie Houses of Frank Lloyd Wright. All of the different workshops and elements of the school coming together was meant to be the realization of the Gesamtkunstwerk ("total work of art"), which had been one of the goals of the early Bauhaus. There was a large ceremony to celebrate the completion of the house at which the men of the school wore neckerchiefs and the women headscarves which were specially designed to present a uniform and homogeneous image.

== Later years ==
The house was mostly destroyed during World War II.
