= Renée Brand =

German-Jewish writer and psychologist

Renée Brand (née Renate Johanna Brand, also Renée Johanna Brand-Sommerfeld, pseudonym Yolan Mervelt) (born February 22, 1900, in Berlin; died November 5, 1980, in San Francisco) was a German-Jewish writer and psychologist. She is one of the German exile writers.

== Biography ==
She grew up in Berlin and went to school in England. At the beginning of the First World War she returned to Berlin and attended the Fürstin-Bismarck-Lyceum. She studied after graduating from high school in Berlin and Freiburg im Breisgau. She dropped out of her studies on the occasion of her marriage in 1922 to the Berlin contractor Adolf Sommerfeld, who was patron of the Bauhaus and knew a number of artists of the Weimar Republic. They had a son in 1926. In Berlin-Dahlem they lived in a house built by Walter Gropius and Adolf Meyer, the Blockhaus Sommerfeld (Limonenstraße 30, 12203 Berlin, destroyed).

In 1931, Renee Brand divorced her husband. After the Nazis seized power, she emigrated with her son to France and to Basel in Switzerlandin early 1934. From 1936 she studied Romance Studies, Art History, German Studies with Friedrich Ranke and Walter Muschg. He advised her on her first literary works. In 1938, under the pseudonym Yolan Mervelt, she submitted the story Kleine Hand in my Hand, where are we going? at a literary competition published by the American Guild for German Cultural Freedom.

In her 1940 work No Man's Land, she described the desperate situation of emigrants who had to wait in the no man's land off the Swiss border during the Second World War, some of whom illegally overcame the border with Switzerland and were returned from Switzerland. The Swiss censorship authority Swiss Book Surveillance Authority banned the text after its publication. Renée Brand then went into exile with her son in 1941 in the US, where a year later the translation of no man's land was published under the title Short Days Ago.

She received her doctorate in 1943 and worked as a German teacher at Stanford University.

From 1944 to 1949 she studied in Los Angeles. She became a member of the C. G. Jung Institute and opened her own practice in San Francisco. With lectures and the publication of specialist literature, she dealt in particular with the works of Erich Neumann and advised on the translation of his texts.

== Works ==
- Little hand in my hand, where are we going? 1938 (competition entry, lost).
- No man's land. Zurich/New York: Oprecht, 1940; Short Days Ago. Transl. by Margaret H. Beigel, New York : Farrar & Rinehart, 1941.
- To the interpretation of the "Ackermann from Bohemia". Basel: Schwabe, 1943. (Phil. Diss., 1943).
- The Experiment. San Francisco, Calif.: C.G. Jung Institute of San Francisco, 1981.

== Literature ==
- Renate Wall: Lexikon deutschsprachiger Schriftstellerinnen im Exil 1933–1945, Gießen: Haland & Wirth, 2004, ISBN 3-89806-229-5, S. 52–54.
- Dorothee Schaffner, Urs Kaegi: Wenn die Ersatzbank zum Dauersitz wird : Jungerwachsene in der Sozialhilfe, Basel : Basler Institut für Sozialforschung und Sozialplanung der Fachhochschule für Soziale Arbeit beider Basel, 2004 (Impact, Nr. 10/2004), S. 6.
- Regula Wyss, Nachwort, in: Renee Brand, Niemandsland, 1995, ISBN 3-905493-77-2
- Deutsches Exilarchiv 1933–1945; Katalog der Bücher und Broschüren, Deutsche Bibliothek Frankfurt am Main. [Red.: Mechthild Hahner]. Stuttgart : Metzler, 1989, ISBN 3-476-00657-3, Nr. 600.
- Wilhelm Sternfeld: Deutsche Exil-Literatur 1933–1945: Eine Bio-Bibliographie, 2. Aufl., Heidelberg: Schneider, 1970, S. 68.
