= Back Bay Center =

Coordinates: 42.347447°N 71.082464°W

General information
- Status: Unexecuted
- Location: Boston, Massachusetts
- Client: Stevens Development Corporation

Design and construction
- Architecture firm: Boston Center Architects

The Back Bay Center is an unexecuted building complex in Boston, Massachusetts. The project was proposed by real estate developer Roger L. Stevens on a former rail yard of the Boston and Albany Railroad. The project was designed by a consortium of architects that called itself the Boston Center Architects, composed of Pietro Belluschi, Walter Bogner, Walter Gropius, Carl Koch, and Hugh Stubbins. The design was completed in the summer of 1953 and was unveiled that September. Over the next two years, Stevens fought to obtain a tax concession from the city. When this was blocked by the Massachusetts Supreme Court, he backed out of the project. In 1957, Stevens sold his option on the land to the Prudential Insurance Company, who reconstituted the project as the Prudential Center from a design by Charles Luckman.

== History ==
In 1953, real estate developer Roger L. Stevens obtained a three-year option on a 30-acre former railroad yard owned by the Boston and Albany Railroad. Stevens envisioned a mixed-use development that would lure residents back to the city center in the face of increasing suburbanization. Stevens formed the Stevens Development Corporation to promote the project.

In the spring of 1953, Pietro Belluschi, Walter Bogner, Walter Gropius, Carl Koch, and Hugh Stubbins joined together to form the Boston Center Architects. As each of the architects had his own practice, the group opened a new office with a separate staff. Gropius was appointed the BCA's chairman, Stubbins vice-chairman, Belluschi treasurer, and Bogner and Koch deputy administrators. In May they signed a contract with Stevens. The group would be remunerated for operating expenses but would not be paid for the design. However, the contract stipulated that if the project proceeded, they would be retained as its architects.

The group met in June and devised the overall concept for the project. As Belluschi, Gropius, and Bogner left for the summer, design work was done primarily by Hugh Stubbins and Norman Fletcher, both of Gropius's firm The Architects Collaborative. The group reconvened in late August, by which time Stubbins and Fletcher had prepared drawings and a model.

The plan was proposed be built on the Boston and Albany Rail Yard. It was to contain four large office buildings, a shopping center, a convention hall, a hotel and a motel. One key goal of the plan was to make the center accessible to the automobile, in order to make the site competitive with suburban shopping centers. The initial project was ultimately prevented from moving forward because the Massachusetts Supreme Judicial Court ruled that the railroad yards could not be considered "blighted" and that giving investors a tax concession for the project would have been an inappropriate use of public money for private development.

=== Sale of the project to Prudential ===
In January 1957, the Prudential Insurance Company announced that it would develop the site as the "Prudential Center." Before Prudential purchased the air rights to the parcel in 1957, they consulted with the Back Bay Center designers, but decided to hire Charles Luckman to design Prudential Center instead. A tax concession was ultimately achieved through legislation in 1960 that extended the power of the Boston Redevelopment Authority (BRA) to contain the planning function. The BRA declared the rail yards, now abandoned, to be a blighted area, and Prudential was able to develop the site with a tax concession.
