= Fred Forbát =

Hungarian architect (1897–1972)

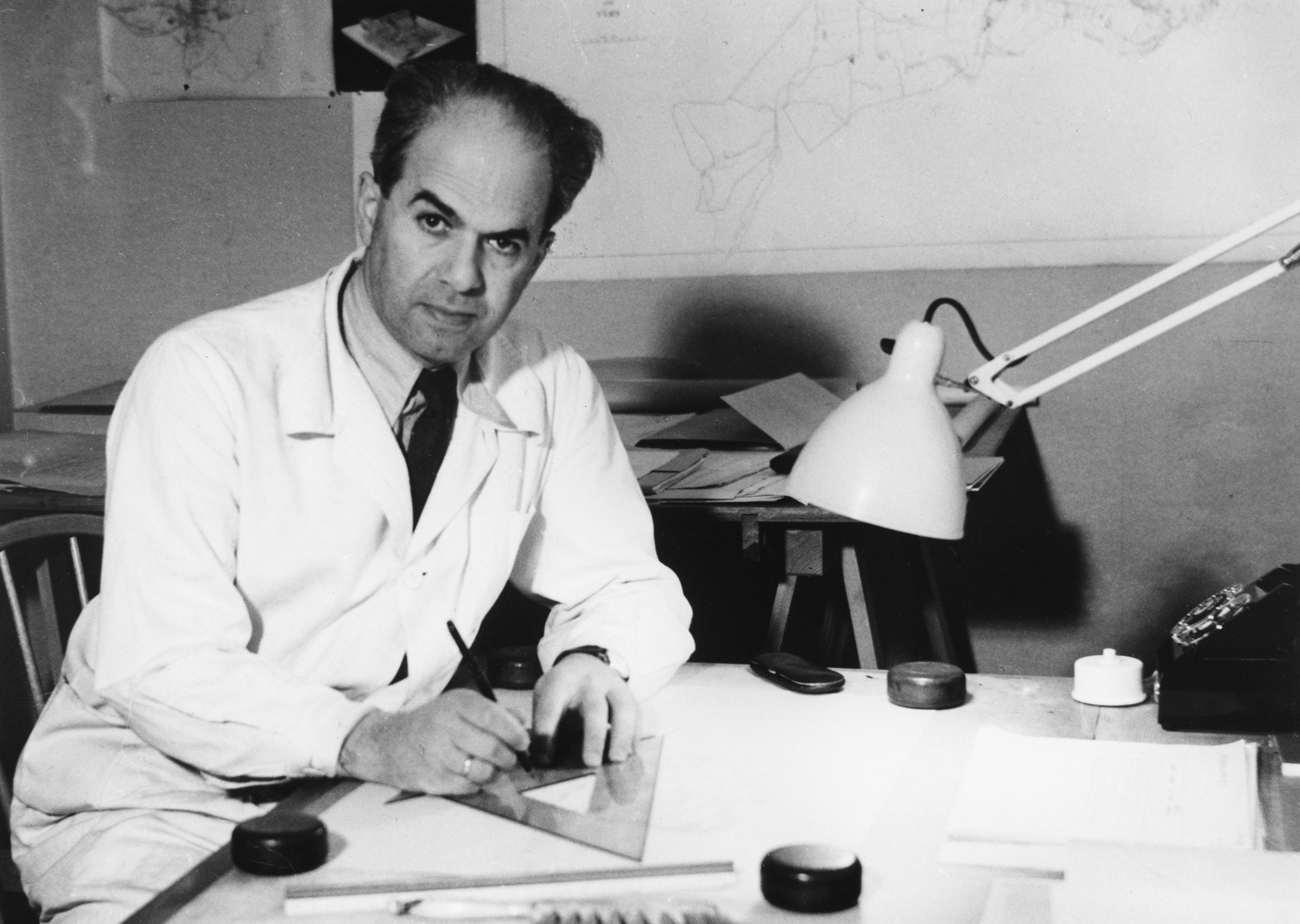
- Born: Alfréd Forbát; 31 March 1897; Pécs, Hungary, Austria-Hungary
- Died: 22 May 1972 (aged 75); Vällingby, Sweden
- Resting place: Skogskyrkogården, Stockholm
- Other name: Alfred Füchsl
- Education: University of Budapest; Technical University of Munich
- Occupation: Architect
- Projects: Siemensstadt, Haselhorst

Signature
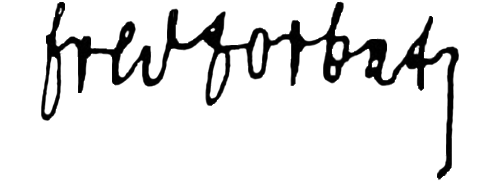

Alfréd Forbát (Also Alfred Füchsl; 31 March 1897 – 22 May 1972) was a Hungarian architect, urban planner, professor and painter who worked in Germany, Hungary, Greece, the Soviet Union and Sweden. He is considered an important representative of the Bauhaus modern.

== Life and work ==
He was born to Jewish parents in Pécs, then part of Austria-Hungary. He studied architecture and art history at the University of Budapest and the Technical University of Munich. From 1920–22 Forbát worked intermittently with Walter Gropius and taught at the Bauhaus in its first incarnation, in Weimar.

From 1923 to 1924 he worked as a freelance architect in Weimar and with the MA Group in Vienna. Then from 1924 to 1925 he worked for the League of Nations as the technical leader for a housing development in Thessaloniki, the capital city of Greek Macedonia. From 1925 to 1928 he was the lead architect at Sommerfeld Co. in Berlin, and from 1928 to 1932 he worked in the architectural office of Hubert Hoffmann, developing the Berlin housing projects Siemensstadt (1930) and Haselhorst (1931).

Between 1932 and 1933 he worked in Moscow on a town planning project for the Russian state-run planning organisation Standardgorprojek, together with Ernst May.

In 1938 he briefly returned to Hungary as a freelance architect, and was responsible for a number of tenements and free-standing houses there. Later that same year he traveled to Stockholm, where he began a long-term association. He worked for the Urban Ministry, then became a member of the city planning group "Eglers Stadsplanebyrå". He was partly responsible for master plans for Skövde (1949), Landskrona (1951), Upplands Väsby (then, Hammarby kommun, 1951), Kullabygden (1959), Linköping (1967) and Kristinehamn. In 1952 Forbát was co-organizer of the 1952 special (non-congress) meeting of CIAM in Sigtuna (Sweden), and also helped organize the 1957 Interbau project in Berlin. His papers are held by the Swedish Museum of Architecture in Stockholm.

He died in Vällingby, Sweden in 1972, aged 75, his grave is located in the memorial grove in Skogskyrkogården.
