= Walter Gropius =

German-American architect (1883–1969)

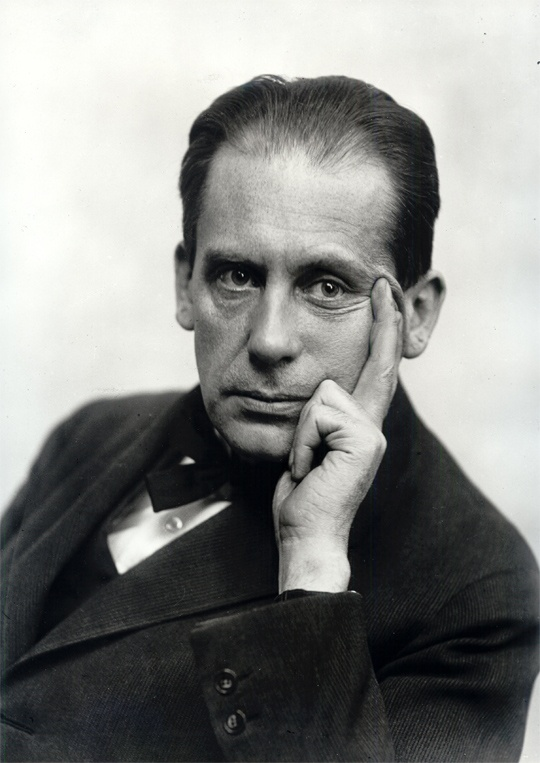
- Portrait by Louis Held, c. 1919
- Born: Walter Adolph Georg Gropius; 18 May 1883; Berlin, Kingdom of Prussia, German Empire
- Died: 5 July 1969 (aged 86); Boston, Massachusetts, U.S.
- Occupation: Architect
- Spouses: Alma Mahler (m. 1915; div. 1920); Ise Gropius (m. 1923)
- Children: 2, including Manon
- Awards: AIA Gold Medal (1959); Albert Medal (1961); Goethe Prize (1961)
- Practice: Peter Behrens (1908–1910); The Architects' Collaborative (1945–1969)
- Buildings: Fagus Factory; Werkbund Exhibition (1914); Bauhaus; Gropius House; University of Baghdad; J.F. Kennedy Federal Building; Pan Am Building

Signature
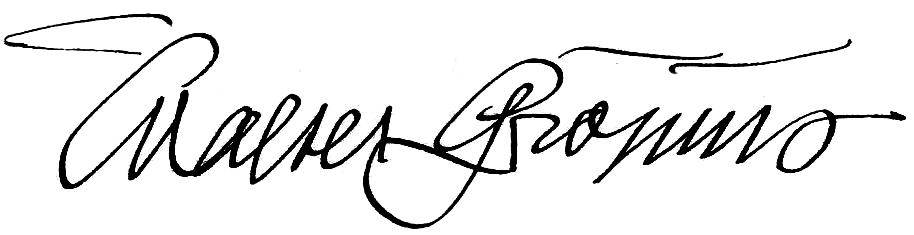

Walter Adolph Georg Gropius (German: [ˈvaltɐ ˈadɔlf ˈɡeːɔʁk ˈɡʁoːpiʊs]; 18 May 1883 – 5 July 1969) was a German-American architect and founder of the Bauhaus School, who is widely regarded as one of the pioneering masters of modernist architecture. He was a founder of Bauhaus in Weimar and taught there for several years, becoming known as a leading proponent of the International Style. Gropius emigrated from Germany to England in 1934 and from England to the United States in 1937, where he spent much of the rest of his life teaching at the Harvard Graduate School of Design. In the United States he worked on several projects with Marcel Breuer and with the firm The Architects Collaborative, of which he was a founding partner. In 1959, he won the AIA Gold Medal, one of the most prestigious awards in architecture.

== Early life and family ==
Born in Berlin, Walter Gropius was the third child of Walter Adolph Gropius and Manon Auguste Pauline Scharnweber (1855–1933), daughter of the Prussian politician Georg Scharnweber (1816–1894). Walter's great-uncle Martin Gropius (1824–1880) was the architect of the Kunstgewerbemuseum in Berlin and a follower of Karl Friedrich Schinkel, with whom Walter's great-grandfather Carl Gropius, who fought under Field Marshal Gebhard Leberecht von Blücher at the Battle of Waterloo, had shared a flat as a bachelor.

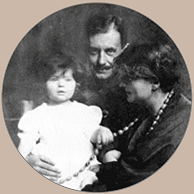
Gropius in 1918, with his wife Alma Mahler and their daughter, Manon

In 1915, Gropius married Alma Mahler (1879–1964), widow of Gustav Mahler. Walter and Alma's daughter, named Manon after Walter's mother, was born in 1916. When Manon died of polio at age 18, in 1935, composer Alban Berg wrote his Violin Concerto in memory of her (it is inscribed "to the memory of an angel"). Gropius and Mahler divorced in 1920 (She had by that time established a relationship with Franz Werfel, whom she later married).

Gropius married Ilse Frank, known as Ise, on 16 October 1923; they remained together until his death in 1969. The couple adopted Beate Frank (known as Ati), the orphaned daughter of Ise's sister Hertha. Ise Gropius died on 9 June 1983 in Lexington, Massachusetts.

Walter's sister Manon Burchard (1880–1975) is the great-grandmother of the German film and theater actresses Marie Burchard and Bettina Burchard, and of the curator and art historian Wolf Burchard.

== Career ==
=== Early career (1908–1918) ===
In 1908, after studying architecture in Munich and Berlin for four semesters, Gropius joined the office of the architect and industrial designer Peter Behrens, one of the first members of the utilitarian school. His fellow employees at this time included Ludwig Mies van der Rohe, Le Corbusier, and Dietrich Marcks.

Gropius left the firm of Behrens in 1910 and established a practice in Berlin with fellow employee Adolf Meyer. Together they share credit for one of the pioneering modernist buildings created during this period: the Faguswerk in Alfeld-an-der-Leine, Germany, a shoe last factory. Although Gropius and Meyer only designed the facade, the glass curtain walls of this building demonstrated both the modernist principle that form reflects function and Gropius's concern with providing healthful conditions for the working class.

The factory is now regarded as one of the crucial founding monuments of European modernism. Gropius was commissioned in 1913 to design a car for the Prussian Railroad Locomotive Works in Königsberg. This locomotive was unique and the first of its kind in Germany and perhaps in Europe.

Other works of this early period include the office and factory building for the Werkbund Exhibition (1914) in Cologne.

Gropius published an article about "The Development of Industrial Buildings" in 1913, which included about a dozen photographs of factories and grain elevators in North America. A very influential text, this article had a strong influence on other European modernists, including Le Corbusier and Erich Mendelsohn, both of whom reprinted Gropius's grain elevator pictures between 1920 and 1930.

Gropius in his sergeant's uniform during World War I

Gropius's career was interrupted by the outbreak of World War I in 1914. He was drafted in August 1914 and served as a sergeant major at the Western front during the war years (getting wounded and almost killed) and then as a lieutenant in the signal corps. Gropius was awarded the Iron Cross twice ("when it still meant something," he confided to his friend Chester Nagel) after fighting for four years. Gropius then, like his father and his great-uncle Martin Gropius before him, became an architect.

Following the German Revolution in 1918, Gropius joined the November Group and the Workers Council for Art, both of which were radical groups of artists that sought to revolutionize art.

=== Bauhaus period (1919–1932) ===
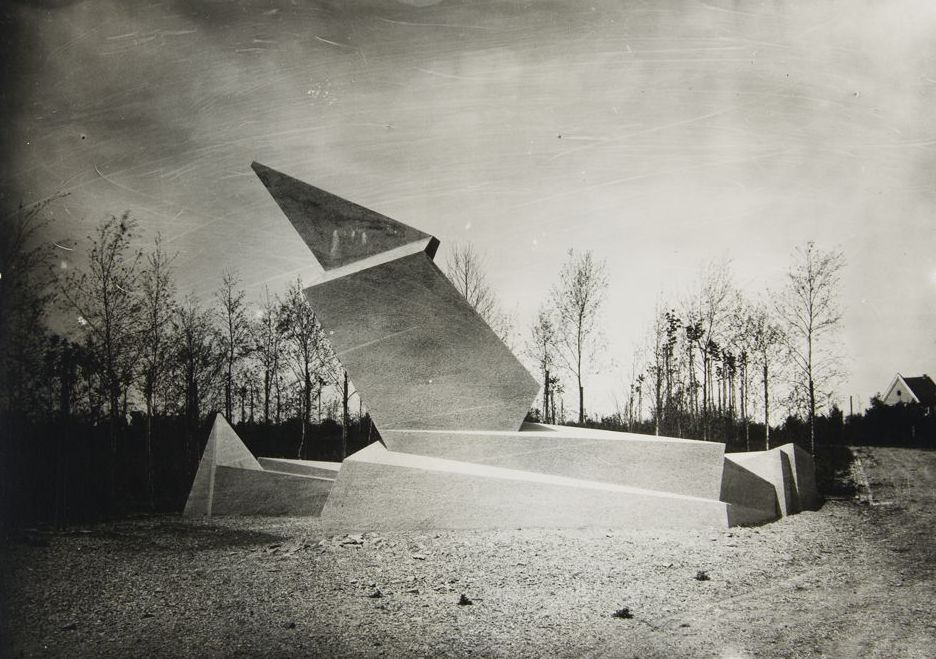
Gropius's Monument to the March Dead (1921) was dedicated to the memory of nine workers who died in Weimar resisting the Kapp Putsch.

Gropius's career advanced in the postwar period. Henry van de Velde, the master of the Grand-Ducal Saxon School of Arts and Crafts in Weimar was asked to step down in 1915 due to his Belgian nationality. His recommendation for Gropius to succeed him led eventually to Gropius's appointment as master of the school in 1919. It was this academy which Gropius transformed into the world-famous Bauhaus (a.k.a. Gropius School of Arts), attracting a faculty that included Paul Klee, Johannes Itten, Josef Albers, Herbert Bayer, László Moholy-Nagy, Otto Bartning and Wassily Kandinsky.

In principle, the Bauhaus represented an opportunity to extend beauty and quality to every home through well designed industrially produced objects. The Bauhaus program was experimental and the emphasis was theoretical. One example product of the Bauhaus was the armchair F51, designed for the Bauhaus's directors room in 1920. (Nowadays there is a re-edition in the market, manufactured by the German company TECTA/Lauenfoerde.)

In 1919, Gropius was involved in the Glass Chain utopian expressionist correspondence under the pseudonym "Mass". Usually more notable for his functionalist approach, the Monument to the March Dead, designed in 1919 and executed in 1920, indicates that expressionism was an influence on him at that time. In 1920, the Bauhaus was given its first major commission that would utilize almost all of the workshops in the school. This commission was for a house for Adolf Sommerfeld made from wood. The architectural designs for the house came from Gropius and Adolf Meyer. The Sommerfeld House was completed in 1921.

In 1923, Gropius designed his famous door handles, now considered an icon of 20th-century design and often listed as one of the most influential designs to emerge from Bauhaus. Facing political and financial difficulties in Weimar, Gropius and the Bauhaus moved to Dessau in 1925 following an offer from the city. Gropius designed the new Bauhaus Dessau school building in 1925–26 on commission from the city of Dessau. He collaborated with Carl Fieger, Ernst Neufert and others within his private architectural practice. Gropius also designed the Master Houses (Meisterhäuser) (1925–1926) in Dessau, along with the Törten Housing Estate (Siedlung Dessau-Törten) which was built from 1926 to 1928. In 1927 he designed the Dessau City Employment office (Arbeitsamt), but left the Bauhaus and Dessau before construction began. The City Employment office was completed in 1929. He also designed large-scale housing projects in Berlin, Karlsruhe that were major contributions to the New Objectivity movement, including a contribution to the Siemensstadt project in Berlin.

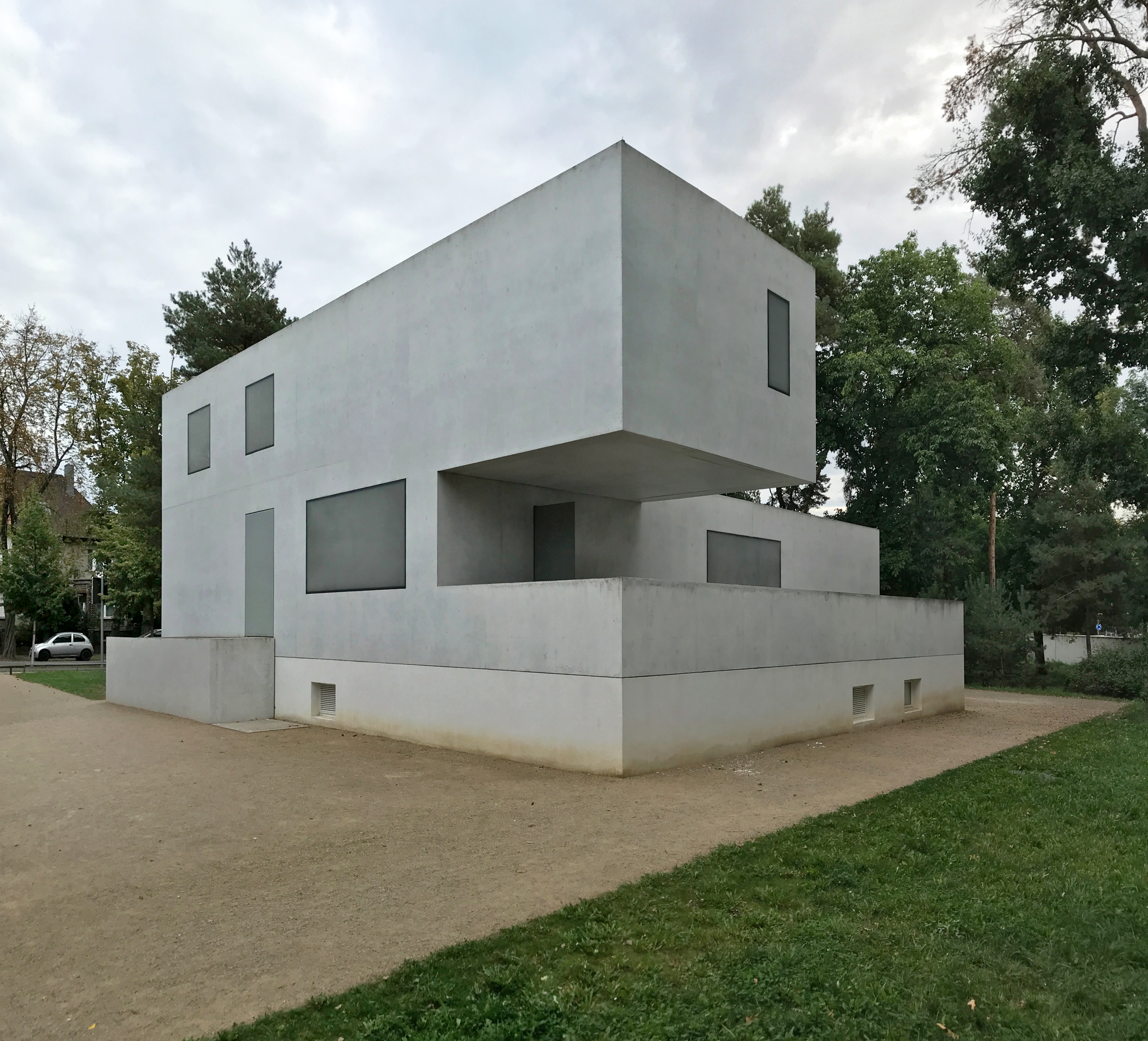
Modern reconstruction of Gropius's house in Dessau which was destroyed during World War II

Gropius left the Bauhaus in 1928 and moved to Berlin. Hannes Meyer took over the role of Bauhaus director. Gropius became a lecturer at the Marxist Workers' School, an educational institute founded and administered by the Communist Party of Germany. Other Bauhaus members lectured at the school, and even supplied it with furniture. His work was also part of the architecture event in the art competition at the 1932 Summer Olympics.

=== England (1934–1937) ===
The rise of Hitler in the 1930s would soon drive Gropius out of Germany. Before that, however, he accepted an invitation in early 1933 to compete for the design of the new Reichsbank building and submitted a detailed plan. He also designed furniture, cars, high-rise housing developments Siedlung and an unrealized Palace of the Soviets in Moscow.

Gropius was able to leave Nazi Germany in 1934 with the help of Maxwell Fry on the pretext of making a temporary visit to Italy for a film propaganda festival; he then fled to the United Kingdom to avoid the fascist powers of Europe. His association with "degenerate" modern art despised by the Nazis meant he was obliged to emigrate when commissions dried up. He lived and worked in the artists' community associated with Herbert Read in Hampstead, London, as part of the Isokon group.

=== United States (from 1937) ===
Gropius and his wife Ilse (or Ise) arrived in the United States in February 1937, while their twelve-year-old daughter, Ati, finished the school year in England. The house the Gropiuses built for themselves in 1938 in Lincoln, Massachusetts (now known as Gropius House), was influential in bringing International Modernism to the US, but Gropius disliked the term: "I made it a point to absorb into my own conception those features of the New England architectural tradition that I found still alive and adequate." In designing his house, Gropius used the approach developed at the Bauhaus. The Gropiuses believed their house could embody architectural qualities similar to those practiced today, such as simplicity, economy, and aesthetic beauty.

Helen Storrow, a banker's wife and philanthropist, became Gropius's benefactor when she invested a portion of her land and wealth for the architect's home. She was so satisfied with the result that she gave more land and financial support to four other professors, two of whom Gropius designed homes for. With the Bauhaus philosophy in mind, every aspect of the homes and their surrounding landscapes was planned for maximum efficiency and simplicity. Gropius's house received a huge response and was declared a National Landmark in 2000.

Gropius and his Bauhaus protégé Marcel Breuer both moved to Cambridge, Massachusetts, to teach at the Harvard Graduate School of Design (1937–1952) and collaborate on projects including The Alan I W Frank House in Pittsburgh and the company-town Aluminum City Terrace project in New Kensington, Pennsylvania, before their professional split. In 1938 he was appointed Chair of the Department of Architecture, a post he held until his retirement in 1952. Gropius also sat on the Massachusetts Institute of Technology (MIT) Visiting Committee at the end of his career. The well-known architect designed the Richards and Child residence halls on the Harvard campus that were built in the 1950s. In 1944, he became a naturalized citizen of the United States.

Gropius was one of several refugee German architects who provided information to confirm the typical construction of German houses to the RE8 research department set up by the British Air Ministry. This was used to improve the effectiveness of air raids on German cities by the Bomber Command of the Royal Air Force in World War II. The research was to discover the most efficient way of setting fire to houses with incendiary bombs during bombing raids. The findings were used in planning raids such as the bombing of Hamburg in July 1943.

=== The Architects Collaborative ===
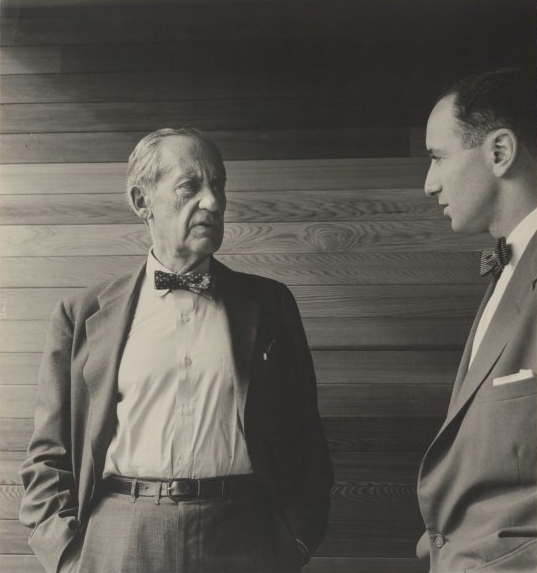
Gropius with Harry Seidler in Sydney, Australia, in 1954

In 1945, Gropius was asked by the young founding members of The Architects Collaborative (TAC) to join as their senior partner. TAC represented a manifestation of his lifelong belief in the significance of teamwork, which he had already successfully introduced at the Bauhaus. Based in Cambridge, the original TAC partners included Norman C. Fletcher, Jean B. Fletcher, John C. Harkness, Sarah P. Harkness, Robert S. MacMillan, Louis A. MacMillen, and Benjamin C. Thompson. Among TAC's earliest works were two residential housing developments in Lexington, Massachusetts: Six Moon Hill and Five Fields. Each incorporated contemporary design ideas, reasonable cost, and practical thinking about how to support community life. Another early TAC work is the Graduate Center of Harvard University in Cambridge (1949/50). TAC would become one of the most well-known and respected architectural firms in the world before it closed its doors amidst financial problems in 1995.

In 1967, Gropius was elected into the National Academy of Design as an Associate member and became a full Academician in 1968.

== Death ==
Gropius died on 5 July 1969, in Boston, Massachusetts, aged 86. He had been diagnosed with inflammation of the glands, and was admitted to hospital on 7 June. After a successful operation on 15 June, there was hope of a full recovery. Gropius described himself as a "tough old bird", and continued to make progress for about a week. However, his lungs became congested and could not supply proper amounts of oxygen to the blood and brain. He lost consciousness, and died in his sleep.

== Legacy ==
Today, Gropius is remembered not only by his various buildings but also by the district of Gropiusstadt in Berlin. In the early 1990s, a series of books entitled The Walter Gropius Archive was published covering his entire architectural career. The CD audiobook Bauhaus Reviewed 1919–33 includes a lengthy English Language interview with Gropius.

Upon his death his widow, Ise Gropius, arranged to have his collection of papers divided into early and late papers. Both parts were photographed with funds provided by the Thyssen Foundation. The late papers, relating to Gropius's career after 1937, and the photos of the early ones, then went to the Houghton Library at Harvard University; the early papers and photos of the late papers went to the Bauhaus Archiv, then in Darmstadt, since reestablished in Berlin. Mrs. Gropius also deeded the Gropius House in Lincoln to Historic New England in 1980, now a house museum. The Gropius House was added to the National Register of Historic Places in 1988 and is now available to the public for tours.

Bauhaus Center Tel Aviv in the White City recognizes the greatest concentration of Bauhaus buildings in the world.

== Honours and recognition ==
In 1953 Gropius received an honorary Doctor of Architecture degree by the North Carolina State University. In 1954 he received an honorary Doctor of Science (Honoris Causa) from the Vice-Chancellor, Professor SH Roberts at the University of Sydney. In 1959, Gropius was awarded the AIA Gold Medal.

In 1996, the Bauhaus Building and the Master Houses were added to list of UNESCO World Heritage Sites.

On 17 May 2008, Google Doodle commemorated Walter Gropius's 125th birthday.

== Selected buildings ==
- 1906 granary in Jankowo, Western Pomerania, Poland
- 1910–1911 the Fagus Factory, Alfeld an der Leine, Germany
- 1914 Office and Factory Buildings at the Werkbund Exhibition, 1914, Cologne, Germany
- 1921 Sommerfeld House, Berlin, Germany designed for Adolf Sommerfeld
- 1922 competition entry for the Chicago Tribune Tower competition
- 1925–1932 Bauhaus School and Meisterhäuser (houses for senior staff), Dessau, Germany
- 1926–1928 Törten housing estate in Dessau.
- 1927–1929 Dessau Employment Office (Arbeitsamt).
- 1935–1936 Denham Film Studios, Uxbridge, England (with Maxwell Fry)
- 1936 Village College, Impington, Cambridgeshire, England
- 1936 66 Old Church Street, Chelsea, London, England
- 1937 The Gropius House, Lincoln, Massachusetts, US
- 1939 Waldenmark, Wrightstown Township, Pennsylvania (with Marcel Breuer)
- 1939–1940 The Alan I W Frank House, Pittsburgh, Pennsylvania (with Marcel Breuer)
- 1942–1944 Aluminum City Terrace housing project, New Kensington, Pennsylvania, US
- 1945–1959 Michael Reese Hospital, Chicago, Illinois, US – Master planned 37-acre (150,000 m^{2}) site and led the design for at least 8 of the approx. 28 buildings.
- 1949–1950 Harvard Graduate Center, Cambridge, Massachusetts, US (The Architects' Collaborative)
- 1957–1960 University of Baghdad, Baghdad, Iraq
- 1963–1966 John F. Kennedy Federal Office Building, Boston, Massachusetts, US
- 1948 Peter Thacher Junior High School,
- 1957–1959 Dr. and Mrs. Carl Murchison House, Provincetown, Massachusetts, US (The Architects' Collaborative)
- 1958–1963 Pan Am Building (now the Metlife Building), New York, with Pietro Belluschi and project architects Emery Roth & Sons
- 1957 Interbau Apartment blocks, Hansaviertel (Walter-Gropius-Haus) Berlin, Germany, with The Architects' Collaborative and Wils Ebert
- 1960 Temple Oheb Shalom (Baltimore, Maryland)
- 1960 the Gropiusstadt building complex, Berlin, Germany
- 1961 The award-winning Wayland High School, Wayland, Massachusetts, US (demolished 2012)
- 1959–1961 Embassy of the United States, Athens, Greece (The Architects' Collaborative and consulting architect Pericles A. Sakellarios)
- 1968 Glass Cathedral, Thomas Glassworks, Amberg
- 1967–1969 Tower East, Shaker Heights, Ohio, was Gropius's last major project.
- 1968–1970 Huntington Museum of Art, Huntington, West Virginia, US. Original building expanded with Gropius addition with little alteration to the original structure. Only American art museum to be brought to completion using a Gropius design.
- 1973–1980 Porto Carras, at Chalkidiki, Greece, was built posthumously from Gropius designs, it is one of the largest holiday resorts in Europe.

NB: The building in Niederkirchnerstraße, Berlin known as the Gropius-Bau is named for Gropius's great-uncle, Martin Gropius, and is not associated with the Bauhaus.

=== Gallery ===
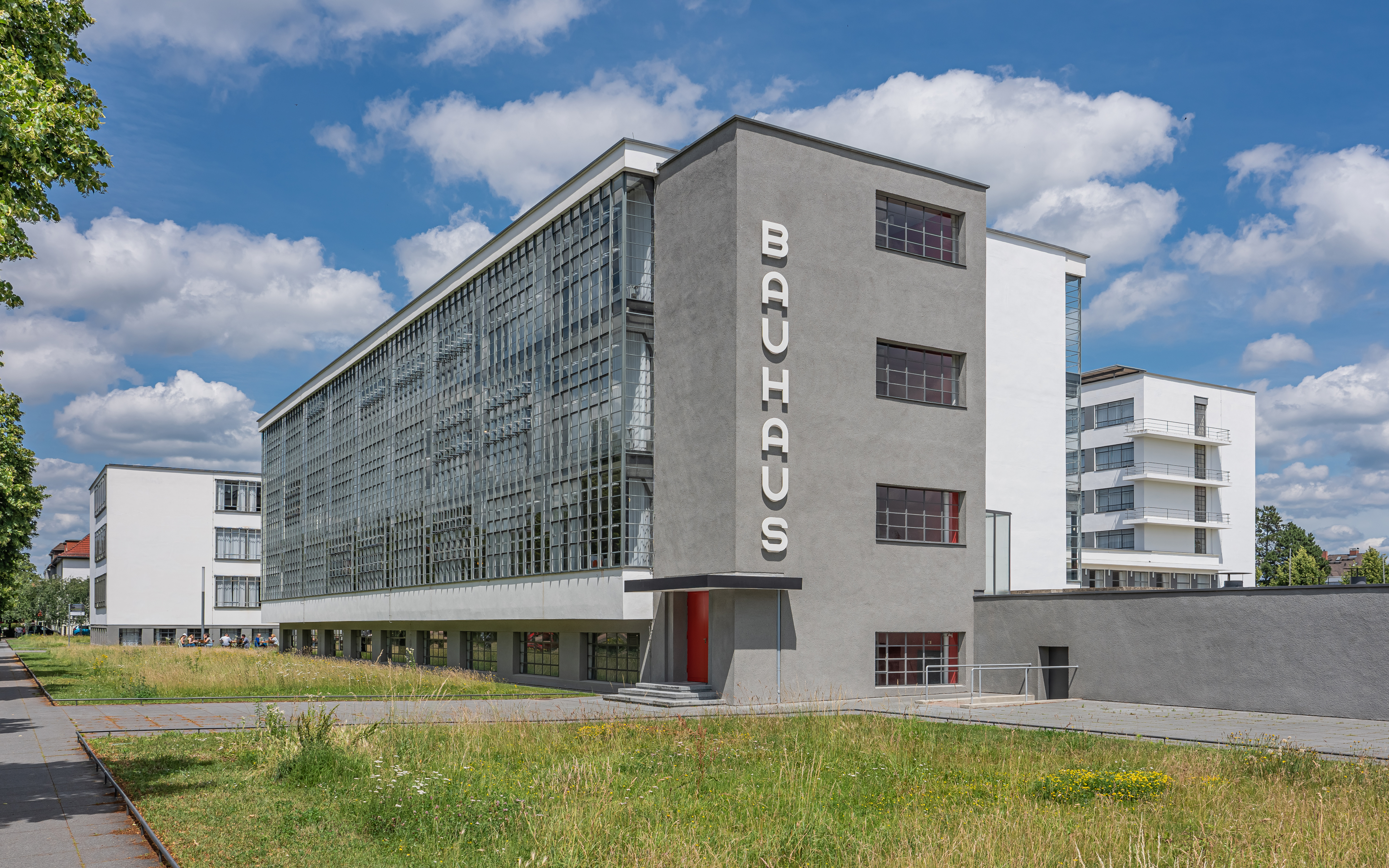
Bauhaus Dessau building, built 1925–1926

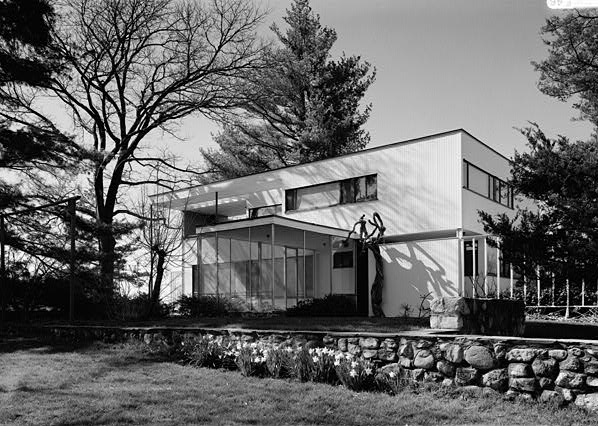
Gropius House (1938) in Lincoln, Massachusetts

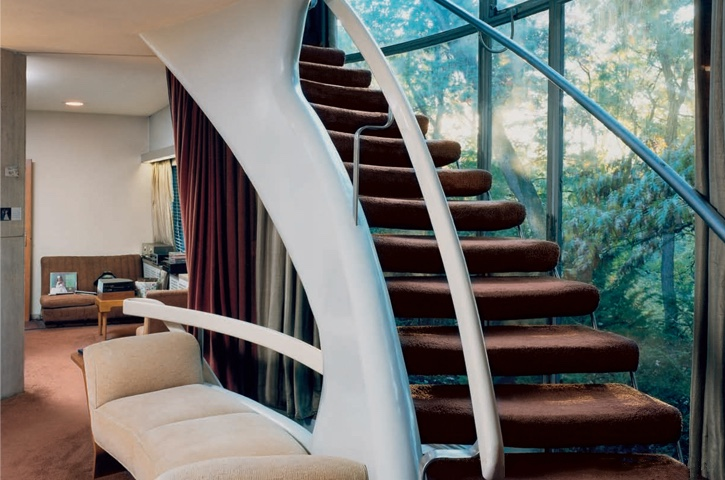
The Alan I W Frank House

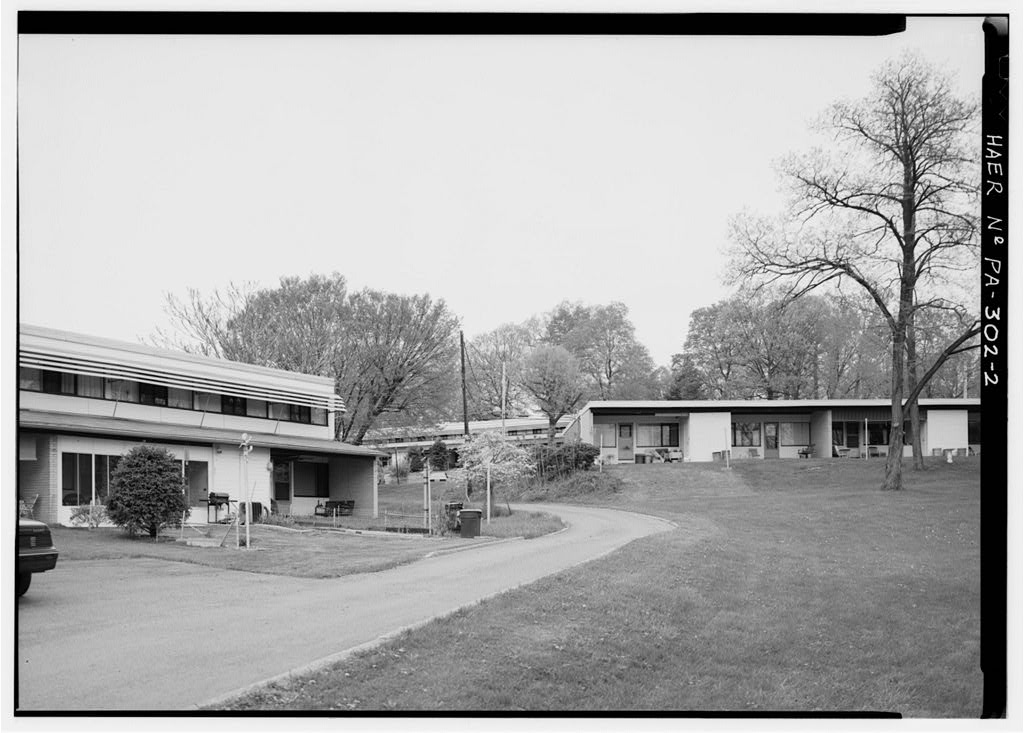
Aluminum City Terrace (1944)

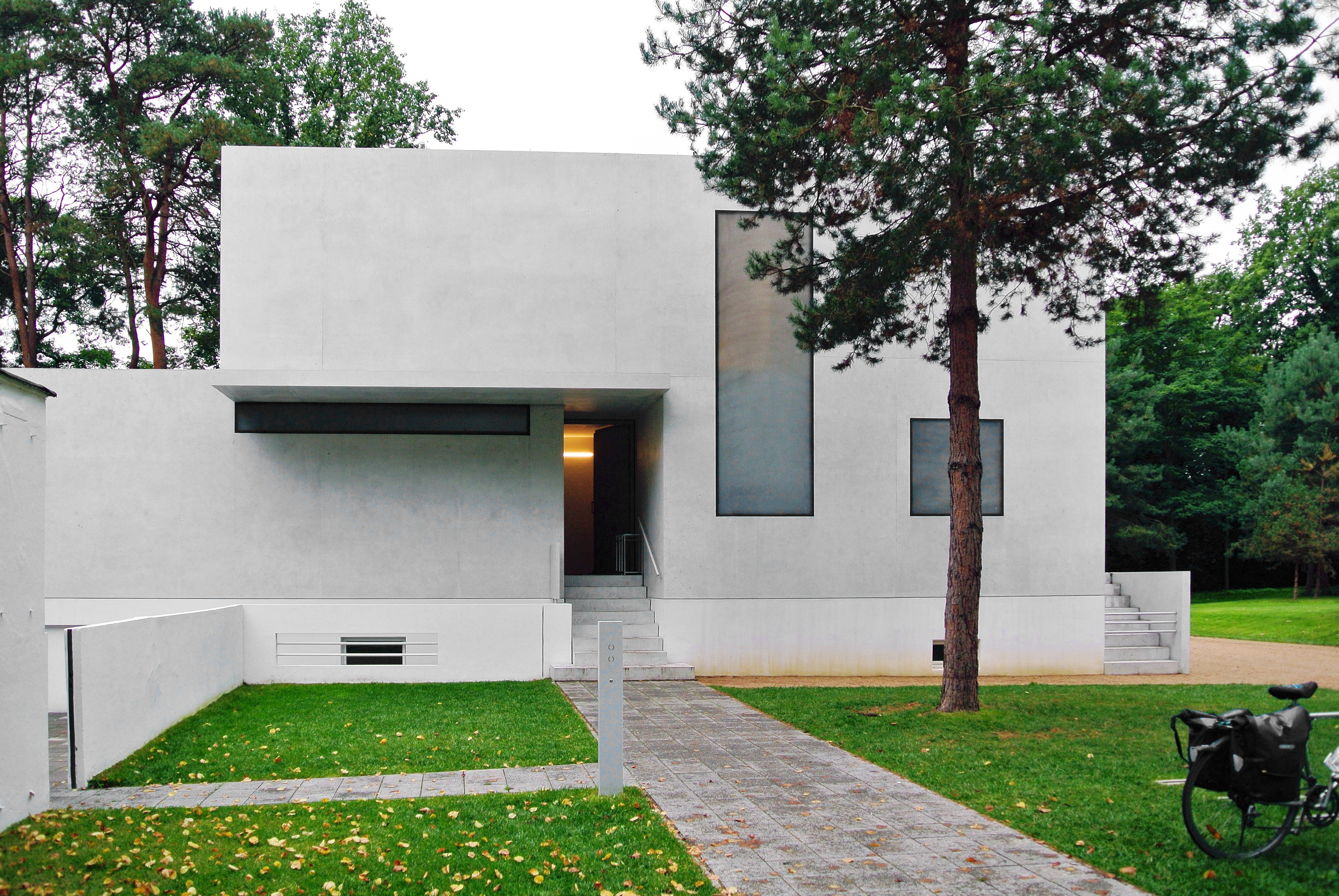
Front view of the modern reconstruction of Gropius's house in Dessau (1925–1926). It was destroyed during World War II. This reconstruction (2014) was not built as an exact replica of the original house.

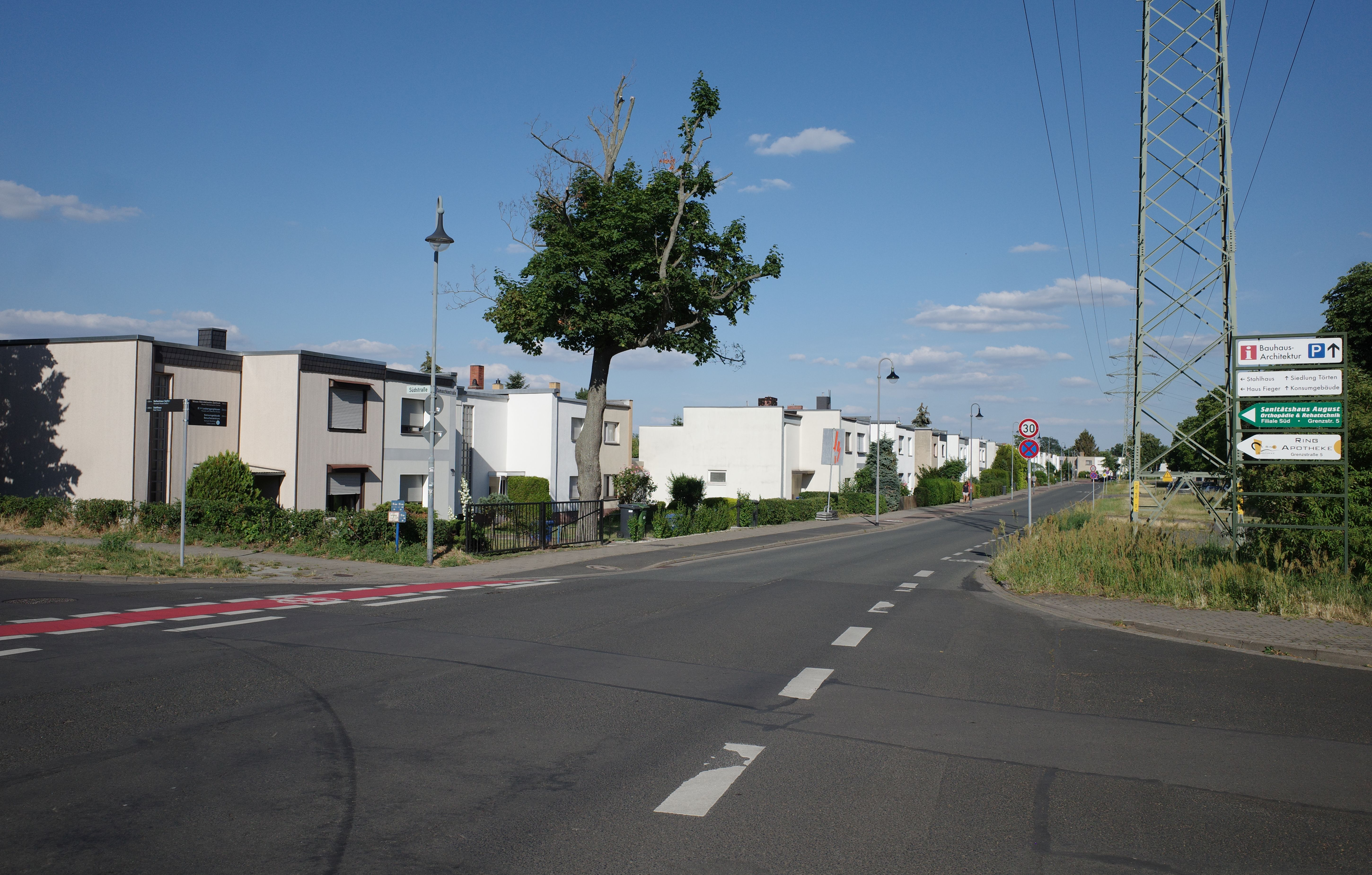
Part of the Törten Housing Estate (Siedlung Dessau-Törten) designed by Gropius (1926–1928)

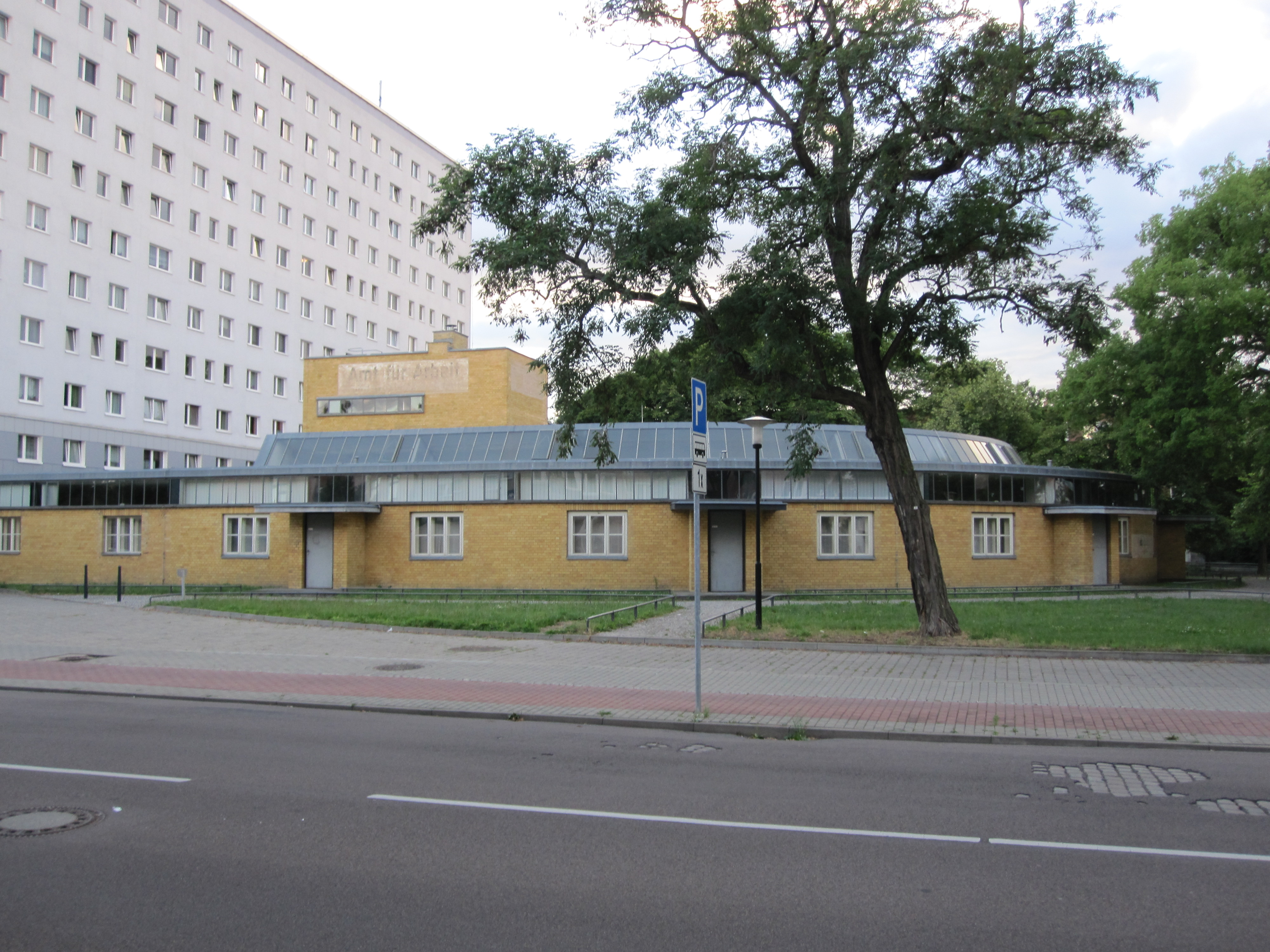
Dessau Employment Office (Arbeitsamt) designed by Gropius in 1927 and built between 1928 and 1929

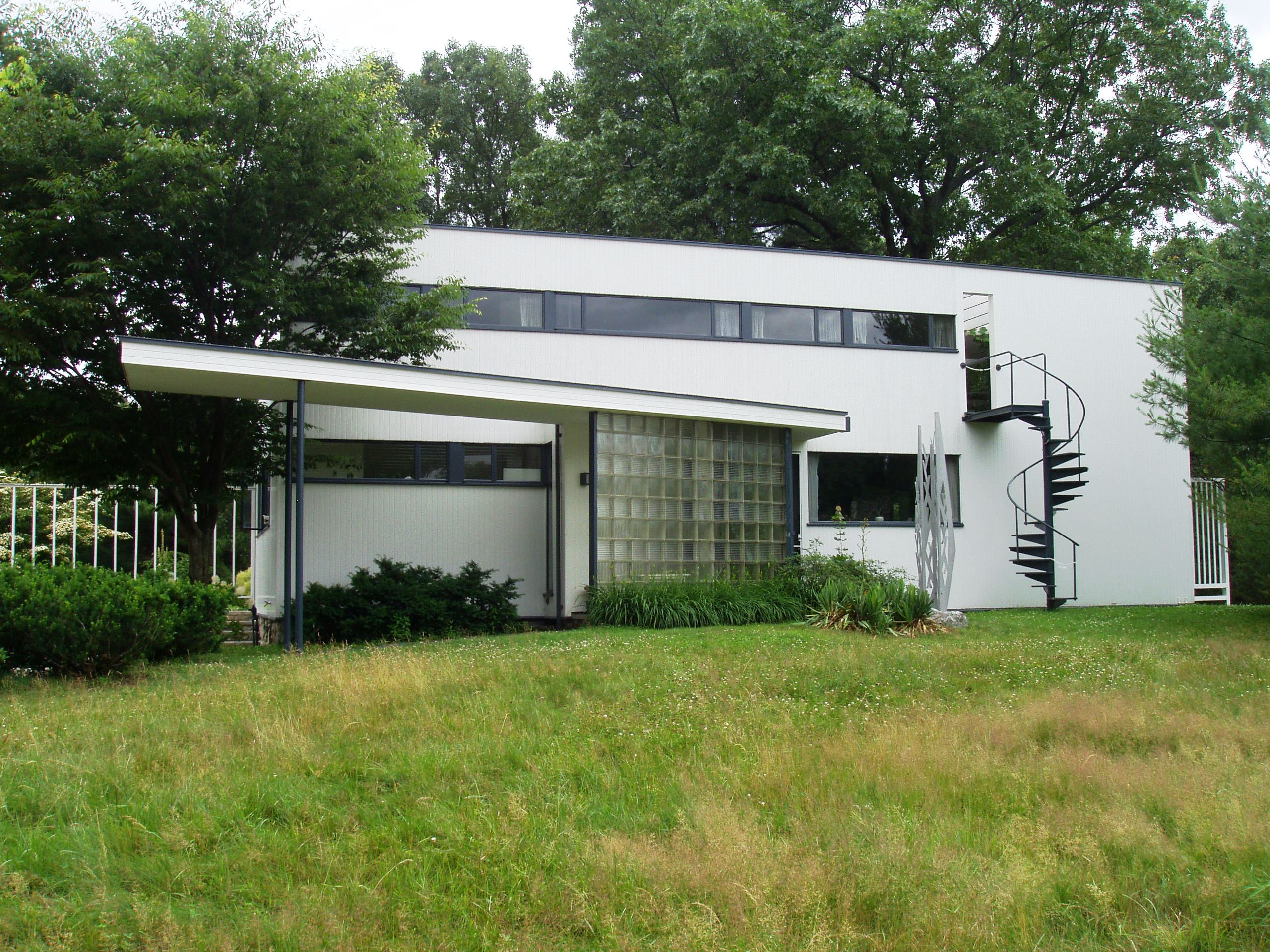
The Gropius House (1938) in Lincoln Massachusetts

== See also ==
- The Back Bay Center, 1953 Boston proposed development

== Bibliography ==
- Isaacs, Reginald (1991). Walter Gropius: An illustrated Biography of the Creator of the Bauhaus (First English-language ed.). Berlin: Bulfinch Press. ISBN 978-0-8212-1753-5.
