= The Artist of the Beautiful =

- Short story by Nathaniel Hawthorne
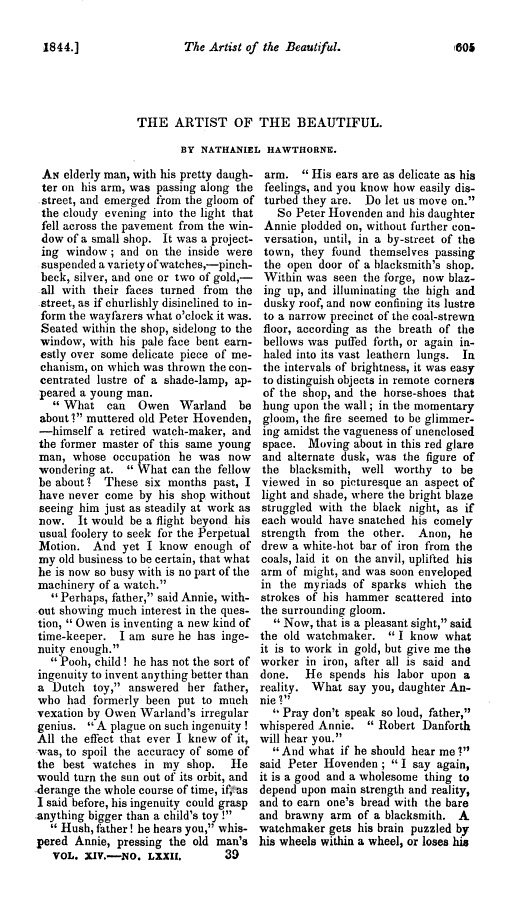
- Country: United States
- Language: English
- Genres: Short story, science fiction

Publication
- Published in: The United States Magazine and Democratic Review
- Media type: Print
- Publication date: June 1844

"The Artist of the Beautiful" is a short story by the American writer, Nathaniel Hawthorne. The story was first published in 1844 and was included two years later in the collection Mosses from an Old Manse published by Wiley & Putnam.

== Summary ==
"The Artist of the Beautiful" follows Owen Warland as he works on an unknown project. The story begins with Peter Hovenden, a retired watchmaker and Owen's former master, walking by with his daughter Annie. Peter scoffs at Owen for working on something other than a watch, and tells his daughter that the more practical work of the blacksmith Robert Danforth is more admirable. Working with such strength, Peter believes, "takes the nonsense out of a man." Owen has overheard this conversation and wonders if Annie agrees with her father.

Robert presents Owen with a tiny anvil he had requested and the two briefly discuss the differences between practical work and more ambitious work. Resuming his project, Owen finds himself affected by Robert's practical-mindedness and unintentionally ruins his work. In despair, Owen puts the project aside and begins to focus on his watchmaking, becoming well-respected in town. In the midst of this success, Peter returns to the shop and sees that Owen has resumed work on his secret invention. He threatens to destroy it, which he believes will be helping him. Owen shouts at him and curses the "coarse world" that does not appreciate his work. Months later, Annie visits and asks him to repair a thimble of hers. Owen, for a moment, thinks she is the one person who might understand his work, but changes his mind when she accidentally breaks his small machine.

Owen breaks from society for a time and finds his nourishment in nature and in chasing butterflies. Peter returns to invite him to a celebration for the engagement of his daughter to Robert Danforth. Owen secretly loves Annie and is despondent for a time but, once his spirits revive, he returns to his project with vigor. Years pass before he visits Robert and Annie at their home. He offers his invention to Annie as a late wedding gift and instructs her to open an extravagantly decorated box. Inside is a small butterfly which lands on her finger. She is unsure if it is real or a machine. Her child reaches for the butterfly but he has inherited his father's strength and his grandfather's skepticism and the butterfly is crushed in his small hands. Owen is not upset because he had already achieved his goal as the artist of the beautiful; The butterfly itself was only the physical manifestation of that symbol.

== Publication history ==
"The Artist of the Beautiful" was first published in The United States Magazine and Democratic Review in its June 1844 issue before being included in the collection Mosses from an Old Manse in 1846. Margaret Fuller, in the June 22, 1846, edition of the New York Daily Tribune, stated that the story "presents in a form that is, indeed, beautiful, the opposite view as to what are the substantial realities of life".

== Analysis ==
Hawthorne biographer Brenda Wineapple compares "The Artist of the Beautiful" with "Alice Doane's Appeal" in that both feature a creator or artist character whose creation is unappreciated by others. Critics generally include the story, along with "The Birth-Mark" and "Drowne's Wooden Image", as Hawthorne's most significant explorations of the nature of art and its creation. In fact, the story combines the creation of art with science, making it an early form of science fiction; it is considered to be the first short story to feature a robotic insect.

Hawthorne also ambiguously plays with the concept of the Cult of Domesticity in the story. Owen Warland is removed from traditional domestic happiness, for example, but it is unclear if Hawthorne himself even acknowledges this form of fulfillment. Annie mentions that she admires her child more than she admires the butterfly, but the narrative voice admits that such admiration is "with good reason", allowing the reader to question Hawthorne's admiration of his own character's invention.
