= Egotism; or, The Bosom-Serpent =

- Short story by Nathaniel Hawthorne
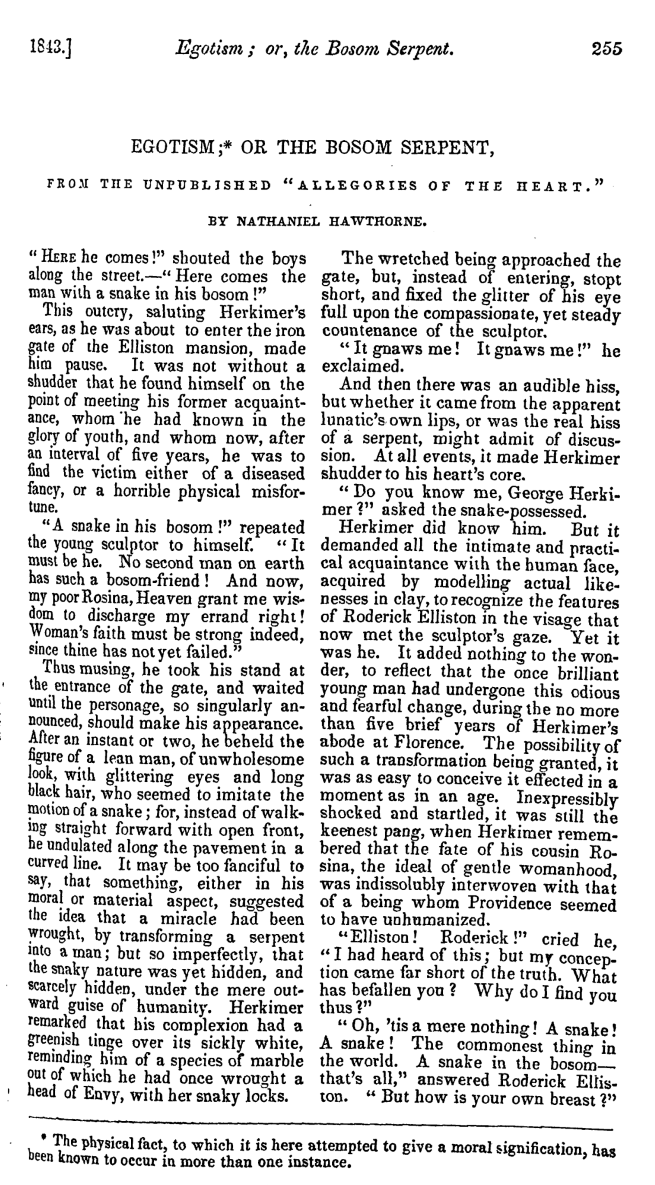
- Country: United States
- Language: English
- Genre: Short story

Publication
- Published in: The United States Magazine and Democratic Review (March 1843); Mosses from an Old Manse (Wiley & Putnam, 1846)
- Publication type: Periodical; Short story collection
- Media type: Print

"Egotism; or, The Bosom-Serpent" is a short story by Nathaniel Hawthorne published in 1843 in The United States Magazine and Democratic Review in New York.

== Plot synopsis ==
George Herkimer visits his old acquaintance, Roderick Elliston, who is rumored to have a snake residing in his bosom. Herkimer says he brings Elliston a message from Elliston's wife Rosina, but Elliston retreats into his house before receiving it.

Elliston and Rosina had separated four years earlier. Soon, people noticed a green tint to his skin and often heard a hissing sound coming from his bosom. Elliston sought the attention of others and pointed out the snakes they possessed within their own bosoms. His relatives placed him in an asylum, but his doctors decided his affliction did not demand confinement.

After learning this, Herkimer returns to Elliston, who says his self-contemplation has nurtured the serpent. Rosina appears and suggests that he "forget [himself] in the idea of another". They touch and Roderick is healed.

== Composition and publication history ==
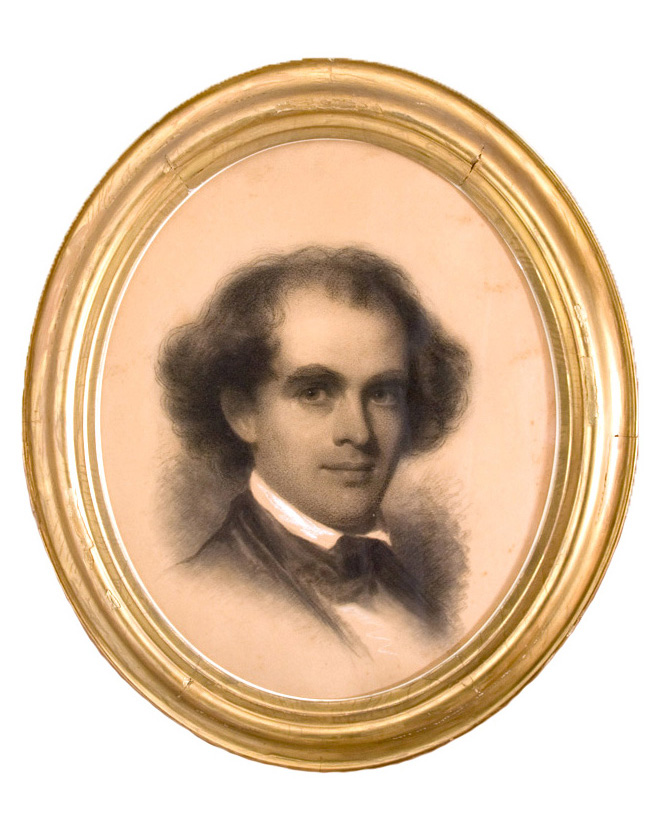
Hawthorne in 1846

In the 1840s, Hawthorne was planning a project of interrelated stories to be collected under the banner Allegories of the Heart; instead, several of those stories were published in the Democratic Review, including "Egotism; or, The Bosom-Serpent" in the March 1843 issue. It was republished in The Pathfinder that same month and later appeared in Mosses from an Old Manse, a collection of short stories by Hawthorne published in 1846. Another tale, "The Christmas Banquet", is a sequel which again features the character of Roderick; both stories also carried a subtitle indicating they were part of the unpublished Allegories of the Heart.

== Analysis ==
In 1850, Herman Melville referred to "Egotism; or, The Bosom-Serpent" as a tale deserving of "curious and elaborate analysis, touching the conjectural parts of the mind that produced them." Though author Henry James in 1879 said the story was "stiff and mechanical, slightly incongruous", it influenced his tale "The Jolly Corner". Scholar Erich S. Rupprecht insisted it was one of Hawthorne's lesser works, claiming the "symbolic burden of the story clearly overwhelms the literal" and that the story "never manages to achieve much power or emotional resonance". Hawthorne himself seemingly later questioned his own allegorical works, as he wrote to publisher James T. Fields in 1854: "Upon my honor, I am not quite sure that I entirely comprehend my own meaning in some of these blasted allegories."

20th century literary critic Frederick Crews noted that the story, similar to other Hawthorne tales like "The Birth-Mark", is one of many in which a character avoids or fears marriage or features an inexplicably absent female lover/wife. Hawthorne biographer Brenda Wineapple calls the character of Roderick Elliston "Poe-like". Further, like Roger Chillingworth in The Scarlet Letter, that character has a poisoned human nature, distant from human affection. Though the snake in the bosom is presented both literally and symbolically, critic Harry Levin notes that it is unclear if the snake is "a physical ailment, a mental delusion, or a token of demonic possession." Elliston is only "cured" when he is able to "Forget yourself in the idea of another." Hawthorne had similarly done the same when he married Sophia Peabody in 1842.
