= The Celestial Railroad =

Short story by Nathaniel Hawthorne

"The Celestial Railroad", 1843, is a short story by American author Nathaniel Hawthorne. In the allegorical tale, Hawthorne adopts the style and content of the seventeenth-century allegory The Pilgrim's Progress by John Bunyan. Whereas Bunyan's tale portrays a Christian's spiritual "journey" through life, Hawthorne's satirizes many contemporary religious practices and philosophies, including transcendentalism.

== Plot ==
In this story, told in the first person, the narrator undertakes a journey from the city of Destruction to the Celestial City. The journey, taken by the narrator due to curiosity and free time, can now be made by train instead of on foot. He immediately meets a fellow traveler, Mr. Smooth-it-away, a native of Destruction, who seems to know all about the Celestial City, despite having never been there before. Their train passes by several landmarks, including the Slough of Despond, the House of the Interpreter, the Palace Beautiful, and the Valley of the Shadow of Death. The train does not stop at these locations, however.

At the end of their journey, they exit the train and prepare to board a ferry-boat that will cross the river to the Celestial City. Mr. Smooth-it-away, however, does not accompany the narrator, who seems surprised. Mr. Smooth-it-away admits that he never intended to go to the Celestial City and only joined the narrator for his "pleasant company". Then, laughing, smoke comes out of his mouth and nostrils and flames dart out of his eyes as he reveals his true form as an "impudent fiend". The narrator then wakes up and realizes his journey has been a dream.

== Composition and publication history ==
"The Celestial Railroad" was written during a prolific period in Hawthorne's life, one which biographer James R. Mellow called the happiest years of his life, immediately following his marriage to Sophia Peabody Hawthorne and moving into The Old Manse in Concord, Massachusetts. The story was written for The United States Magazine and Democratic Review in 1843, along with several other stories that year, including "The New Adam and Eve", "Egotism; or, The Bosom-Serpent", "Fire-Worship", and more. It was first published in the May 1843 issue of The Democratic Review before being collected in Mosses from an Old Manse in 1846.

== Analysis ==
"The Celestial Railroad" expresses Hawthorne's sardonic view of religious movements of his day. He may have been directly attacking some of the newer ideas popular at the time, including Unitarianism and transcendentalism, but according to some educators, several of his comments also indicate his dissatisfaction with Bunyan's religiously exclusive theology.

In addition to this underlying view, however, he states "we were rushing by the place where Christian's burden fell from his shoulders at the sight of the Cross... for our burdens were rich in many things esteemed precious throughout the world." The story ends with the traveler's relief that what he'd seen was just a dream and an element of hope that is rare in Hawthorne's romantic era literature.

As a satire, the story aims mostly at the transcendentalists and the apparent moral complacency of their teachings. Hawthorne particularly takes issue with their inability to be understood; a character in the story called Giant Transcendentalist is described as "a heap of fog and duskiness". Reflecting Hawthorne's own distrust of Emerson's idealism, the characters in the story are confused by the Giant Transcendentalist as he "shouted after us, but in so strange a phraseology that we knew not what he meant, nor whether to be encouraged or affrighted". Hawthorne also uses the story to satirize and criticize modern business, public relations types, aggressive promoters, and the railroad itself.

Hawthorne's story makes several references to the original The Pilgrim's Progress. Evangelist, who first directs Christian on his journey, is updated to a worker at the train station's ticket office. Apollyon, leader of the city of Destruction who fights a battle with Christian in the Valley of Humiliation, has become chief conductor.

== Response ==
Mellow referred to "The Celestial Railroad" as "what must be considered his most popular and enduring allegorical fable". Hawthorne seemed pleased to have offended some of the clergy he knew personally when, not long after the story was published, he wrote to Sophia Peabody that an acquaintance of his treated him coldly: "I suspect the Celestial Rail-road must have given him a pique; and if so, I shall feel as if Providence had sufficiently rewarded me for that pious labor". Ralph Waldo Emerson wrote privately to Henry David Thoreau that the story "has a serene strength which one cannot afford not to praise,—in this low life". Herman Melville, re-reading Hawthorne's writings after his death, referred to a scene in "The Celestial Railroad" where citizens in Vanity Fair are ambivalent about their neighbors' deaths, all except the narrator: "Nothing can be finer than this".

The American composer Charles Ives based the second movement of his Fourth Symphony on Hawthorne's story, expanding on his earlier piece for solo piano, also entitled The Celestial Railroad.

The title of The True and Only Heaven, a book by Christopher Lasch, is taken from the story.
