= Hawthorne and His Mosses =

1850 essay and critical review by Herman Melville

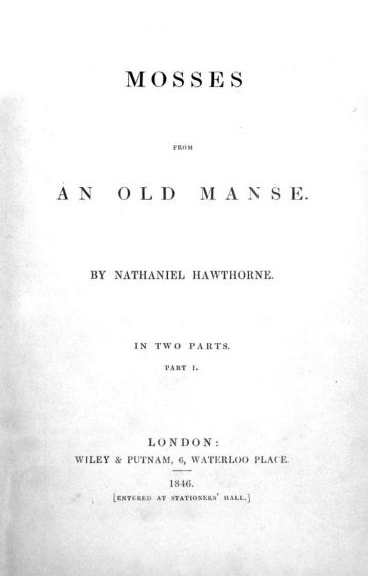
Title page of Mosses from an Old Manse, the subject of Melville's review

"Hawthorne and His Mosses" (1850) is an essay and critical review by Herman Melville of the short story collection Mosses from an Old Manse written by Nathaniel Hawthorne in 1846. Published pseudonymously by "a Virginian spending July in Vermont", it appeared in The Literary World magazine in two issues: August 17 and August 24, 1850. It has been called the "most famous literary manifesto of the American nineteenth century."

Melville's call in “Mosses” for a unique American literature was early expression of the mid-nineteenth century Young America movement. Yet it was not reprinted until 1922, after the start of the Melville Revival, and was not widely recognized for several decades.

== Background ==
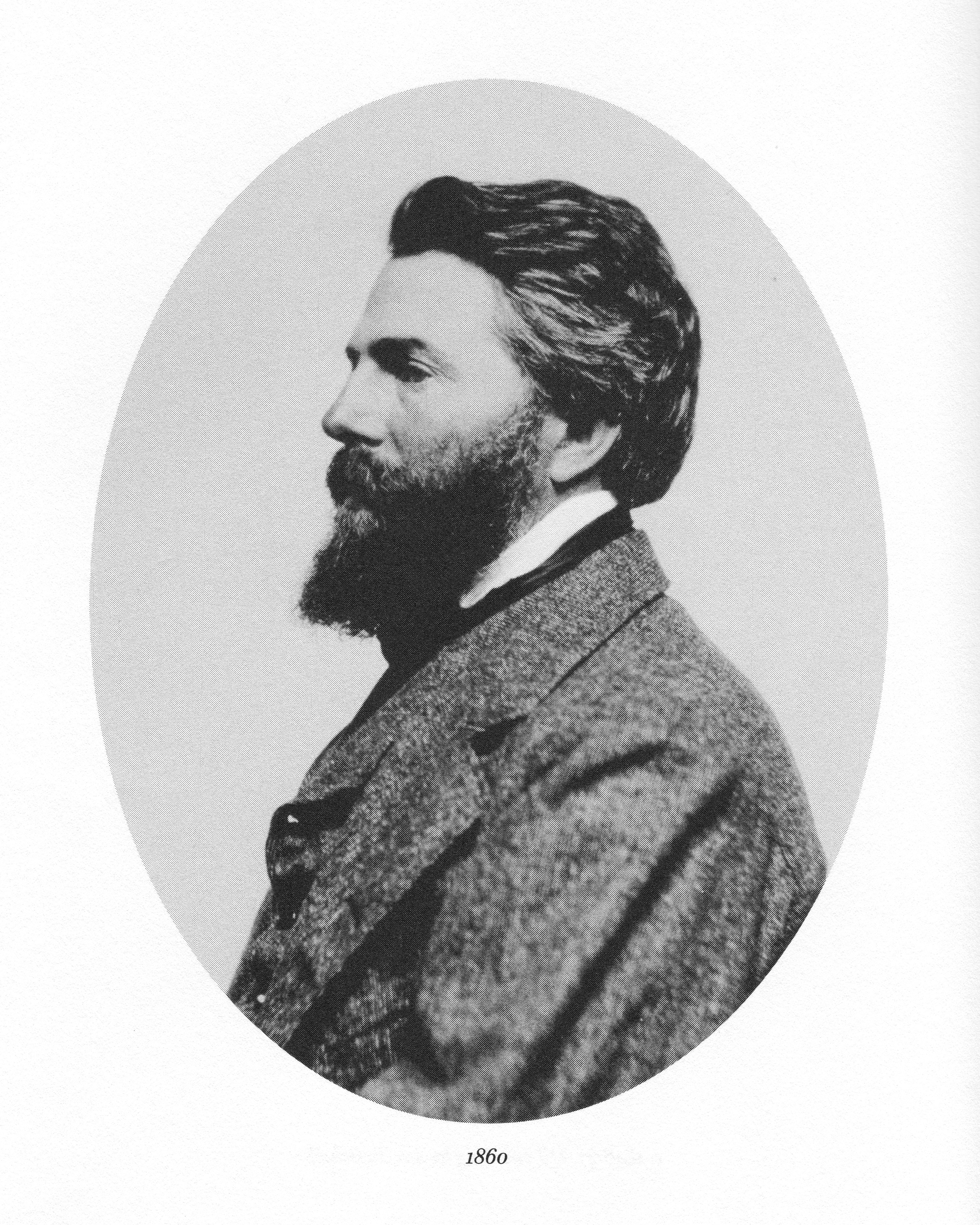
Melville

Melville met the author Nathaniel Hawthorne at a picnic and an ensuing hike up Monument Mountain in the Berkshires of western Massachusetts on August 5, 1850. Also among the hikers were James T. Fields, Cornelius Mathews, and Oliver Wendell Holmes Sr. Melville and Hawthorne established an immediate and intense connection. As a local journalist would later write: "the two were compelled to take shelter in a narrow recess of the rocks... Two hours of enforced intercourse settled the matter. They learned so much of each other's character, and found that they held so much of thought, feeling and opinion in common, that the most intimate friendship for the future was inevitable."

Melville had been given a copy of Hawthorne's Mosses from an Old Manse but he had not yet read it, though the book had been published four years earlier. Another of the hikers, Evert Augustus Duyckinck, publisher of Hawthorne and friend of Melville, urged Melville to do a review for his Literary World, even offering to delay his departure for New York City until the manuscript was ready. Before learning the identity of the then pseudonymous author, Hawthorne's wife Sophia declared the essay to be written by "the first person who has ever, in print apprehended Mr. Hawthorne." When she discovered it was Melville, she called him "an invaluable person, full of daring & questions, & with all momentous considerations afloat in the crucible of his mind."

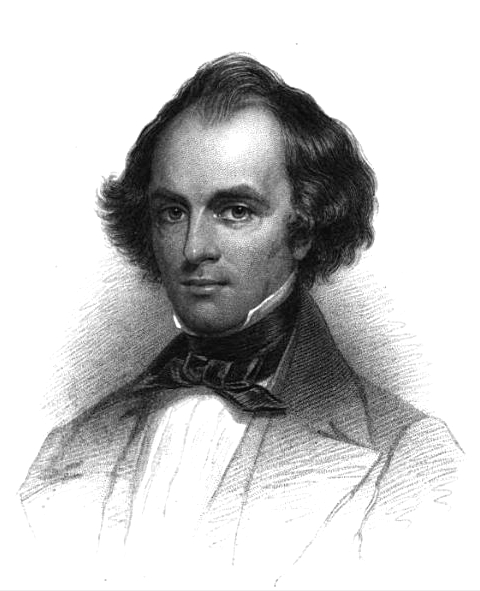
Hawthorne

== Impact ==
Melville, who took time off from writing Moby-Dick to compose the review, expressed gratitude to Hawthorne for "dropping germinous seeds in my soul." The review drew attention to his "great power of blackness" that "derives its force from its appeals to that Calvinistic sense of Innate Depravity and Original Sin, from whose visitations, in some shape or other, no deeply thinking mind is always and wholly free." Emboldened by Hawthorne's example he started to scrutinize what he had written so far and began a major expansion and revision of his work in progress and soon-to-be masterpiece. Scholar David Dowling suggests that Melville intended the essay to redefine the expectations of readers of American prose to prepare them for Moby-Dick. In reforming previous literary biases, he particularly wanted to encourage an embracing of the dark side of writing, hoping that his own book would be received well.

The critic Walter Bezanson finds the essay "so deeply related to Melville's imaginative and intellectual world while writing Moby-Dick" that it could be regarded as a virtual preface and should be "everybody's prime piece of contextual reading".

== Versions of the text ==
The New York Public Library's collection of the Duyckink Family Papers retains Melville's fair-copy, that is, the handwritten version made by his wife, Elizabeth, that was submitted to Literary World. Melville and the publisher, Evert A. Duyckink, made more than 100 corrections and added punctuation for the significantly revised version that was printed. The Northwestern-Newberry edition used the unrevised fair-copy with only Melville's own corrections, reasoning that Duyckinck pressured Melville into making changes that appeared in print and that the fair-copy was closer to the author's intentions. Some anthologies use the Northwestern-Newberry version, others the Literary World version.

== Sources ==
- Bryant, John (nd). "Versions Of "Hawthorne And His Mosses". Melville Electronic Library.
- Delbanco, Andrew (2005). Melville, His World and Work. Alfred A. Knopf. ISBN 0-375-40314-0.
- Melville, Herman (August 1850), "Hawthorne and His Mosses", Literary World Reprinted in The Piazza Tales and Other Prose Pieces, 1839–1860, edited by Harrison Hayford, Alma A. MacDougall, and G. Thomas Tanselle. Northwestern-Newberry Edition of the Writings of Herman Melville, vol. 9. Evanston, Ill.: Northwestern University Press, 1987.
- Wikisource Hawthorne and his Mosses.
- Parker, Hershel (1996). "36: Hawthorne and His Mosses". Herman Melville: A Biography, Volume 1, 1819-1851. Johns Hopkins University Press. ISBN 0-8018-5428-8.
- Wineapple, Brenda (2004). Hawthorne: A Life. New York: Random House. ISBN 978-0-8129-7291-7.
- Wineapple, Brenda (2021). "Hawthorne and His Mosses". American History Through Literature 1820-1870. Encyclopedia.com.
