= P.'s Correspondence =

Sketch by Nathaniel Hawthorne

"P.'s Correspondence" is an 1845 sketch by the 19th century American writer Nathaniel Hawthorne.

"P.'s Correspondence" is presented as an epistolary sketch featuring a lengthy letter dated February 29, 1845, and addressed to an unnamed friend who is publishing it. P. has possibly lost his sanity and, despite not leaving his room, has met a wide variety of famous 19th century figures whom he describes. Some of the people he meets were already dead and P. confuses past and present. Among those he encounters in his imagination or claims friendship with are Lord Byron, Napoleon, John Greenleaf Whittier, Henry Wadsworth Longfellow, Charles Brockden Brown, and Joel Barlow.

The sketch was first published in The United States Magazine and Democratic Review in April 1845 before being collected with other Hawthorne stories in Mosses from an Old Manse in 1846.
