= Goodman (title) =

Archaic English form of address

Goodman was once a polite term of address, used where Mister (Mr.) would be used today. A man addressed by this title was, however, of a lesser social rank than a man addressed as Mister. Compare Goodwife.

The terms were used in England and Puritan New England. They are perhaps best known today as the forms of address used in Arthur Miller's historical fiction The Crucible, and in Nathaniel Hawthorne's short story "Young Goodman Brown".

In his 1577 work, Description of England, William Harrison wrote:

"The third and last sort is named the yeomanry, of whom and their sequel, the labourers and artificers, I have said somewhat even now. Whereto I add that they may not be called masters and gentlemen, but goodmen, as Goodman Smith, Goodman Coot, Goodman Cornell, Goodman Mascall, Goodman Cockswet, etc.: and in matters of law these and the like are called thus, Giles Jewd, yeoman; Edward Mountford, yeoman; James Cocke, yeoman; Harry Butcher, yeoman, etc.; by which addition they are exempt from the vulgar and common sorts. Cato calleth them 'Aratores et optimos cives rei publicæ,' of whom also you may read more in the book of commonwealth which Sir Thomas Smith some time penned of this land."
