= The Yankee =

1820s American literary magazine edited by John Neal

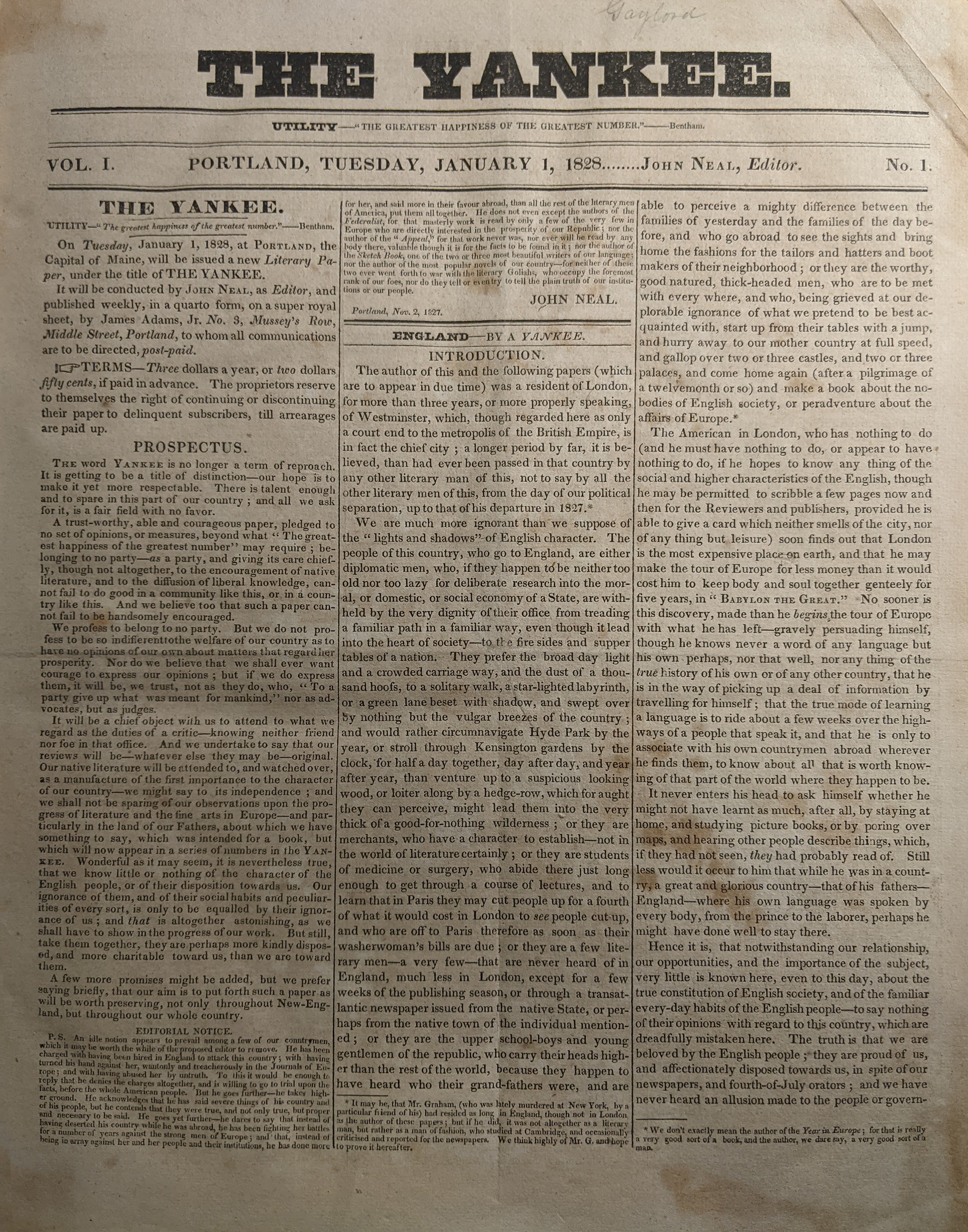
- First page of the first issue: January 1, 1828
- Editor: John Neal
- Categories: Literature, gymnastics, New England, England, art, theater, politics, utilitarianism, women's rights
- Frequency: Weekly (January 1, 1828 – July 3, 1829); Monthly (July–December 1829)
- Founder: John Neal
- First issue: January 1, 1828
- Final issue: December 1829
- Based in: Portland, Maine, US

The Yankee (later retitled The Yankee and Boston Literary Gazette) was one of the first cultural publications in the United States, founded and edited by John Neal (1793–1876), and published in Portland, Maine, as a weekly periodical and later converted to a longer, monthly format. Its two-year run concluded at the end of 1829. The magazine is considered unique for its independent journalism at the time.

Neal used creative control of the magazine to improve his social status, help establish the American gymnastics movement, cover national politics, and critique American literature, art, theater, and social issues. Essays by Neal on American art and theater anticipated major changes and movements in those fields realized in the following decades. Conflicting opinions published in The Yankee on the cultural identity of Maine and New England presented readers with a complex portrait of the region.

Many new, predominantly female, writers and editors started their careers with contributions and criticism of their work published in The Yankee, including many who are familiar to modern readers. The articles on women's rights and early feminist ideas affirmed intellectual equality between men and women and demanded political and economic rights for women.

== Background ==
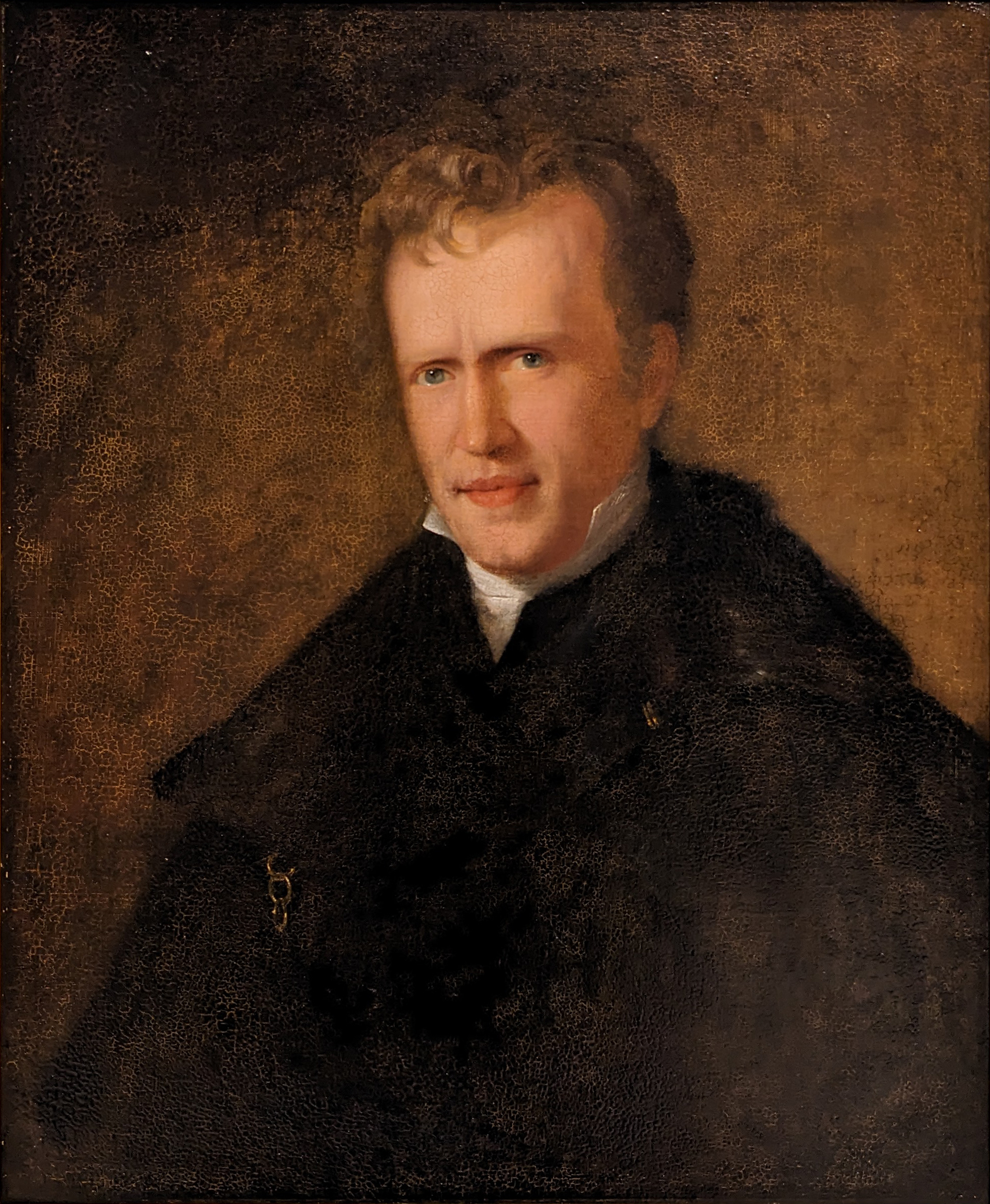
John Neal in 1823

John Neal grew up in Portland, Maine (then the District of Maine), and later lived in Boston, then Baltimore, where he pursued a dual career in law and literature following the bankruptcy of his dry goods business in 1816. After gaining national recognition as a critic, poet, and novelist, he sailed to London, where he wrote for British magazines and served as Jeremy Bentham's secretary.

Upon returning to his native Portland in 1827, Neal was confronted by community members who were offended by his literary work in the preceding years: the unsympathetic depiction of his hometown in his semi-autobiographical novel Errata (1823), the way he depicted New England dialect and customs in his novel Brother Jonathan (1825), and the criticism in his American Writers series in Blackwood's Magazine (1824–1825). Residents posted inflammatory broadsides calling Neal "a panderer for scandal against the country that nourished him" and a "renegado" who "basely traduced his native town and country for hire". Neal experienced verbal taunting and physical violence in the streets and an attempt to block his admission to the local bar association, though he had been a practicing lawyer in Baltimore (1820–1823). In the second half of 1827, he pursued several projects to further his personal goals and to vindicate himself to his local community. He joined the bar despite opposition, founded Maine's first athletic program, and established The Yankee. The first issue was published on January 1, 1828.

The idea came from a local bookseller who urged Neal shortly after his return to Portland to establish a new magazine or newspaper. Neal initially refused, not wanting to be the financial backer of his literary undertaking. The bookseller then offered to publish the periodical if Neal would serve as editor, which Neal accepted. Subscription to the new weekly magazine cost $3 a year, or $2.50 paid in advance.

The Yankee was Maine's first literary magazine and one of America's first cultural publications. Controversial at the time for its lack of association with any political party or interest group, it was a precursor for the independent American press that was established later in the century. When asked why he would establish such a magazine outside a major city, Neal said, "We mean to publish in Portland. Whatever the people of New-York, or Boston or Philadelphia or Baltimore might say, Portland is the place for us."

== Content ==
The Yankee functioned to educate Americans about England, spread Jeremy Bentham-inspired utilitarian philosophy, publish literary contributions, and critique American literature, American art, theater, politics, and social issues. The magazine also aided in establishing the US gymnastics movement, provided a forum for new writers, and promoted Neal's own accomplishments. Because Neal included a high proportion of his own work, self-promotion, and details of feuds with other public figures, "no magazine ever bore more fully the stamp of a personality", according to scholar Irving T. Richards. Around fifty authors contributed to the magazine, including John Greenleaf Whittier, Edgar Allan Poe, Albert Pike (later associate justice of the Arkansas Supreme Court), Grenville Mellen, Isaac Ray, and early published works by John Appleton (later chief justice of Maine).

=== Literary criticism ===
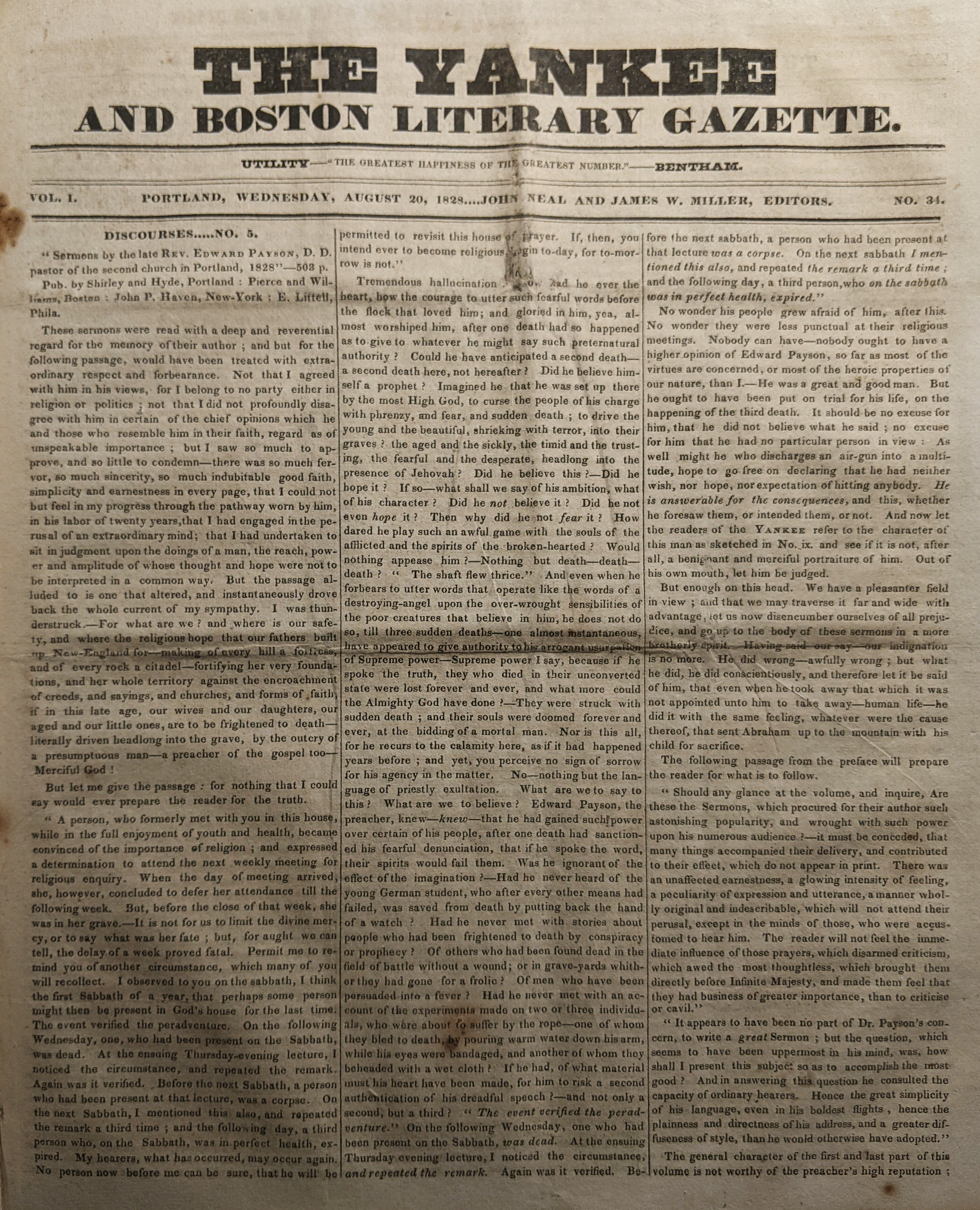
The first issue with the new name: August 20, 1828

Neal biographer Donald A. Sears felt that The Yankee's greatest impact was encouraging new authors through publication and criticism of their early works. For this, literature scholar John A. Pollard dubbed Neal "doctor of American literature". Poe, Whittier, Nathaniel Hawthorne, and Henry Wadsworth Longfellow all received their first impactful encouragement in The Yankee's pages. Most of the new authors whose careers it started were women, including Elizabeth Oakes Smith and others lesser known to history.

The Yankee is credited with having "discovered" Poe, and influenced the young writer's style with the magazine's essays. Poe considered Neal's September 1829 review of the poem "Fairy-Land" to be "the very first words of encouragement I ever remember to have heard". Poe became a contributor to the Ladies' Magazine shortly afterward – a relationship that may have been orchestrated by Neal. Whittier sought Neal's opinion in the magazine at a turning point in the poet's career, saying when he submitted a poem that "if you don't like it, say so privately; and 'I will quit poetry, and everything also of a literary nature, for I am sick at heart of the business'." In what may be the first review of Hawthorne's first novel, The Yankee referred to Fanshawe as "powerful and pathetic" and said that the author "should be encouraged to persevering efforts by a fair prospect of future success". An 1828 review of Longfellow noted "a fine genius and a pure and safe taste" but also cited the need for "a little more energy, and a little more stoutness".

=== Art criticism ===
Neal was the first American art critic. Scholars find his work in the novel Randolph (1823), Blackwood's Magazine (1824), and The Yankee to be the most historically important, in which he discussed leading American artists and their work "with unprecedented acumen and enthusiasm". The essay "Landscape and Portrait-Painting" (September 1829) anticipated John Ruskin's groundbreaking Modern Painters (1843) by distinguishing between "things seen by the artist" and "things as they are", as Ruskin put it more famously fourteen years later. In Neal's words in 1829, "There is not a landscape nor a portrait painter alive who dares to paint what he sees as he sees it; nor probably a dozen with power to see things as they are."

Neal's essays in The Yankee about landscape painting and its potential role in America's artistic renaissance anticipate the rise of the Hudson River School and provide early coverage (1828) of its founders, Thomas Doughty, Asher Brown Durand, and Thomas Cole. These essays also offer unprecedented coverage of reproduction technology like engraving and lithography and American portrait painters trained in the "humbler contingencies" of sign painting and applied arts. The Yankee published his extensive coverage of art featured in The Token and The Atlantic Souvenir annual gift books, which sometimes praised the engravers more than the painters. Neal's opinions on art in The Yankee carry a "a pungency rare in nineteenth century criticism", according to art scholar John W. McCoubrey. Fellow art scholar Harold E. Dickson said they "to a remarkable degree ... have stood the trying test of time."

=== Theatrical criticism ===
At the time The Yankee was in circulation, Neal was one of the most important critics of American drama. His serial essay "The Drama" (July–December 1829) elaborates upon opinions on theater originally published in the prefaces to his first play, Otho (1819) and his second poetry collection, The Battle of Niagara: Second Edition (1819). The essay dismissed well-accepted Shakespearean standards and outlined a prophecy for the future American drama that largely played out by the end of the century. Neal predicted that characters would become more relatable by expressing feelings "in common language" because "when a person talks beautifully in his sorrow, it shows both great preparation and insincerity." Instead of relying on highly cultivated circumstances in the plot, "The incidents will be such as every man may hope or dread to see ...; for it is there, and there only, that we can judge of a hero, or of a nation, or sympathize with either." This "thorough revolution in plays and players, authors and actors" called for in "The Drama" was still in process 60 years later when William Dean Howells was considered innovative for issuing the same criticism.

=== Political, social, and civic issues ===
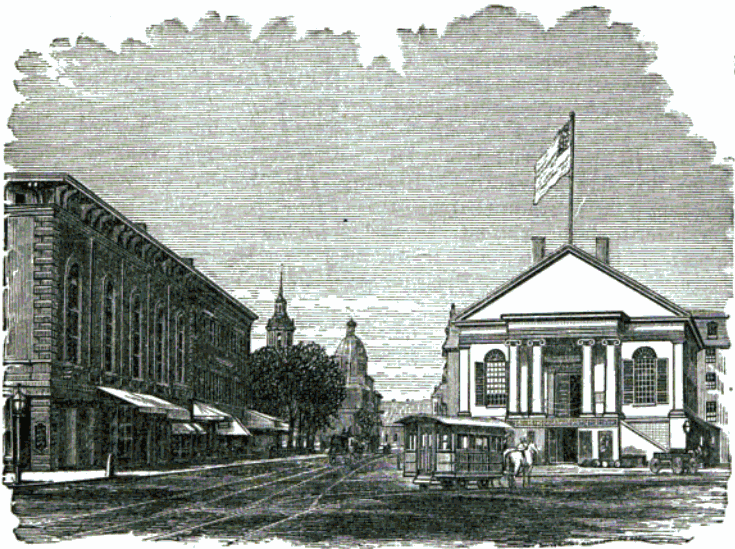
Neal's gymnasium in Portland's Market House was Maine's first athletic program.

The Yankee documented and offered commentary upon the period's nationally relevant social and political topics, such as the nullification crisis, the Tariff of Abominations, Andrew Jackson's spoils system, lotteries, temperance, women's rights, and the Maine-New Brunswick border issues that led to the 1838–1839 Aroostook War between the United States and the United Kingdom. He published a "vigorous campaign" of seventeen articles against lotteries over the course of 1828, claiming they encourage idle and reckless behavior among patrons, an argument he first conveyed in his novel Logan (1822). On a local level, Neal's advocacy in The Yankee contributed toward municipal funding being designated for the construction of Portland's first sidewalks.

In March 1828, Neal advertised his gymnasium in The Yankee as "accessible here to every body, without distinction of age or color", but when he sponsored six Black men to join, only two other members of three hundred voted to accept them. In May, Neal used his magazine to call out his fellow gymnasts' racial prejudice. He ended his involvement with the gym shortly thereafter.

=== Feminism ===
Neal's writing on gender and women's rights in The Yankee show his focus moving beyond inter-gender social manners and female educational opportunities and toward women's economic and political rights. In the first issue of the second volume, he asserted that unmarried women are treated unfairly "as if it were better for a woman to marry anybody than not to marry at all; or even to marry one that was not her selected and preferred of all than to go unmarried to her grave." The article "Rights of Women" (March 5, 1829) includes some of the "angriest and most assertive feminist claims" of his career, saying of coverture and suffrage that:

The truth is, that women are not citizens here; they pay taxes without being represented ...; if they are represented, it is by those whose interest, instead of being included in theirs, is directly opposed to theirs ...; they are not eligible to office; and they are not, nor is their property protected at law. So much for the equality of the sexes here ....

The solution, which he offered in "Woman" (March 26, 1828), was female solidarity and organizing to secure economic and political rights: "If woman would act with woman, there would be a stop to our tyranny". The Yankee also promoted female editors like Sarah Josepha Hale and Frances Harriet Whipple Green McDougall, and proclaimed the example of economic freedom these women provided: "We hope to see the day when she-editors will be as common as he-editors; and when our women of all ages ... will be able to maintain herself, without being obliged to marry for bread."

In other articles, The Yankee affirmed intellectual equality between men and women, opining that "When minds meet, all distinctions of sex are abolished" and "women are not inferior to men; they are unlike men. They cannot do all that men may do – any more than men may do all that women may do."

=== New England ===
The magazine's title word, Yankee, is a demonym used to refer to people from Maine and the other New England states. Holding his native state in high regard, Neal in the third issue of The Yankee claimed: "Her magnitude, her resources, and her character, we believe, are neither appreciated nor understood by the chief men" and the "great mass of the American people." To correct this, he published articles written by himself and others detailing the region's customs, traditions, and speech, particularly the series "Live Yankees" (March–June 1828), "New England As It Was" (March–November 1828), and "New England As It Is" (March–November 1828). He juxtaposed articles by separate authors with conflicting views and inserted his own editorial footnotes into others' essays to encourage discourse over the region's identity. Nineteenth-century American regionalists are known for sentimentally posing rural traditions in conflict with America's urbanization. In contrast, The Yankee presented the country's regions in a state of constant cultural evolution that beckons but thwarts characterization.

=== Feuds ===
Described by one scholar as "vinegary", the first volume of The Yankee (January 1 – December 24, 1828) documents literary feuds between Neal and other New England journalists like William Lloyd Garrison, Francis Ormand Jonathan Smith, and Joseph T. Buckingham. Tensions between Neal and Garrison started with Garrison's denunciation of Neal's literary criticism in Blackwood's Magazine (1824–1825) as a "renegade's base attempt to assassinate the reputation of this country" and continued with Neal's claim in The Yankee that Garrison was fired from his editorial position for attacking Neal in the paper. Journalist and historian Edward H. Elwell characterized Neal's willingness to publish these inflammatory back-and-forth letters and essays as the embodiment of "impulsive honesty and fair play". Neal stopped after receiving complaints from subscribers, which he also published in the magazine.

== Run of publication ==
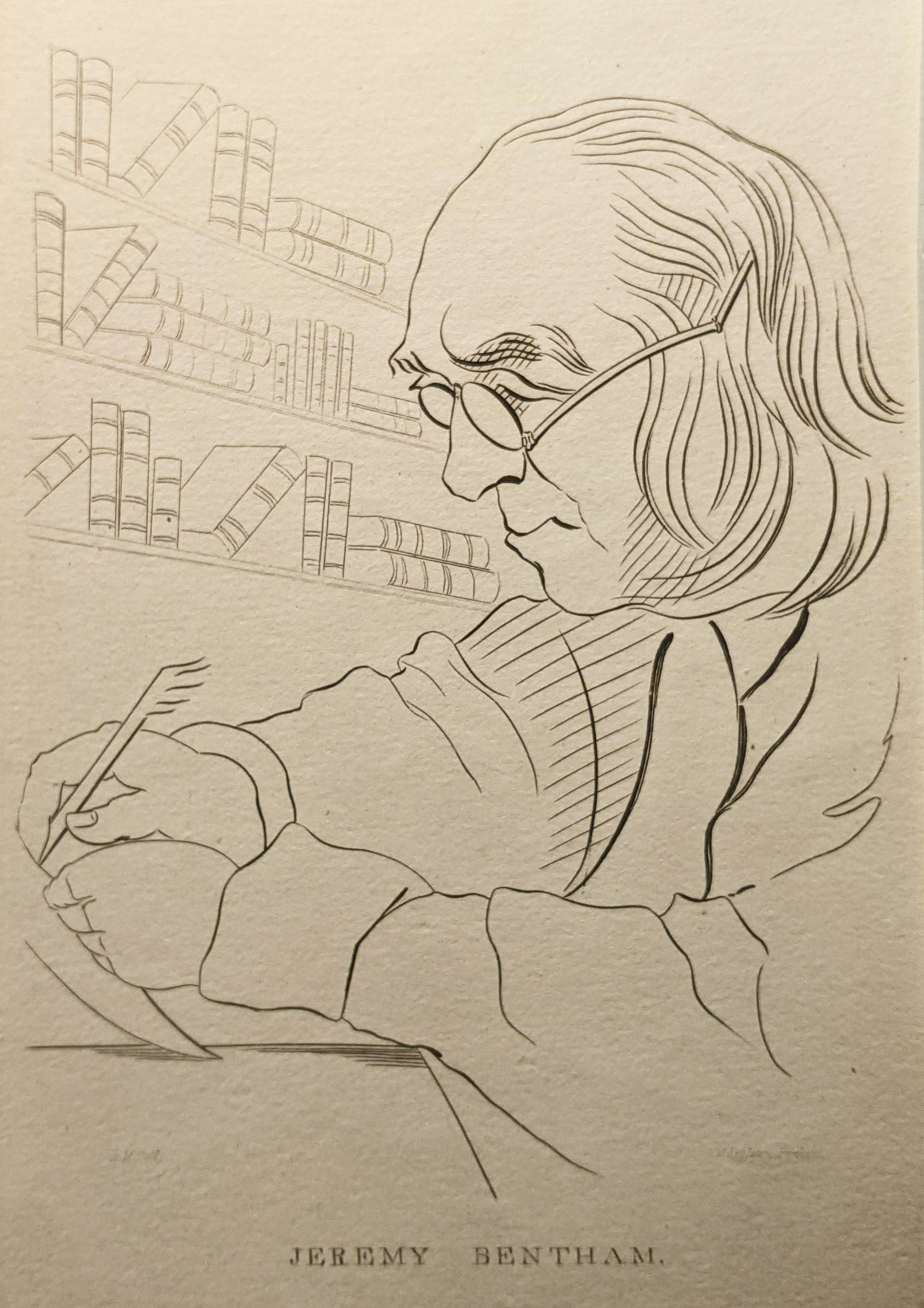
Frontispiece of new series volume 1, depicting Jeremy Bentham

The Yankee published regularly from the beginning of 1828 through the end of 1829, during which time the magazine changed its name, printing format, frequency, and volume numbering system. Volumes 1 and 2 (January 1, 1828, through July 3, 1829) are composed of eight-page weekly issues in quarto. New series volume 1 (July through December 1829) is composed of six, 56-page monthly issues in octavo. For financial reasons, Neal merged The Yankee with a Boston periodical and changed the name to The Yankee and Boston Literary Gazette, starting August 20, 1828 (volume 1, number 34).

When The Yankee ceased publication at the end of 1829, it merged with the Ladies' Magazine. The common misconception that it merged with the New England Galaxy is based on a misinterpretation of a passage in Neal's autobiography.
