= Mosses from an Old Manse =

1846 short story collection by American author Nathaniel Hawthorne

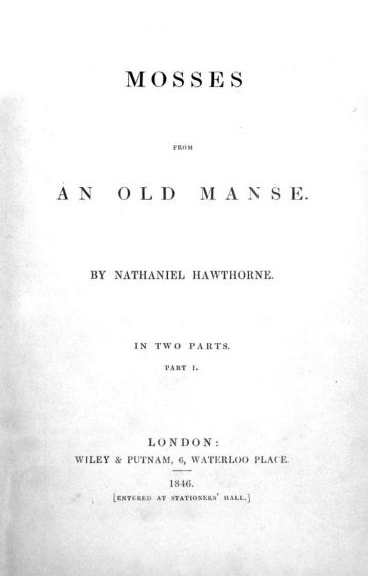
- Author: Nathaniel Hawthorne
- Language: English
- Genre: Short stories
- Publisher: Wiley & Putnam
- Publication date: 1846
- Publication place: United States
- Media type: Print (hardback)

Mosses from an Old Manse is a short story collection by Nathaniel Hawthorne, first published in 1846.

== Background and publication history ==
The collection includes several previously published short stories, and was named in honor of The Old Manse where Hawthorne and his wife lived for the first three years of their marriage. The first edition was published in 1846.

Hawthorne seems to have been paid $75 for the publication.

Hawthorne sent a copy of Mosses from an Old Manse to editor and critic Rufus Wilmot Griswold, who included excerpts in his anthology The Prose Writers of America in 1847.

== Analysis ==
Many of the tales collected in Mosses from an Old Manse are allegories and, typical of Hawthorne, focus on the negative side of human nature. Hawthorne's friend Herman Melville noted this aspect in his review "Hawthorne and His Mosses":

This black conceit pervades him through and through. You may be witched by his sunlight,—transported by the bright gildings in the skies he builds over you; but there is the blackness of darkness beyond; and even his bright gildings but fringe and play upon the edges of thunder-clouds.

William Henry Channing noted in his review of the collection, in The Harbinger, that its author "had been baptized in the deep waters of Tragedy", and his work was dark with only brief moments of "serene brightness", which was never brighter than "dusky twilight".

== Critical reception ==
After the book's first publication, Hawthorne sent copies to critics including Margaret Fuller, Rufus Wilmot Griswold, Edgar Allan Poe, and Henry Theodore Tuckerman. Poe responded with a lengthy review in which he praised Hawthorne's writing but faulted him for associating with New England journals, Ralph Waldo Emerson, and the Transcendentalists. He wrote, "Let him mend his pen, get a bottle of visible ink, come out from the Old Manse, cut Mr. Alcott, hang (if possible) the editor of 'The Dial,' and throw out of the window to the pigs all his odd numbers of the North American Review." A young Walt Whitman wrote that Hawthorne was underpaid, and it was unfair that his book competed with imported European books. He asked, "Shall real American genius shiver with neglect while the public runs after this foreign trash?" Generally, most contemporary critics praised the collection and considered it better than Hawthorne's earlier collection, Twice-Told Tales.

Regarding the second edition, published in 1854, Hawthorne wrote to publisher James T. Fields that he no longer understood the messages he was sending in these stories. He shared, "I remember that I always had a meaning—or, at least, thought I had", and noted "Upon my honor, I am not quite sure that I entirely comprehend my own meaning in some of these blasted allegories... I am a good deal changed since those times; and to tell you the truth, my past self is not very much to my taste, as I see in this book."

== Contents ==
- "The Old Manse" (1846)
- "The Birth-Mark" (1843)
- "A Select Party" (1844)
- "Young Goodman Brown" (1835)
- "Rappaccini's Daughter" (1844)
- "Mrs. Bullfrog" (1837)
- "Fire-Worship" (1843)
- "Buds and Bird-Voices" (1843)
- "Monsieur du Miroir" (1837)
- "The Hall of Fantasy" (1843)
- "The Celestial Railroad" (1843)
- "The Procession of Life" (1843)
- "The New Adam and Eve" (1843)
- "Egotism; or, The Bosom-Serpent" (1843)
- "The Christmas Banquet" (1844)
- "Drowne's Wooden Image" (1844)
- "The Intelligence Office" (1844)
- "Roger Malvin's Burial" (1832)
- "P.'s Correspondence" (1845)
- "Earth's Holocaust" (1844)
- "The Old Apple-Dealer" (1843)
- "The Artist of the Beautiful" (1844)
- "A Virtuoso's Collection" (1842)

=== Added to second edition in 1854 ===
- "Feathertop" (1852)
- "Passages from a Relinquished Work" (1834)
- "Sketches from Memory" (1835)
