= Goodwife =

Archaic English form of address

Goodwife (Scots: Guidwife), usually abbreviated Goody, was a polite form of address for women, formerly used as Mrs., Miss and Ms. are used today. Its male counterpart is Goodman. However, a woman addressed by this title was of a lesser social rank than a woman addressed as Mistress.

Goodwife and Goody were used in England, Scotland, and Colonial United States, with the earliest known use circa 1325. By the mid-18th century they had become archaic outside Scotland, and they are perhaps best known today as the forms of address used in period literature, like Arthur Miller's historical fiction The Crucible.

The title also appears in the expression Goody Two-Shoes, which is sometimes credited to the 1765 children's book The History of Little Goody Two-Shoes, though it was first used at least a century earlier.

== Usage ==
Goodwife is a term used to designate women of high social status, typically civilian wives. However, in England, these were not people of the gentry. Goodwives were typically involved in civilian duties but did not necessarily join in church activities.

The term has also had very specific meanings for certain groups. Between 1523 and 1547, the term goodwife was used in Coventry cappers to denote wives who had taken over their husbands' businesses before or after their husbands' deaths. There were some, especially ministers, who believed that this term should be used to address church members reflecting such member's moral status.

=== Colonial America ===
The address Goodwife was coined in England and then used in colonial America. By the time it migrated over, the term was already declining in popularity in England. It remained in usage in New England until the early 1800s. The term was also used in mid-Atlantic colonies as well, but was not used with any significant fervor in comparison to New England. The decline of this address fell as Puritan ideals did.

A precise definition of Goodwife in colonial America is elusive owing to the term's varied and ambiguous usage. However, it can be linked to Puritan ideals as it was considered an address of respect.

=== England ===
The address Goodwife was already declining in popularity by the 1700s in England. By this time, the address meant little to nothing; there is evidence of those who had commonly used the form of address now requested to be called Master or Mistress. Also, around this time, people were listing no address or Goodwife interchangeably.

While this term was to denote women of high social standing, there were terms for women above these. Above Goodwife was Madam and above that was Dame. Despite Goodwife indicating lower social status than Madam or Dame, it was not considered an insult to address someone of lower status as Goodwife during times of high usage in England. It was "an indication of good neighborliness". However, in the 1778 novel Evelina, Captain Mervin uses the term to insult his wife, who, as a member of the gentry, should be referred to as Madame or Mistress.

== Shift towards "Mistress" ==
Goodwife was one of the many forms of address towards women at the time. While Goodwife and Mistress were used at the same point, there was a noticeable shift from calling women Goodwife to Mistress and ultimately the usage of Goodwife faded out around the 18th century. However, there is evidence that points towards Goodwife being used longer than Goodman.

Regardless, the term did fade into obscurity all the same. This shifted as Puritan ideals were not held in such high regards, especially as the legal system moved towards secular trends in both England and New England.

In England, the term Goodwife was not used by 1700. By 1780, the forms of address Master or Mister and Miss(tress) were used almost universally despite social differences. The only exception is that those women of especially high social status were called Lady.

In modern use, Goody is generally associated with witches, probably as a result of Eunice Cole and Sarah Osborne and other women accused of witchcraft being referred to as Goody rather than by their first names. Several of the Ramtops Witches in Terry Pratchett's Discworld novels are given the title.

== See also ==
- Young Goodman Brown
