= Brenda Wineapple =

American nonfiction writer, literary critic and essayist

- Born: Boston, Massachusetts
- Education: Brandeis University, University of Wisconsin–Madison
- Writing career
- Genre: Non-fiction
- Subject: Arts
- Notable awards: Marfield Prize

Brenda Wineapple is an American non-fiction writer, literary critic, and essayist who has written several books on nineteenth-century American writers.

== Biography ==
Born in Boston, Massachusetts, she graduated from Brandeis University, and University of Wisconsin.

In 2014, Wineapple received a Literature Award in Literature from the American Academy of Arts and Letters, and her book White Heat: The Friendship of Emily Dickinson and Thomas Wentworth Higginson was a finalist for a National Book Critics Circle Award.

She has received a Guggenheim fellowship, a Pushcart Prize, a fellowship from the American Council of Learned Societies, and three National Endowment for the Humanities fellowships. Elected a Fellow of the Society of American Historians and the American Academy of Arts and Sciences, she is also an elected Fellow of the New York Institute for the Humanities at New York University and was the Donald C. Gallup Fellow at the Beinecke Library, Yale University, as well as a fellow of the Indiana Institute of Arts and Letters. She serves as literary advisor for the Guggenheim Foundation and the Library of America, and she is on the advisor board of Lapham's Quarterly and The American Scholar.

Wineapple teaches in the Master of Fine Arts programs at Columbia University's School of the Arts and at the New School in New York City. She was previously the Director of the Leon Levy Center for Biography at the Graduate School of the City University of New York, and its Writer-in-Residence. She has also taught at Sarah Lawrence College and Union College in Schenectady, New York, and in the summer MFA program of Johns Hopkins University in Florence, Italy.

She is a regular contributor to The New York Times Book Review, The Nation and The New York Review of Books. She is also the editor of The Selected Poetry of John Greenleaf Whittier (a volume in the Library of America's American Poets Project) and Nineteenth-Century American Writers on Writing (a volume in The Writers' World, edited by Edward Hirsch).

She is married to the composer Michael Dellaira.

== Works ==
- Genêt: A Biography of Janet Flanner. New York: Ticknor & Fields, 1989; University of Nebraska Press, 1992. It is the first and only biography of the woman who wrote "The Paris Letter" for The New Yorker for fifty years, starting at its founding in 1925.
- Sister Brother: Gertrude and Leo Stein. Putnam's, 1996; University of Nebraska, 1997. It is a dual biography of the relationship between Gertrude Stein and her brother Leo Stein, whose collection of modern art was unparalleled and whose salon in Paris was the celebrated gathering place of writers and artists.
- Hawthorne: A Life. Knopf, 2003; Random House, 2004.
- "Hawthorne and Melville; or, The Ambiguities", in Argersinger, Jana L. and Person, Leland S., eds. Hawthorne and Melville: Writing a Relationship (2008).
- White Heat: The Friendship of Emily Dickinson and Thomas Wentworth Higginson. Knopf, 2008. It was a finalist for the National Book Critics Circle Award, a winner of the Marfield Prize for Arts Writing, and a New York Times "Notable Book". It was named one of the Best Books of 2008 by The Times Literary Supplement, The Washington Post, The Economist, The Christian Science Monitor, The Providence Journal, and The Kansas City Star, among other publications.
- Ecstatic Nation: Confidence, Crisis, and Compromise, 1848–1877. Harper, 2013. It was named a New York Times "Notable Book". It was also listed as one of the best nonfiction books in 2013 by Kirkus Reviews and Bookpage and received a Publishers Weekly starred "Review of the Week".
- The Impeachers: The Trial of Andrew Johnson and the Dream of a Just Nation. Random House, 2019. It received a starred review from Publishers Weekly.
- Walt Whitman Speaks: His Final Thoughts on Life, Writing, Spirituality, and the Promise of America as told to Horace Traubel, edited by Brenda Wineapple. Library of America, 2019.
- Keeping the Faith: God, Democracy, and the Trial That Riveted a Nation. Random House, 2024. On the Scopes monkey trial.
