= The Birth-Mark =

Short story by Nathaniel Hawthorne

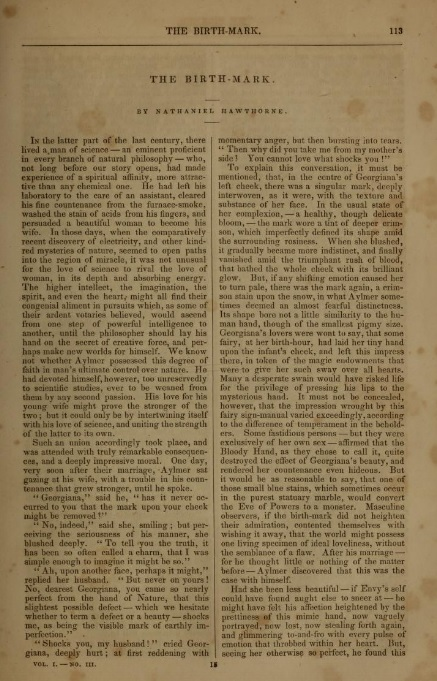
"The Birth-Mark", The Pioneer, March 1843

"The Birth-Mark" is a short story by American author Nathaniel Hawthorne. The tale examines obsession with human perfection. It was first published in the March 1843 edition of The Pioneer and later appeared in Mosses from an Old Manse, a collection of Hawthorne's short stories published in 1846.

== Plot summary ==
Aylmer is a brilliant and recognized scientist and philosopher who drops his focus from his career and experiments to marry the beautiful Georgiana. She is physically perfect except for a small red birthmark in the shape of a hand on her cheek.

As the story progresses, Aylmer becomes unnaturally obsessed with the birthmark on Georgiana's cheek. One night, he dreams of cutting the birthmark out of his wife's cheek, and then, realizing that the birthmark is deeper, continuing all the way to her heart. When Aylmer describes his dream to her, Georgiana declares that she would rather risk her life having the birthmark removed from her cheek than to continue to endure Aylmer's horror and distress that comes upon him when he sees her.

The following day, Aylmer decides to take Georgiana to his laboratory. He glances at Georgiana with the intent to console her but can't help but shudder violently at seeing the birthmark; Aylmer's reaction causes her to faint. When she awakens, he treats her warmly and comforts her with some of his scientific concoctions, but when he attempts to take a portrait of her, the image is blurred save for her birthmark revealing the disgust he has of it.

As he experiments with ways to remove the birthmark, Georgiana begins to loathe the red mark she had once considered a lucky charm. One day, she follows him into his laboratory, and on seeing her there, Aylmer accuses her of not trusting him and says that having her birthmark in the room will foil his efforts. She professes complete trust in him but demands that he inform her of his experiments. He agrees and reveals that his current experiment is his last attempt to remove the birthmark. Georgiana vows to take the potion, regardless of any danger it poses to her.

Soon after, Aylmer brings her the potion, which he demonstrates as effective by rejuvenating a diseased plant with a few drops. Protesting that she doesn't need proof to trust her husband, Georgiana drinks the concoction and promptly falls asleep. Aylmer watches and rejoices as the birthmark fades little by little. Once it is nearly gone, Georgiana wakes up to see her image in a mirror, the birthmark almost completely faded. She smiles but then informs Aylmer that she is dying. Once the birthmark fades completely, Georgiana dies.

== Publication history ==
"The Birth-Mark" was first published in the short-lived Boston magazine The Pioneer in its March 1843 issue. That same month, it was also printed in The Pathfinder in New York and, later, collected as part of Mosses from an Old Manse in 1846.

== Analysis ==
Like many of the tales Hawthorne wrote during his time living in The Old Manse, "The Birth-Mark" discusses the psychological impact in sexual relations. The birthmark does not become an issue to Aylmer until after the marriage, which he suddenly sees as sexual: "now vaguely portrayed, now lost, now stealing forth again, and glimmering to-and-fro with every pulse of emotion". Written shortly after Hawthorne married Sophia Peabody, the story emphasizes the husband's sexual guilt disguised as superficial cosmetology.

Aylmer's pursuit of perfection is both tragic and allegorical. The irony of Aylmer's obsession and pursuit is that he was a man whose "most splendid successes were almost invariably failures." Rather than obsessing over correcting his failures, he quickly forgets them. Similarly, instead of obsessing over Georgiana's splendid beauty, he quickly forgets it. That a man of so many failures would be trying to perfect someone else is both ironic and allegorical. This type of story has biblical symmetry to Jesus's "Sermon on the Mount." In Matthew 7:3, Christ is quoted as saying, "Why do you see the speck that is in your brother's eye, but do not notice the log that is in your own eye?" Aylmer's unyielding pursuit to remove the one "flaw" from Georgiana shows his own blindness of conscience. Georgiana's death is foreshadowed in Aylmer's dream of cutting out the mark, in which he discovers the birthmark is connected to her heart. He elects to cut out her heart as well in his attempt to remove the birthmark.

Other critics, like Stephen Youra, suggest that, to Aylmer, the birthmark represents the flaws within the human race—which includes "original sin", which "woman has cast men into"—and because of this, elects it as the symbol of his wife's "liability to sin, sorrow, decay, and death". Others suggest viewing the tale "as a story of failure rather than as the success story it really is — the demonstration of how to murder your wife and get away with it".

Hawthorne may have been criticizing the epoch of reform in which he was living, and specifically calling attempts at reform ineffective and the reformers dangerous. The story is often compared to Edgar Allan Poe's "The Oval Portrait".

=== Character analysis ===
Aylmer is a scientist and husband to Georgiana. Robert B. Heilman suggests that Aylmer has taken science as his religion and that Aylmer’s views on "the best that the Earth could offer" is "inadequate". Heilman further says that "the mistake Aylmer makes" is the "critical problem" with the story, in that he has "apotheosized science".

Georgiana is married to Aylmer and, as Sarah Bird Wright puts it, the "doomed heroine" of the story. Georgiana agrees to allow Aylmer to experiment on her in an attempt to remove her birthmark—which turns out to be a fatal decision. Wright quotes Millicent Bell's thoughts on Georgiana's final words by saying they are "indicative of Hawthorne’s struggle with romanticism... he yearns to depict life as found".

Aminadab, Aylmer's laboratory assistant, is described as being short and bulky with a shaggy appearance; Aylmer addresses him as "thou human machine" and "thou man of clay." Wright refers to Nancy Bunge's observation that "because Aminadab possesses vast physical strength and 'earthiness' he undertakes to perform unpleasant tasks in order to free Aylmer to 'cultivate delusions of transcendence'". Judith Fetterley suggests that "Aminadab symbolizes the earthly, physical, erotic self that has been split apart from Aylmer".

== Adaptation ==
The story was adapted into a one-act opera by Jean Eichelberger Ivey, written between 1980 and 1982.

In 1987, it was adapted as a 30-minute short film by Jay Woelfel, which went on to garner two Emmys and an Obie award in 1993, after debuting on PBS.
