= The United States Magazine and Democratic Review =

Former American periodical

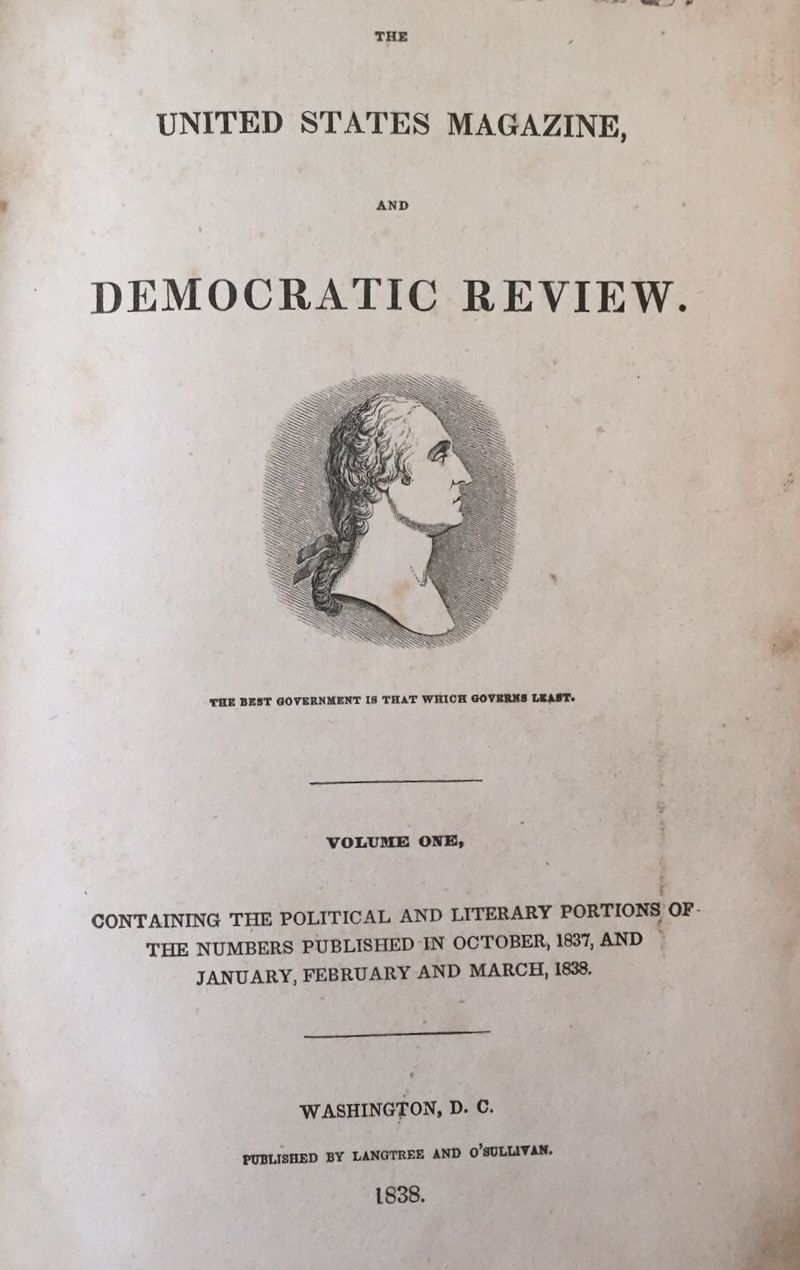
The United States Magazine and Democratic Review, Volume one, 1838, containing the political and literary portions of the numbers published in October 1837, and January, February and March, 1838. Washington D.C. Published by Langtree and O'Sullivan.

The United States Magazine and Democratic Review was a periodical published from 1837 to 1859 by John L. O'Sullivan. Its motto, "The best government is that which governs least", was famously paraphrased by Henry David Thoreau in "Resistance to Civil Government", better known as Civil Disobedience, and is often erroneously attributed to Thomas Jefferson.

== History ==
In 1837, O'Sullivan co-founded and served as editor for The United States Magazine and Democratic Review (generally called the Democratic Review). It was a highly regarded journal meant to champion Jacksonian Democracy, a movement which had usually been disparaged in the more conservative North American Review. The magazine featured political essays, many of them penned by O'Sullivan himself, extolling the virtues of Jacksonian democracy and criticizing what Democrats regarded as the aristocratic pretensions of their opponents. The journal supported the losing effort of Martin Van Buren in the 1840 presidential election, and in the 1844 election, James K. Polk, the eventual winner.

As a leading organizer for the Democratic Party, Van Buren paid close attention to party communication media such as newspapers and magazines. They received subsidies in the form of government printing contracts. At an intellectual level, his administration was strongly supported by The United States Magazine and Democratic Review. Its editorials and articles provided the arguments that partisan needed to discuss Democratic Party positions on the Mexican War, slavery, states' rights, and Indian removal.

The Democratic Review was also (perhaps even primarily) a literary magazine, promoting the development of American literature. Some of its regular contributors were Elizabeth Barrett Browning, Nathaniel Hawthorne, Elizabeth F. Ellet, and John Greenleaf Whittier, with occasional contributions by William Cullen Bryant, Fanny Kemble, and James Fenimore Cooper. The Review also published some of the early work of Walt Whitman, James Russell Lowell, and Henry David Thoreau. Hawthorne and O'Sullivan became close friends, and Hawthorne had more pieces published in O'Sullivan's magazine than in any other periodical. The Democratic Review was always in financial difficulties since it accepted no advertising and relied on subscriptions and donations to survive. O'Sullivan relinquished his editorial duties for a short time to practice law but continued to write for the magazine.

The magazine is also responsible for coining the term "manifest destiny", referring to the combination of rapid growth of civilization and open space to grow in North America.

== See also ==
- Young America Movement
