= The Snow-Image, and Other Twice-Told Tales =

1851 short story collection by Nathaniel Hawthorne

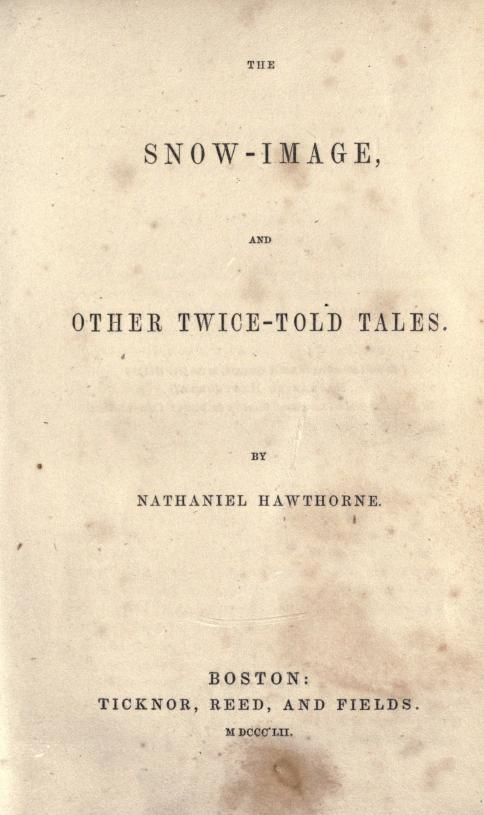
- Author: Nathaniel Hawthorne
- Language: English
- Genre: Short stories
- Publisher: Ticknor, Reed & Fields
- Publication date: 1851
- Publication place: United States
- Media type: Print (Hardback)

The Snow-Image, and Other Twice-Told Tales is a collection of short stories by American author Nathaniel Hawthorne. Released in late 1851 with a copyright of 1852, it is the final collection of tales by Hawthorne published in his lifetime.

== Background ==
After publishing his collection Mosses from an Old Manse in 1846, Hawthorne mostly turned away from the short tales that had marked the majority of his career to that point. In the interim period leading up to the collection The Snow-Image, and Other Twice-Told Tales, he wrote only four new stories: "Main-street", "Feathertop", "The Snow-Image", and "The Great Stone Face". All but "Feathertop" would be included in the new collection.

In his preface to the collection, Hawthorne playfully noted that his confessional tone in writing about himself should not be trusted: "[T]hese things hide the man instead of displaying him", he wrote, and suggested that readers seeking "essential traits" of the author "must make quite another kind of inquest", specifically that "you must look through the whole range of his fictitious characters, good and evil".

== Publication history ==
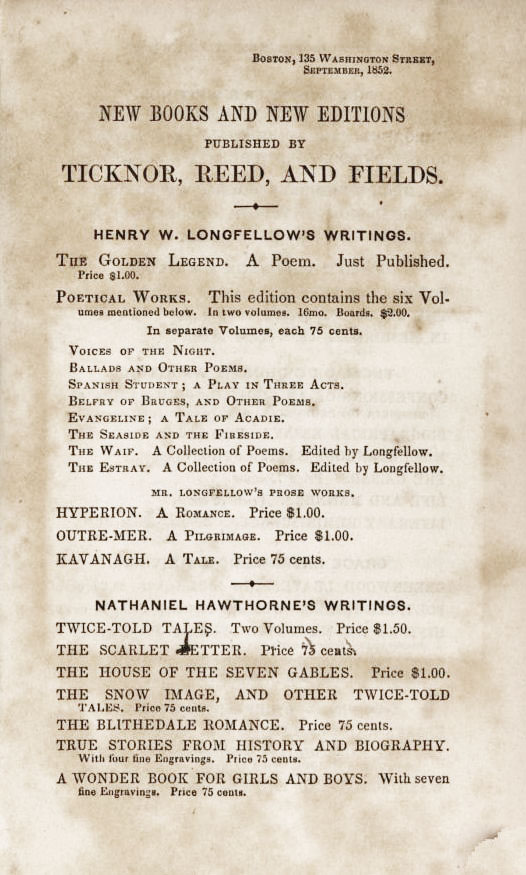
Advertisement from Ticknor, Reed and Fields advertising several of Hawthorne's works in 1852

Hawthorne was ending his brief stay in Lenox, Massachusetts, as The Snow-Image, and Other Twice Told Tales was being prepared. During his time there, Hawthorne had befriended Herman Melville, who had just published Moby-Dick with a dedication to Hawthorne as Hawthorne was preparing the preface for his new book. Publisher James T. Fields compiled the collection of 15 tales and sketches and published it in book form in December 1851. Commercially, it was Hawthorne's least popular book.

Hawthorne dedicated the collection to his friend Horatio Bridge, who had subsidized his first collection years earlier. In his dedicatory letter, Hawthorne directly addressed Bridge: "If anybody is responsible for my being at this day an author, it is yourself." Hawthorne also fondly recalled the time he shared with Bridge as students at Bowdoin College:

we were lads together at a country college,—gathering blueberries, in study-hours, under those tall academic pines; or watching the great logs, as they tumbled along the current of the Androscoggin; or shooting pigeons and grey squirrels in the woods; or bat-fowling in the summer twilight; or catching trouts in that shadowy little stream which, I suppose, is still wandering riverward through the forest.

Bridge believed that Hawthorne "overvalued" his friendship but after Hawthorne's death his widow Sophia Hawthorne assured him that the admiration was deserved: "He had the utmost reliance upon you, and reposed upon it with infinite satisfaction. It seems to me not a small merit to have inspired in him such respect, love and trust as he invariably expressed for you... he had no more thorough friend than you in the world, and I know he thought so."

== Contents ==
- Preface (1852)
- "The Snow-Image" (1850)
- "The Great Stone Face" (1850)
- "Main-street" (1849)
- "Ethan Brand" (1850)
- "A Bell's Biography" (1837)
- "Sylph Etherege" (1838)
- "The Canterbury Pilgrims" (1833)
- "Old News" (1835)
- "The Man of Adamant" (1837)
- "The Devil in Manuscript" (1835)
- "John Inglefield's Thanksgiving"(1840)
- "Old Ticonderoga" (1836)
- "The Wives of the Dead" (1832)
- "Little Daffydowndilly" (1843)
- "My Kinsman, Major Molineux" (1832)
