= Fireside poets =

19th-century New England poet group

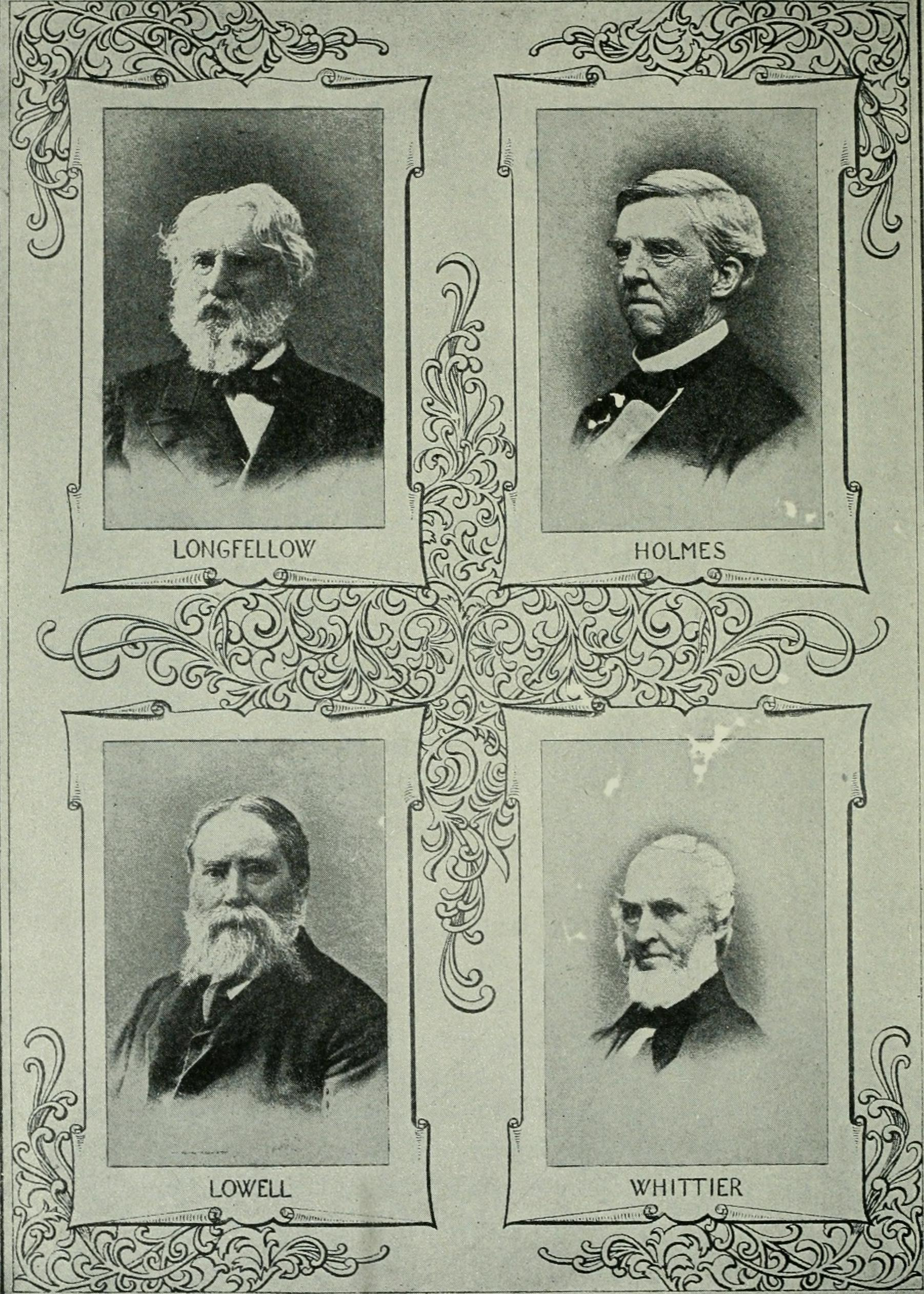
1913 image featuring portraits representing four of the fireside poets: Longfellow, Holmes, Lowell, and Whittier

The fireside poets – also known as the schoolroom or household poets – were a group of 19th-century American poets associated with New England. These poets were very popular among readers and critics both in the United States and overseas. Their domestic themes and messages of morality presented in conventional poetic forms deeply shaped their era until their decline in popularity at the beginning of the 20th century.

== Overview ==
The group is typically thought to include Henry Wadsworth Longfellow, William Cullen Bryant, John Greenleaf Whittier, James Russell Lowell, and Oliver Wendell Holmes Sr., who were the first American poets whose popularity rivaled that of British poets, both at home and abroad. Ralph Waldo Emerson is occasionally included in the group as well. The name "fireside poets" is derived from that popularity; their writing was a source of entertainment for families gathered around the fire at home. The name was further inspired by Longfellow's 1850 poetry collection The Seaside and the Fireside. Lowell published a book titled Fireside Travels in 1864 which helped solidify the title.

In an era without radio, television, or Internet, these poets were able to garner a general public popularity that has no equivalent in the 21st century. Their influence was furthered by their long lives, as well as their other high-profile activities, including serving as professors and academic chairs, editing popular newspapers, serving as foreign diplomats, giving popular speeches, and translating works by Dante and Homer.

These poets' general adherence to poetic convention (standard forms, regular meter, and rhymed stanzas) made their body of work particularly suitable for memorization and recitation in school and at home. Only Emerson rejected the traditional European forms that his contemporaries often utilized and instead called for new American poetic models and emphasized content over form. The poets' primary subjects were domestic life, mythology, and the politics of the United States, in which several of them were directly involved. The fireside poets did not write for the sake of other poets, for critics, or for posterity. Instead, they wrote for a contemporary audience of general readers. Emerson once wrote, "I embrace the common, I explore and sit at the feet of the familiar, the low."

A culminating event was the 70th birthday party of Whittier in 1877 organized by publisher Henry Oscar Houghton, editor of the Atlantic Monthly. The event was meant to serve as a symbol of the magazine's association with the poets. Most of them were present for the celebration, though Lowell had recently moved to Spain. Mark Twain gave an infamous after-dinner speech in which he satirized the poets as uncouth drunkards. In his story, three impostors pretend to be Longfellow, Emerson, and Holmes, and forget which poet authored which poem. The speech was scandalous because it showed a lack of reverence and, in turn, Twain felt guilty for his transgression and wrote notes to the poets apologizing for it. Longfellow's 74th birthday in 1881 was honored nationwide with celebrations in schools throughout the United States. Between 1884 and 1900, readers' polls consistently placed these poets as the nation's most important writers.

Generally, these poets promoted nationalist values and, as such, were deemed especially appropriate for study among children. Horace Scudder in his 1888 book Literature in School emphasized this point:

They were born on American soil; they have breathed American air; they were nurtured on American ideas. They are Americans of Americans. They are as truly the issue of our national life as are the common schools in which we glory. During the fifty years in which our common-school system has been growing to maturity, these six have lived and sung; and I dare to say that the lives and songs of Bryant, Emerson, Longfellow, Whittier, Holmes, and Lowell have an imperishable value regarded as exponents of national life.

Teachers through modern times have frequently emphasized the fireside poets in the classroom. According to scholar Kevin Stein, this emphasis reflects an expectation that poetry should have didactic messages and that poems can be used for moral betterment. Young readers, however, often turn away from this type of poetry because they dislike such sermonizing tones.

== Recognition and decline ==
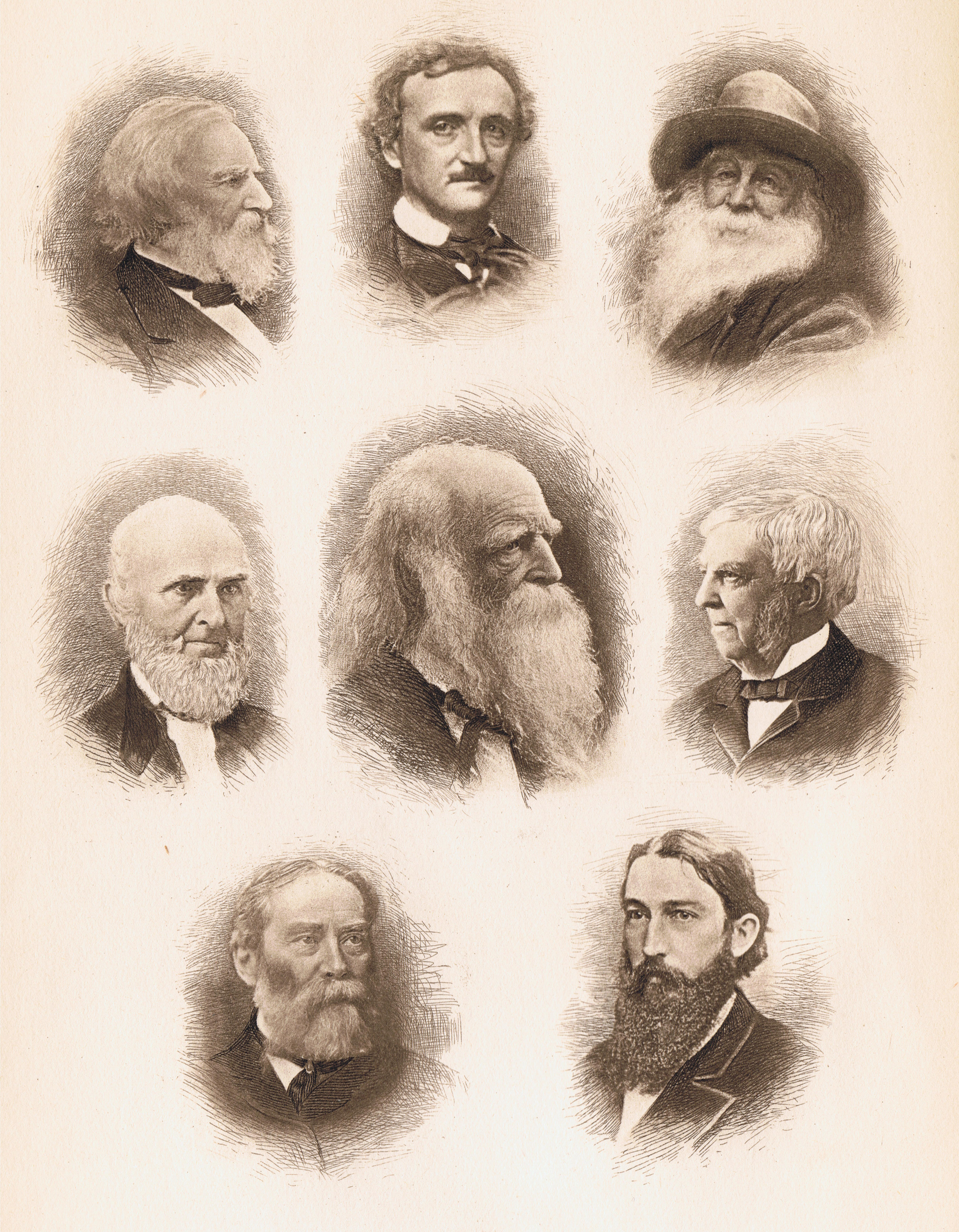
The addition of Sidney Lanier, Walt Whitman, and Edgar Allan Poe to the frontispiece of Edmund Clarence Stedman's An American Anthology in 1900 indicated the beginning of a canonical shift away from the fireside poets.

In 1901, Emerson and Longfellow were inducted as inaugural members of the Hall of Fame for Great Americans, which added Lowell and Whittier in 1905 and Holmes and Bryant in 1910. Longfellow was commemorated with a bust in Poet's Corner of Westminster Abbey in London; he was the first non-British writer honored this way and remains the only American poet represented with a bust. Even before the end of the century, however, Lowell acknowledged a change in the poetic climate and feared the erasure of gentlemanly gentility in emerging poetry. He wrote to William Dean Howells: "The danger of our literature... seems to me to be lawlessness & want of scholarly refinement. This is the rock I see ahead just now, & I fear we may go to pieces on it if we don't look sharp." Holmes died in 1894, the last of the fireside poets, and one literary magazine called it "the closing of an era in American literature".

Critics, meanwhile, began re-examining the role of these poets in the canon and distinguishing between popularity and aesthetics. As the twentieth century began, academics began to turn to poets such as Walt Whitman, Edwin Arlington Robinson, and Robert Frost. Anthologist Edmund Clarence Stedman released his exhaustive An American Anthology, 1787–1900, and the frontispiece artwork featured the fireside poets sharing space with Whitman, Edgar Allan Poe, and Sidney Lanier, which visually emphasized the canonical shift.

Fireside poets were soon regarded as old-fashioned. In 1904, for example, The Dial noted, "The message of our older poets, it is true, has lost something of its timeliness with the lapse of years, and they have not found the successors that we could have wished; but we doubt greatly if a new Longfellow or a new Lowell could now become a real force in our national life". Professor Lawrence Buell wrote that modern scholars "value [them] less than the nineteenth century did but still regard [them] as the mainstream of nineteenth-century New England verse." Their work was increasingly emphasized in the classroom, so many of these poets were dismissed merely as children's poets, as noted by a 20th-century scholar who asked, "Who, except wretched schoolchildren, now reads Longfellow?" Longfellow was particularly criticized. Literary scholar Kermit Vanderbilt noted, "Increasingly rare is the scholar who braves ridicule to justify the art of Longfellow's popular rhymings." Twentieth-century poet Lewis Turco called Longfellow a minor and derivative poet who was "nothing more than a hack imitator of the English Romantics." Holmes, according to one modern scholar, is now the least likely of the Fireside Poets to be anthologized.

Many of the new and emerging poets displayed resentment towards America's poetic past, including T. S. Eliot. An exception was Robert Frost, who named his first book A Boy's Will after a line by Longfellow. Wallace Stevens was a student at Harvard College when the fireside poets were at their height; he recalled that "it was commonplace to say that all the poetry had been written". Whitman was a contemporary of the fireside poets who complained that they were too focused on reflecting English styles and themes in American poetry: "Thus far, impress'd by New England writers and schoolmasters, we tacitly abandon ourselves to the notion that our United States have been fashion'd from the British Islands only, and essentially form a second England only—which is a very great mistake".

Longfellow, Lowell, and Holmes are featured in the bestselling novel The Dante Club by Matthew Pearl, published in 2003.

== Gallery ==
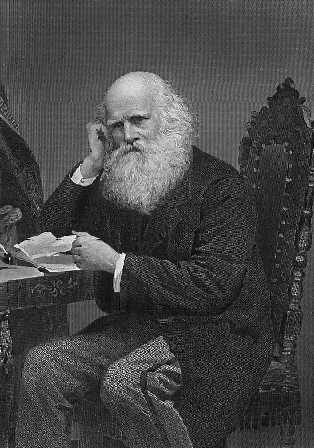
Bryant

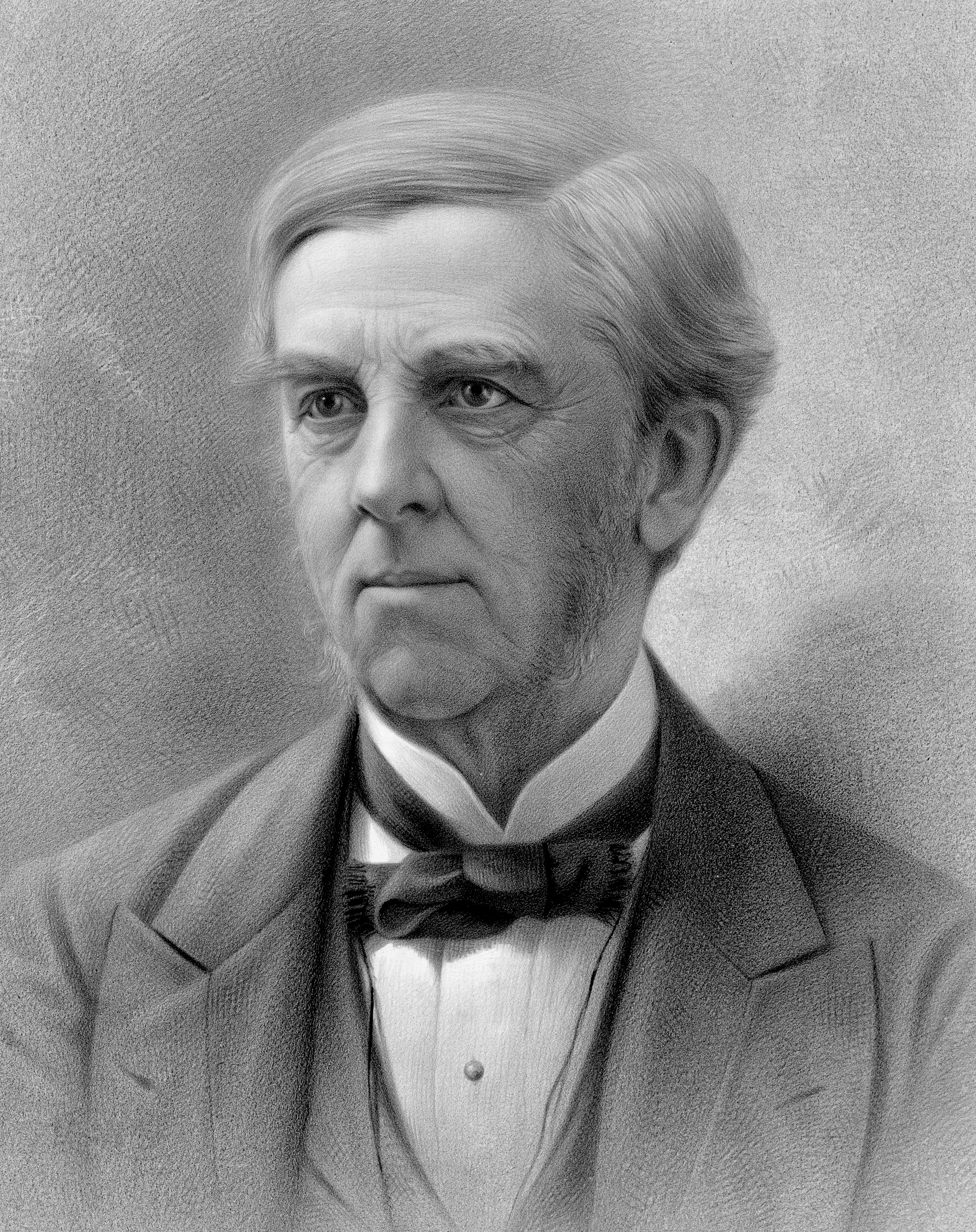
Holmes

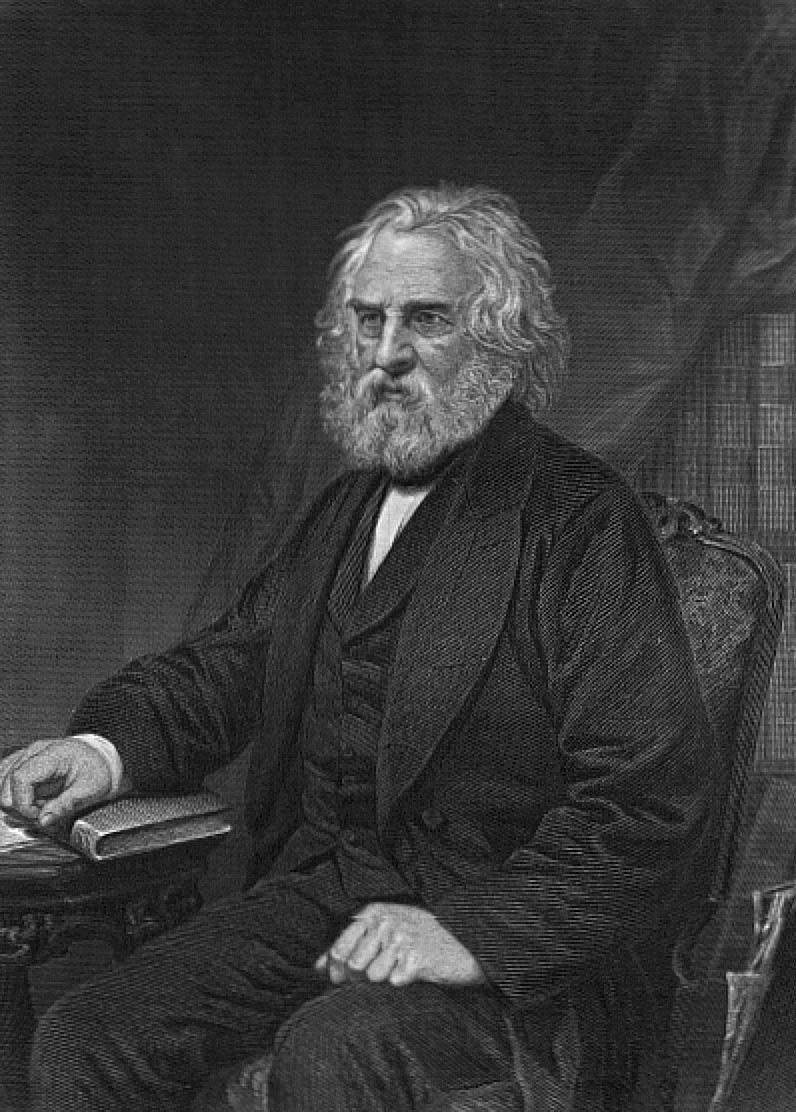
Longfellow

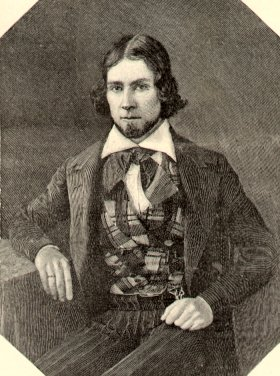
Lowell

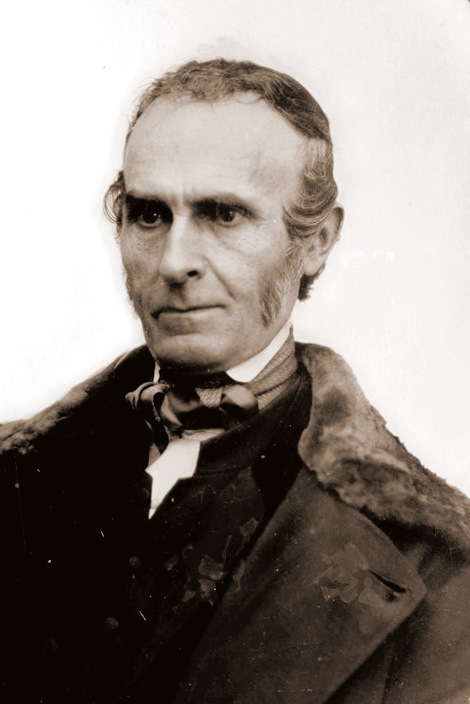
Whittier
