= My Kinsman, Major Molineux =

- Short story by Nathaniel Hawthorne
- Country: United States
- Language: English
- Genre: Short story

Publication
- Published in: The Token (1st); The Snow-Image, and Other Twice-Told Tales
- Publication type: Periodical (1st); Short story collection
- Publisher: Samuel Goodrich (1st); Ticknor, Reed & Fields
- Media type: Print
- Publication date: 1832 (1st); 1852

"My Kinsman, Major Molineux" is a short story written by American author Nathaniel Hawthorne in 1831. It first appeared anonymously in the 1832 edition of The Token, published by Samuel Goodrich. It later appeared —this time under Hawthorne's name — in The Snow-Image, and Other Twice-Told Tales, a collection of short stories by Hawthorne published in 1852 by Ticknor, Reed & Fields. The story exemplifies the darkest times of American development.

== Plot ==
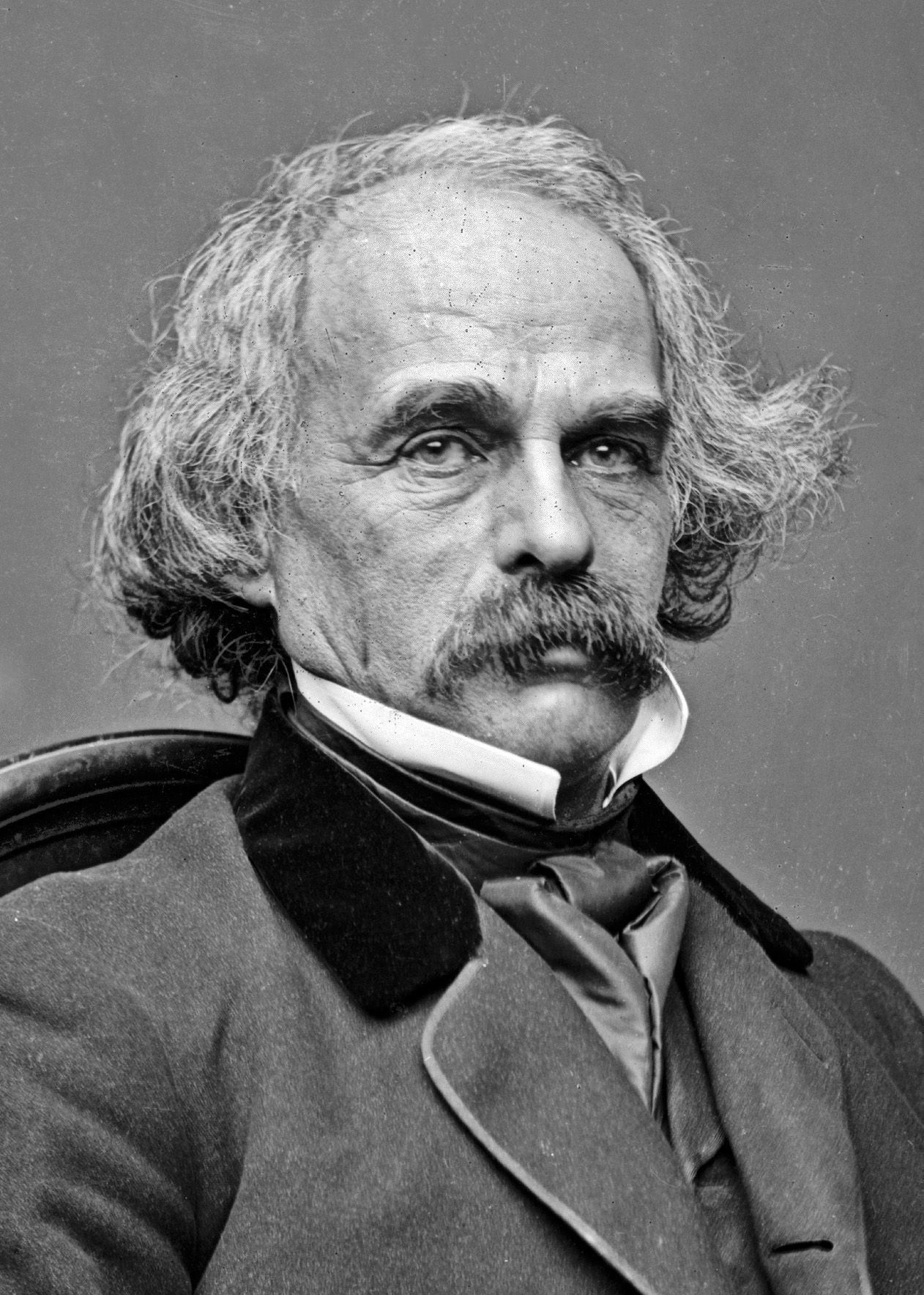

In about 1732, Robin, a young man, arrives by ferry in Boston seeking his kinsman, Major Molineux, an official in the British Colonial government, who has promised him work. However, no one in town tells him where the major is. A rich man threatens the young man with prison, and an innkeeper calls him a runaway bond-servant. At the inn, he meets a man with a face described as looking like the devil - two protrusions emanating from his forehead (like horns), eyes burning like 'fire in a cave'- who seems at the center of many evil things. Later, he runs into the man again, but this time his face is painted black and red. After blocking his path with a cudgel, he finally gets the answer that his kinsman will soon pass by. He waits at the spot on the steps of a church where he is greeted by the first polite gentleman he has met all night. Soon, the two men hear the roar of an approaching mob. At its head is the man with the red and black face - and in its midst is Major Molineux, tarred and feathered. The crowd is in an uproar, and everyone is laughing. Soon, so is young Robin, as his eyes meet those of the Major, who knows him right away. Disillusioned, the youth asks the gentleman the way back to the ferry. Yet the latter restrains him, saying that it is still possible for him to thrive without his kinsman's protection.

== Reception ==
The story was mostly unappreciated during Hawthorne's lifetime. In a 1951 essay, Q. D. Leavis described the story as, in some ways, Hawthorne's best work. Since then, it has been the focus of substantial academic attention.

== Adaptation ==
The American poet Robert Lowell adapted this story into one of the three plays in his trilogy The Old Glory, first produced by the American Place Theatre in New York City in 1964. Lowell's version of the story is a cartoonish and surreal version of the original.
