= Boston Lyceum (disambiguation) =

Boston Lyceum may refer to:

in Boston, Massachusetts

- Boston Lyceum for the Education of Young Ladies (est. 1811), school overseen by John Park
- Boston Lyceum periodical, ca.1827
- Boston Lyceum (est. 1829), civic association for popular education, lectures, debates, etc.
- Boston Lyceum, a theatre on Sudbury Street, [ca.1848-1851?]
- Boston Lyceum Bureau (est. 1868), commercial booking agency for lecturers and performers
- Lyceum Theatre, Washington Street, [ca.1890s-1900s?]
- Boston Lyceum School, [ca.1910s-1930s?]
