= The Great Stone Face =

The Great Stone Face is:

- a nickname of Buster Keaton
- a nickname of Keanu Reeves
- a nickname of Ed Sullivan
- a nickname for the Old Man of the Mountain, a New Hampshire rock formation that collapsed in 2003
- a short story by Nathaniel Hawthorne published in The Snow-Image, and Other Twice-Told Tales
- a rock formation in Millard County, Utah, purported to look like the profile of Joseph Smith.

== See also ==
- Stoneface (disambiguation)
