= Stoneface =

Stoneface may refer to:

== Geography ==
- Stoneface, Natural Research Area in the Shawnee National Forest
- Great Stone Face, rock formation in Millard County, Utah purported to look like the profile of Joseph Smith.

== Books ==
- Stoneface, novel in Deathlands series
- The Great Stone Face (Hawthorne) 1850
- Stoneface, character in The Roots of the Mountains novel by William Morris 1913
- Stoneface (comics), a Marvel Comics character

== People ==
- Stoneface, rapper with Wu-Tang Clan
- Old stone face, nickname of several people
- The Great Stone Face (disambiguation), nickname of several people
