= Caroline Ticknor =

American biographer (1866–1937)

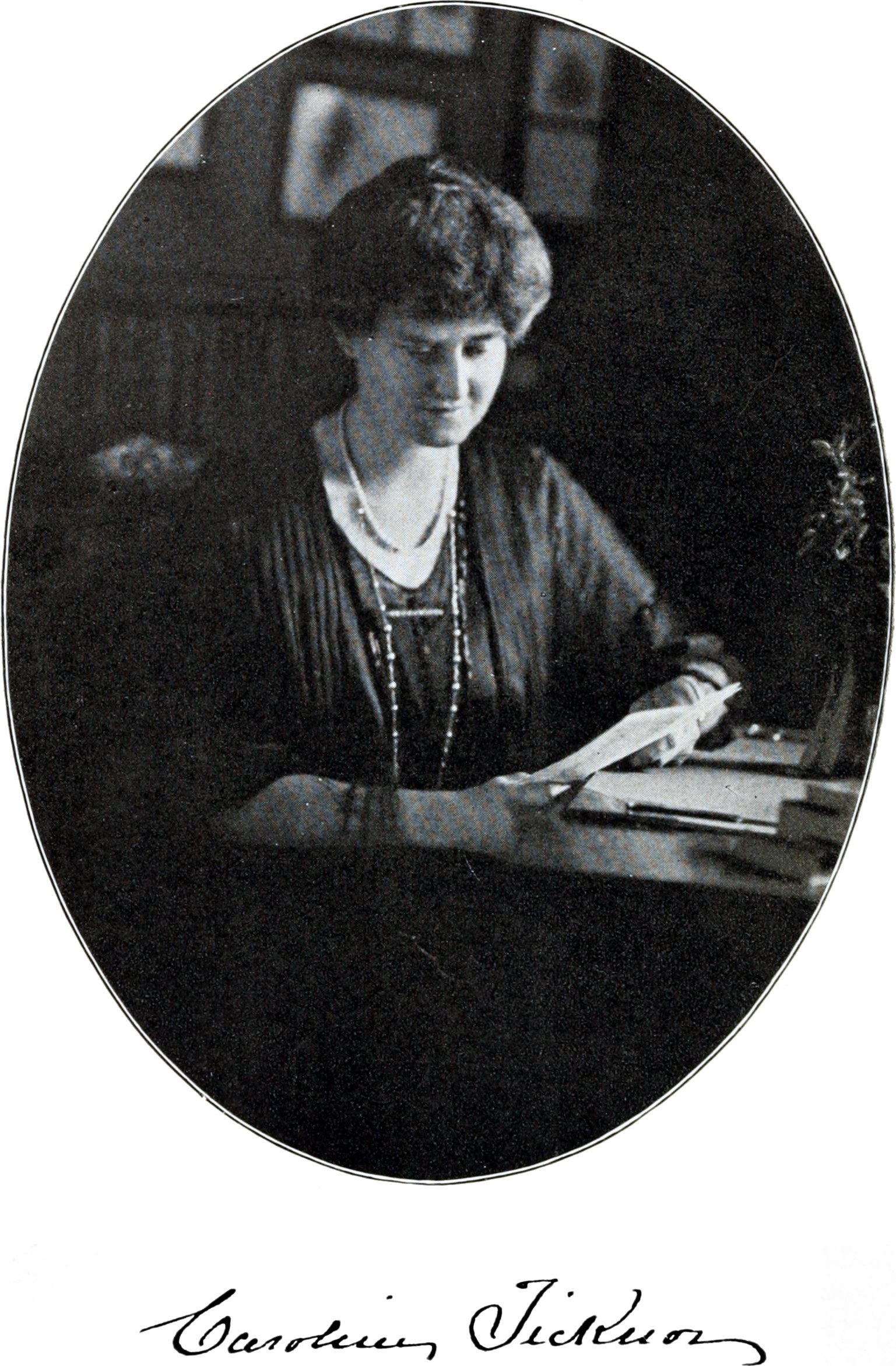
Photograph of Caroline Ticknor from her book Glimpses of Authors (1922)

Caroline Ticknor (1866–1937) was an American biographer and short story writer. She published biographies of Nathaniel Hawthorne and Abigail May Alcott Nieriker, among others.

== Personal life ==
Ticknor was born in Boston, Massachusetts in 1866. Her parents were Benjamin H. Ticknor, a bookseller, and Caroline Cushman Ticknor. Her paternal grandfather was William Ticknor, co-founder of the publishing house Ticknor and Fields.

Ticknor reportedly began writing at the age of eighteen. In 1904 Town and Country announced her engagement to Paul Van Dusen of New York, but she appears to have never married.

== Career ==
In 1898, Ticknor became an editor of the International Library of Famous Literature. In addition to books, Ticknor also published short stories in several magazines, including The Atlantic, Cosmopolitan, and New England Magazine.

=== Bibliography ===
- A hypocritical romance, and other stories (1896)
- Miss Belladonna; a child of to-day (1897)
- "The Steel-Engraving Lady and the Gibson Girl," The Atlantic (1901)
- Miss Belladonna; a social satire (1902)
- Washington's Surprising Ancestor (1908)
- editor, A poet in exile; early letters of John Hay (1910)
- Hawthorne and His Publisher (1913)
- editor, Some early letters of George William Curtis (1914)
- editor, Dr. Holmes's Boston (1915)
- Poe's Helen (1916)
- editor and compiler, New England aviators 1914–1918 : their portraits and their records (1919)
- Glimpses of Authors (1922)
- The "Old North" signal-lights, 1723–1923; or, Christmas comes to Boston (1923)
- Classic Concord, as portrayed by Emerson, Hawthorne, Thoreau and the Alcotts (1926)
- May Alcott: A Memoir (1928, about Abigail May Alcott Nieriker)

== Death ==
Ticknor died in her home in Jamaica Plain, Boston on May 11, 1937.
