= The Professor's Commencement =

1902 short story by Willa Cather

- Short story by Willa Cather
- Country: United States
- Language: English
- Genre: Short story

Publication
- Published in: New England Magazine
- Publication type: Literary magazine
- Publication date: June 1902

"The Professor's Commencement" is a short story by Willa Cather. It was first published in New England Magazine in June 1902

== Plot introduction ==
A Pittsburgh high school teacher spends his last day at work before retiring.

== Plot summary ==
Early in the morning, the Professor wakes up and reads; his sister tells him she wishes he had been more ambitious with his life. On his way to the high school where he teaches, he is unnerved by the grimness and ugliness of industrialisation. Similarly, when he asks one of the students to read aloud, he is annoyed at the noise from the nearby factory that mars the reading. He then proceeds to pick up his stuff and join his colleagues for a retirement party. However, he bungles up the speech he gives there; his sister says it doesn't matter.

== Characters ==
- Emerson, the professor. He went to Harvard and worked at a high school for thirty years.
- Miss Agatha Graves, Emerson's widowed sister.
- Mr Fairbrother, a friend of Agatha's.
- Dr Maitland, a colleague of Emerson's.

== Allusions to other works ==
- Painting is mentioned with Edward Burne-Jones, Dante Gabriel Rossetti, Jean-Baptiste-Camille Corot, Fra Angelico, and Elihu Vedder.
- Emerson mentions Aldous Huxley, Nathaniel Hawthorne's Great Stone Face, Tristan and Iseult, John Bunyan's The Holy War, Thomas Babington Macaulay, 1st Baron Macaulay, Rostam and Sohrab, and The Bible, with Mammon and Samson.
- Greek mythology is also alluded to, with Ulysses and Hector.

== Literary significance and criticism ==
It has been suggested that the story was spurred by Cather's own experience as a high school teacher in Pittsburgh in 1901.

It has been noted that the professor is more feminine, whilst his sister is more masculine.

Moreover, it has been argued that the story follows in the wake of the "pedagogic eros of the Greeks", with Emerson's affection for his "pupil with the gentle eyes and manner of a girl".
