= The Snow-Image =

"The Snow-Image: A Childish Miracle"
- Short story by Nathaniel Hawthorne
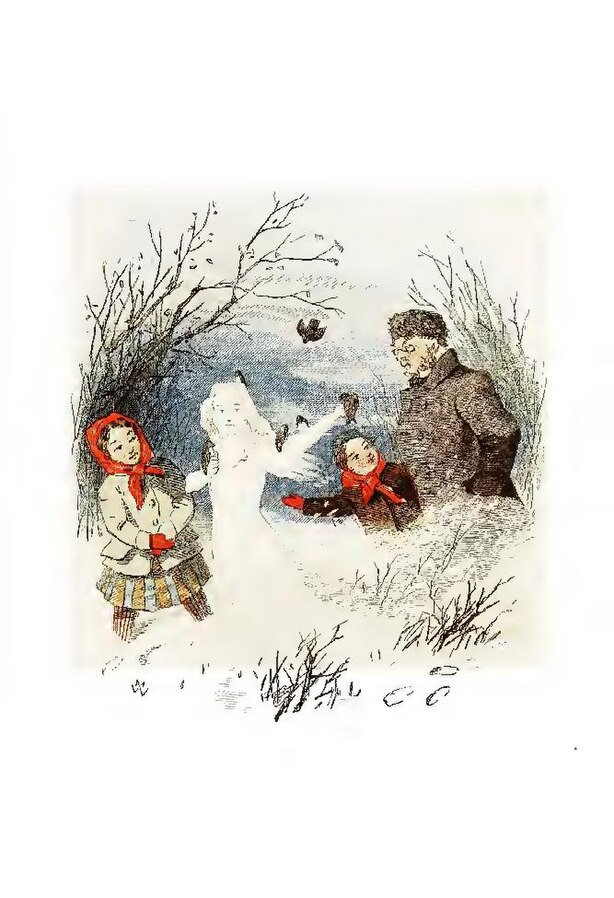
- 1864 illustration by Marcus Waterman
- Country: United States
- Language: English
- Genre: Short story

Publication
- Published in: International Monthly Magazine of Literature, Science, and Art (1st); The Snow-Image, and Other Twice-Told Tales
- Publication type: Periodical (1st); Short story collection
- Publisher: Stringer and Townsend (1st); Ticknor, Reed & Fields
- Media type: Print
- Publication date: November 1, 1850 (1st); December 1851

"The Snow-Image: A Childish Miracle" is an 1850 short story by the American writer Nathaniel Hawthorne, which gave its title to his collection The Snow-Image, and Other Twice-Told Tales, published in 1851.

== Plot ==
On a cold winter afternoon, two siblings, Violette and Peony, shape a snow figure resembling a little girl. When they kiss it, the figure comes to life, and they begin to play with her, treating her as a sister. Soon after, their father, Mr. Lindsey, a hardware dealer who is practical and unimaginative, arrives. Seeing the girl dressed only in a light white gown, he worries about her health and refuses to believe his children’s story. Convinced he is protecting her, he brings her into the house to warm her by the fire, ignoring the pleas of the children and of his wife, who, though initially doubtful, has begun to believe. Having gone out to search for the girl’s parents, Lindsey rushes back upon hearing his children’s cries: by the fireplace, all that remains is a heap of snow. Even in the face of this evidence, however, he refuses to accept the truth, insisting it is only snow carried inside on the children’s shoes, casually asking his wife to have the maid bring some towels.

== Composition and publication history ==
The story was originally conceived by Hawthorne for adults and later adapted for children. It was first published in New York in the International Monthly Magazine of Literature, Science, and Art on November 1, 1850, and the following year it was included in a volume by Ticknor and Fields in Boston titled The Snow-Image, and Other Twice-Told Tales.

== Adaptations ==
The story was adapted in 1978 in the episode “The Snow-Image Song” from the anthology anime series Manga Fairy Tales of the World.
