= The Man of Adamant =

- Short story by Nathaniel Hawthorne
- Country: United States
- Language: English
- Genre: Literary realism

Publication
- Published in: The Token and Atlantic Souvenir (1st); The Snow-Image, and Other Twice-Told Tales
- Publication type: Periodical (1st); Short story collection
- Publisher: Samuel Goodrich (1st); Ticknor, Reed & Fields
- Media type: Print
- Publication date: 1837 (1st); 1852

"The Man of Adamant" is a short story written by Nathaniel Hawthorne. It was first published in the 1837 edition of The Token and Atlantic Souvenir, edited by Samuel Griswold Goodrich. It later appeared in Hawthorne's final collection of short stories The Snow-Image, and Other Twice-Told Tales, published in 1852 by Ticknor, Reed & Fields.

== Plot ==
Richard Digby, who believes his philosophy on life is the correct one, refuses to share his ideas with anyone else. His heart ails from accretions of calculous. He leaves his home, deciding to become a hermit. In the wilderness he discovers a cave and decides to make it his new home, a place where he can meditate. Water dripping from the roof, over time, has created forms of adamant within the cave. Digby decides not to drink from a nearby fountain; instead, drinking the water dripping from the roof.

One day, the spirit of Mary Goffe appears before him, and she asks Digby to return to mankind. She says he needs mankind and the path to salvation is not within the cave. He orders her to leave him alone. She asks him to drink from the fountain and to let her read the Bible alongside him, and then his heart will be cured of its ailment. He refuses this also, and his heart stops.

Years later, a family discovers the cave. Digby still sits at the mouth of the cave, but his body has been turned to adamant. The family closes the mouth of the cave to conceal the horrible image.

== Publication history ==
"The Man of Adamant" was first published in The Token and Atlantic Souvenir in 1837. Four years later, Hawthorne sent several of his early tales to Sophia Peabody, soon to become his wife, for her opinion. She responded negatively to some of them, including "The Man of Adamant". On September 10, 1841, he responded to her criticism and mentioned, "I recollect that the Man of Adamant seemed a fine idea to me... but I failed in giving shape and substance to the vision which I saw. I don't think it can be very good." It was republished in The Snow-Image, and Other Twice-Told Tales in 1851–1852.
