= Ethan Brand =

- Short story by Nathaniel Hawthorne
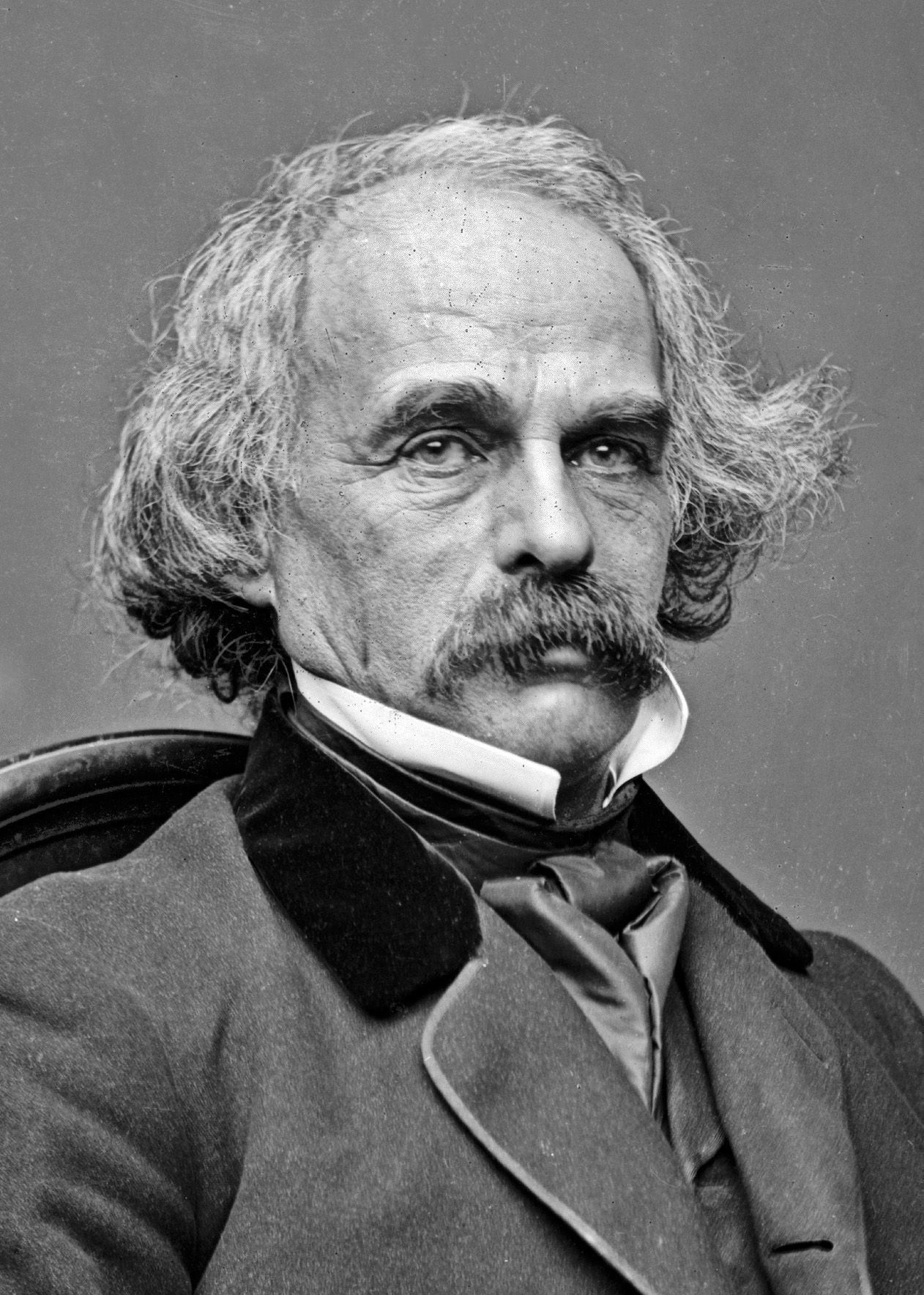
- Country: United States
- Language: English
- Genre: Short story

Publication
- Published in: The Snow-Image, and Other Twice-Told Tales
- Publication type: Short story collection
- Publisher: Ticknor, Reed & Fields
- Media type: Print
- Publication date: 1850

"Ethan Brand—A Chapter from an Abortive Romance" (originally, "The Unpardonable Sin") is a short story written by Nathaniel Hawthorne in 1850 and first published by Ticknor, Reed, and Fields in 1852 in The Snow-Image, and Other Twice-Told Tales, the author's final collection of short stories. Hawthorne originally planned a lengthy work about Brand, but completed only this piece. Hawthorne's inspiration was a lime kiln he saw burning while climbing Mount Greylock.

== Plot ==
A lime-burner named Bartram and his son hear a disturbing roar of laughter echo through the twilight in the hills. Soon thereafter, Ethan Brand arrives at the lime kiln and is questioned by Bartram. Brand says that he used to keep the very same kiln before he went off in search of the "unpardonable sin", which he claims to have found. When asked what the unpardonable sin is, Brand replies, “It is a sin that grew within my own breast. A sin that grew nowhere else! The sin of an intellect that triumphed over the sense of brotherhood with man and reverence for God, and sacrificed everything to its own mighty claims! The only sin that deserves a recompense of immortal agony! Freely, were it to do again, would I incur the guilt. Unshrinkingly I accept the retribution!" Bartram does not understand, and mutters to himself that Brand is a mad man.

A group of townspeople arrive at the scene to gawk at Brand. In the course of his interactions with them, Brand is disturbed by their coarse behavior and begins to doubt whether he really found the unpardonable sin. When the townspeople compare Brand to another so called "madman" named Humphrey, Brand recalls a victim of his search, Esther (Humphrey's daughter), who left the province to become a circus performer and who subsequently became the subject of Brand's psychological experiment. Brand remembers that the research, "wasted, absorbed, and perhaps annihilated her soul, in the process," and so he is again convinced that he found the "unpardonable sin".

The Wandering Jew, carrying a diorama on his back, joins the assembled near the kiln after dusk. The children of the town flock to the Jew to see his images. When Brand looks into the diorama, he sees something that disturbs him. He orders the Jew to get into the furnace or leave.

A village dog chases his own tail. The villagers head home, and Brand is left with Bartram and his son. Brand offers to tend the fire overnight, so Bartram and the boy go home.

Brand decides that his "task is done, and well done," and he climbs into the furnace to his death. Bartram and his son, after a night of fitful sleep and dreams full of maniacal laughter, awake to find the landscape populated by heavenly atmospheric phenomena. When they realize that Brand is gone, and that "the sky and the mountains all seem glad of it," they look into the lime kiln and find Brand's skeleton, transformed into lime. Inside the rib cage is a chunk of lime in the shape of a human heart. Bartram pokes the fragile artifacts and they crumble to dust.

== Composition and publication history ==
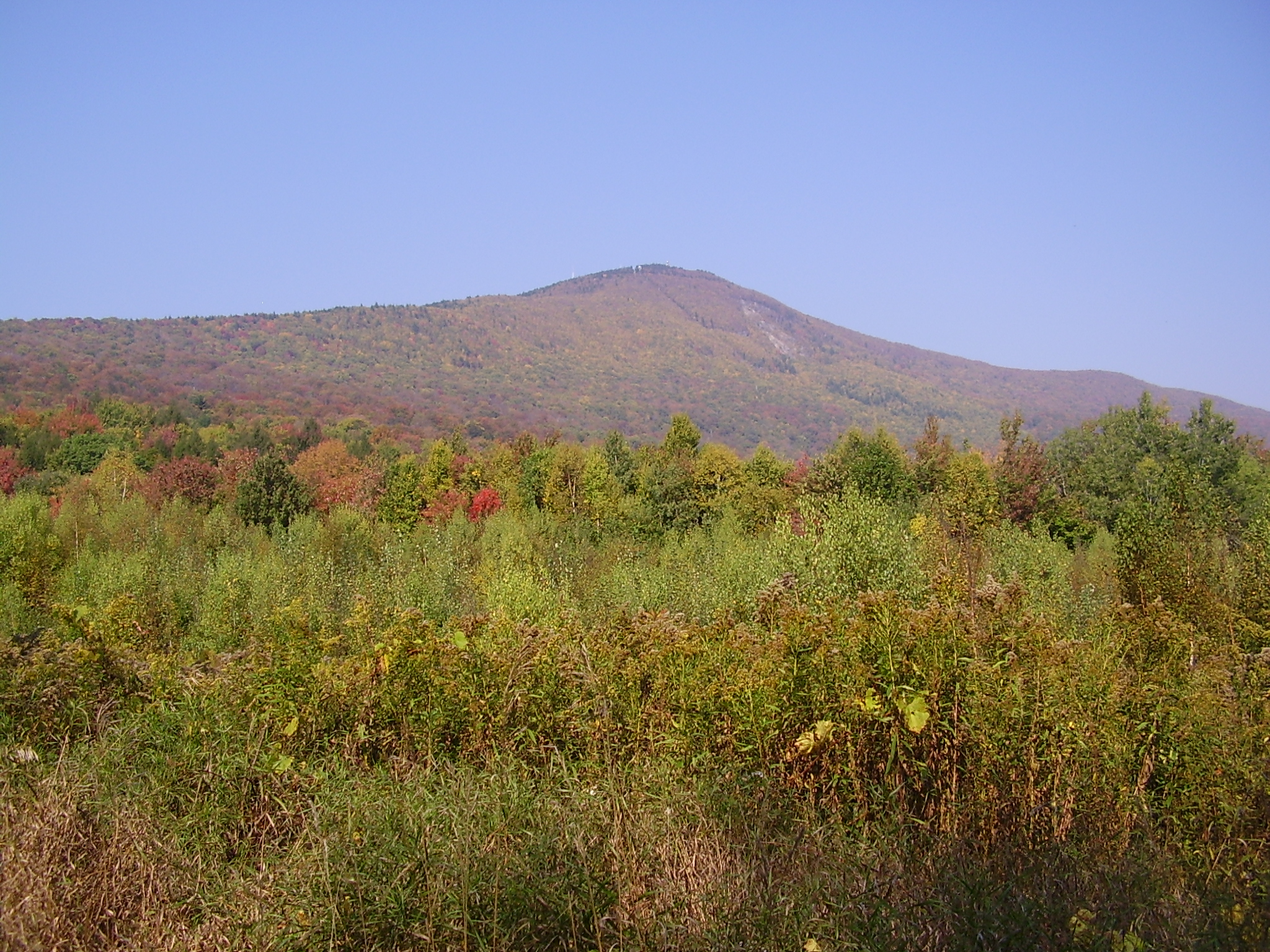
Mount Greylock, 2007

In the summer of 1838, Hawthorne had visited North Adams, Massachusetts and climbed Mount Greylock several times. His experiences here, especially a walk he took at midnight where he saw a burning lime kiln, inspired this story, originally titled "The Unpardonable Sin". Hawthorne had not written tales since 1844 when he wrote "Ethan Brand" in the winter of 1848–1849. He admitted he had difficulty writing it. He wrote:

I have wrenched and torn an idea out of my miserable brain, or rather, the fragment of an idea, like a tooth ill-drawn and leaving the roots to torture me.

Hawthorne had planned a lengthy tale about Brand's life and his travels in search of the "Unpardonable Sin" but published only this, most of which would have formed the climactic chapter.

== Adaptations ==
In 1945, the story was adapted to the syndicated radio program The Weird Circle as "The Heart of Ethan Brand".
