= Francis Dickens =

Fifth child of Charles Dickens (1844–1886)

- Francis Jeffrey Dickens as an Inspector in the Canadian; North-West Mounted Police (1884)

Personal details
- Born: 15 January 1844 London, England
- Died: 11 June 1886 (aged 42) Moline, Illinois
- Relations: Six brothers and three sisters
- Parent(s): Charles Dickens; Catherine Dickens

Francis Jeffrey Dickens (15 January 1844 – 11 June 1886) was the third son and fifth child of Victorian English novelist Charles Dickens and his wife Catherine Dickens née Hogarth.

== Early life and career ==
Francis Dickens was nicknamed "Chickenstalker" by his father after the character Mrs. Chickenstalker in the Christmas book that he was writing at the time of Francis's birth, The Chimes; however he came to be called Frank by those who knew him. He was born in England and went to school in Germany to train to become a medical doctor. Giving up this ambition, he obtained a commission in the Bengal Mounted Police and served in India for seven years.

Following his father's death in 1870 he inherited some money, but he soon went through this, and his aunt, Georgina Hogarth (Catherine Dickens's sister) used her influence with family friend Lord Dufferin, then Governor General of Canada, to get Francis Dickens a commission in the North-West Mounted Police.

Dickens joined the North-West Mounted Police as a Sub Inspector in Canada in 1874 shortly after the March West which brought the original police force of 300 members to the modern provinces of Saskatchewan and Alberta. He would remain in the force 12 years, serving at Fort Walsh, Fort Macleod and Fort Pitt, getting promoted to Inspector in 1880.

== The Battle of Fort Pitt, 1885 ==
During the North-West Rebellion of 1885, Francis Dickens was in charge of the defence of Fort Pitt on the North Saskatchewan River. Francis Dickens's diary written during his charge at Fort Pitt, though very brief, is an important document of the events of the siege that led to the evacuation of the mounted police from the fort. On his website, David J. Carter describes the events at Fort Pitt.

This site [Frog Lake, following Cree attacks on priests and Hudson's Bay Company employees and family members] was 35 miles northwest of Fort Pitt. Dickens sent out three scouts to reconnoitre. When they returned they were attacked by Cree warriors; one escaped unharmed, one was wounded – played dead then crawled to the 'fort', the other Constable Cowan was killed within sight of Fort Pitt. Then the warrior cut out young Cowan's heart and ate a piece of it before the horrified defenders of the fort. The NWMP detachment were outnumbered and outgunned 200 to 20. Negotiations led to the civilians agreeing to become prisoners of the Cree and Big Bear. The Chief gave Dickens and his men a short time to abandon the fort. This they did, and travelled amongst the ice pans in a leaky scow. Scouts from Fort Battleford reported that everyone at Fort Pitt had been massacred; however, after six days on the river Dickens and his men arrived at Battleford and received a hero's welcome.

== Discharge and death ==
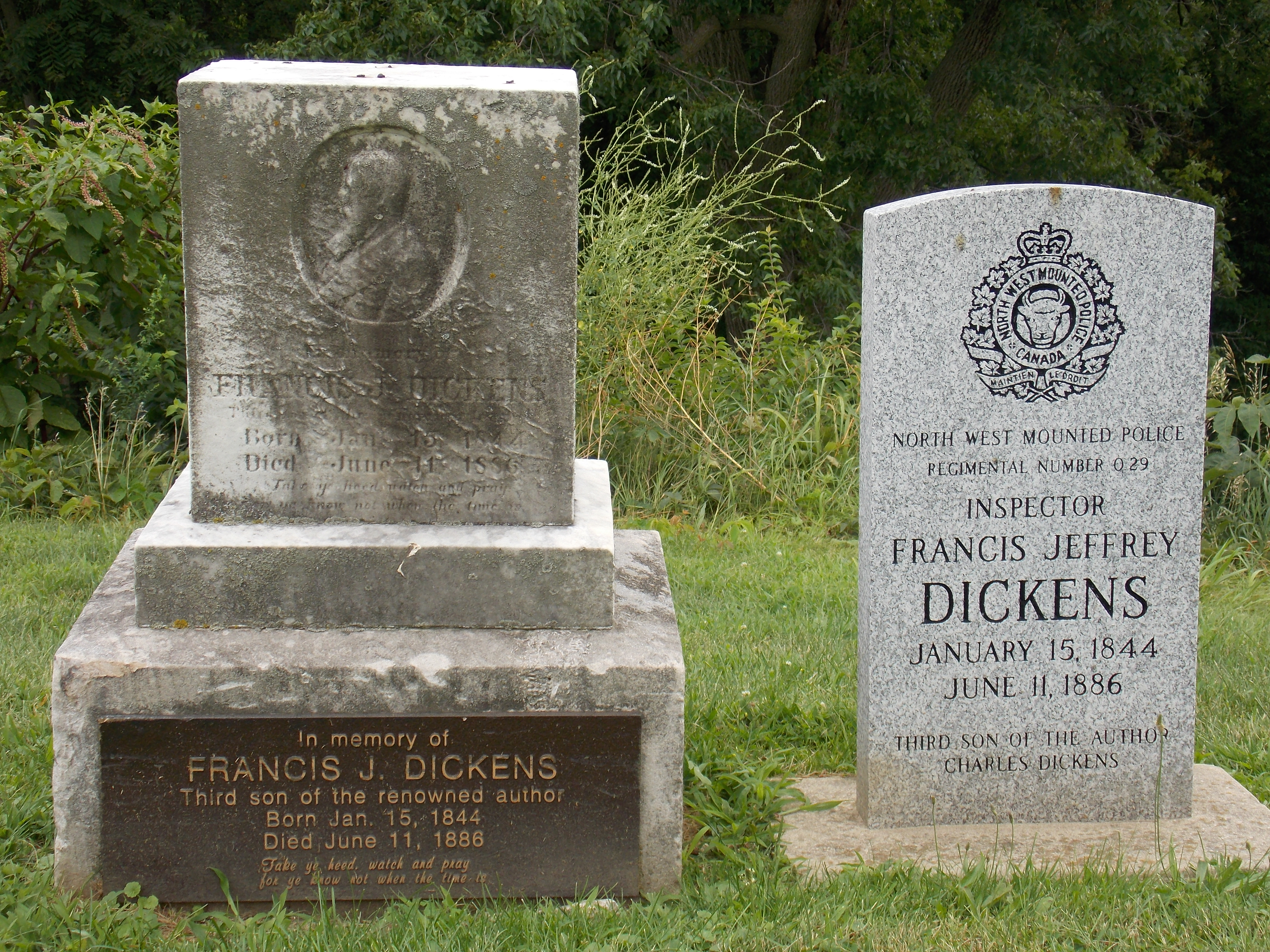
Dickens's grave in Riverside Cemetery in Moline, Illinois

Following his discharge from the Mounted Police in 1886 (for reasons of ill health—he was becoming increasingly hard of hearing among other infirmities) Frank was going to embark on a series of lecture talks in the U.S. (as his father had successfully done), but died of a heart attack at a friend's house in Moline, Illinois, the night of his first speech. He was 42 years old.

== Character reputation ==
Contemporary portrayals of Francis Dickens (such as the character Inspector Dicken in the 1886 romantic novel Annette, the Métis Spy), conformed to a conventional heroic type, reflecting the dominant view of the Rebellion held by (English-speaking) Eastern Canada. However, some of his superiors in the Mounted Police held unfavourable opinions about his overall competence, echoing his father Charles Dickens, who wrote in a letter to his friend on being asked by his son for three hundred pounds, a horse and a gun to set himself up as a gentleman farmer in the colonies, that the consequence of the first is that he would be robbed of it, the second, that it would throw him, and the third, that he would shoot his own head off.

In histories of the Mounted Police, Francis Dickens is described as a tragic character, struggling to live in the shadow of his great father. Charges against him include drunkenness, laziness and recklessness. David Carter in the third chapter of his book questions the evidence that these claims are based on. An article in a special RCMP issue of the Canadian history magazine The Beaver called "Francis J. Dickens, An Ordinary Officer" gives a balanced picture, pointing out his twelve years of service during which time many men in the fledgling police force on the plains deserted or were discharged for misconduct. Others have gone so far as to say that he was partly responsible for the deterioration in relations between the NWMP and the Blackfoot in the 1880s.

== Francis Dickens in fiction ==
The events surrounding Frog Lake and the battle of Fort Pitt are treated in The Temptations of Big Bear (1973) by Rudy Wiebe. In recent decades, Francis Dickens has been depicted as a comic figure. In W. G. Grace's Last Case (1984), by William Rushton, in a fantastic plot that includes fictional characters like Jekyll and Hyde and Dr. Watson, Francis Dickens encounters Apaches and (anachronistically) meets the famed cricketer of the title during the latter's team's 1872 North American tour.

Francis Dickens was the subject of a comic novel by humorist Eric Nicol, Dickens of the Mounted (1989). The book is a series of fictional letters, a mock document purporting to be a record of Dickens's correspondence spanning his twelve years in Canada, only "edited" by Nicol. It is still frequently mistaken for non-fiction. In 2007 a Fringe festival play called Dickens of the Mounted based on Nicol's novel toured several Canadian cities.

Frank Dickens also appears in the science fiction novel that deals with the NWMP in an alternative history, The Apparition Trail (2004) by Lisa Smedman.

In the novels The Winnipeg Wolf and The Search for Spade belonging to the "Inspector Bucket NWMP" series by Jeremy Allen the leading character, Francis Bucket, is based on Francis Dickens.

He is played by Joe Prospero in the TV mini-series Hans Christian Andersen: My Life as a Fairytale.

Francis Dickens is a character in Matthew Pearl's 2009 novel, The Last Dickens. Dickens also appears in Bill Gallaher's The Frog Lake Massacre (2008).

Tanis Stony Dickens, played by Darla Contois, the fictional daughter of Francis and an Indigenous Canadian woman, says in episode 3 of season 18 "What the Dickens?!" (October 14, 2024) of the Canadian television period detective series Murdoch Mysteries that Charles gave his pocket watch to Francis because Francis was a wastrel who was always late.

== See also ==
- Dickens family
- Fort Pitt Provincial Park

== Sources ==
The Diary of Francis Dickens, edited by Vernon LaChance, Kingston Jackson Press, 1930
"Francis Jeffrey Dickens", The Canadian Encyclopedia, (entry by John Evans)
Eric Nicol, Dickens of the Mounted: The Astounding Long-lost Letters of Inspector F. Dickens NWMP 1874–1886. (1989) McClelland & Stewart
"Francis J. Dickens, An Ordinary Officer", Beaver Vol.78, No.3 June/July 1998
David J. Carter Inspector F.J. Dickens: "The Christmas Carol baby" (1998)
