= The Weird Circle =

Radio drama series

- Genre: Drama and suspense
- Running time: 30 minutes
- Country of origin: United States
- Language: English
- Syndicates: Mutual Broadcasting System; NBC Red Network; ABC Blue Network
- Starring: Gladys Thornton; Audrey Totter, Chester Stratton; Eleanor Audley, Arnold Moss, Lawson Zerbe; Walter Vaughn; Regis Joyce; Fred Barron
- Original release: July 8, 1943 – 1945
- No. of episodes: 78

The Weird Circle is a syndicated radio drama series produced in New York and originally broadcast between 1943 and 1945.

== Production background ==
The series was a Ziv Production, produced at RCA's New York studios and licensed by the Mutual Broadcasting System, and later, NBC's Red Network. It lasted two seasons, 39 shows each (78 total) consisting mostly of radio adaptations of classic horror or supernatural stories written by authors such as Edgar Allan Poe, Robert Louis Stevenson and Charles Dickens. A few scripts were written specifically for the series. The production values were modest and The Weird Circle featured very little music.

== Series opening/closing ==
=== Standard opening ===
(SFX: Running water, perhaps a sea surf. Bell tolls)

Old Man: "In this cave by the restless sea, we are met to call from out of the past, stories strange and weird. Bell keeper, toll the bell, so that all may know that we are gathered again in The Weird Circle."

=== Alternate opening ===
Announcer: "Out of the past, phantoms from a world gone by speak again the immortal tale (episode title)."

=== Standard closing ===
Host: "From the time worn pages of the past, we have recalled, (episode title). Bell Keeper, toll the bell!"

(SFX: Bell tolls)

== List of episodes ==
Stories dramatized in The Weird Circle came largely from public-domain 19th-century (or earlier) sources. Longer works were heavily abridged, keeping only the bare outline of the weird elements of the story. Short works were expanded and rewritten, often with additional characters and a romantic element added. In some cases, the rewriting was so extensive that the original story is almost unrecognizable save for some character names.

#	Title	First broadcast	Original author (source work)
1	The Fall of the House of Usher	08/29/1943	Edgar Allan Poe
2	The House and the Mind	09/05/1943	Edward George Bulwer-Lytton ("The Haunted and the Haunters; Or, The House and the Brain")
3	The Vendetta	09/12/1943	Honoré de Balzac (La Vendetta)
4	The Narrative of Arthur Gordon Pym	09/19/1943	Edgar Allan Poe
5	Declared Insane	09/26/1943	Honoré de Balzac ("L'Interdiction")
6	A Terribly Strange Bed	10/03/1943	Wilkie Collins
7	What Was It? A Mystery	10/10/1943	Fitz James O'Brien
8	The Knightsbridge Mystery	10/17/1943	Charles Reade
9	The Horla	10/24/1943	Guy de Maupassant ("Le Horla")
10	William Wilson	10/31/1943	Edgar Allan Poe
11	Passion in the Desert	11/07/1943	Honoré de Balzac ("Une passion dans le désert")
12	Mateo Falcone	11/14/1943	Prosper Mérimée
13	The Man Without a Country	11/21/1943	Edward Everett Hale
14	Doctor Manette’s Manuscript	11/28/1943	Charles Dickens (from A Tale of Two Cities)
15	The Great Plague	12/05/1943	Thomas Hood ("A Tale of the Great Plague")
16	The Expectations of an Heir	12/12/1943	Samuel Johnson (Note: Source work not confirmed.)
17	The Hand	12/19/1943	Guy de Maupassant (La Main (Maupassant))
18	Jane Eyre	12/26/1943	Charlotte Brontë
19	The Murders in the Rue Morgue	01/02/1944	Edgar Allan Poe
20	The Lifted Veil	01/09/1944	George Eliot
21	The 4:15 Express	01/16/1944	Amelia Edwards ("The Four Fifteen Express")
22	A Terrible Night	01/23/1944	Fitz James O'Brien
23	The Tell-Tale Heart	01/30/1944	Edgar Allan Poe
24	The Niche of Doom	02/06/1944	Honoré de Balzac ("La Grande Bretèche")
25	The Heart of Ethan Brand	02/13/1944	Nathaniel Hawthorne ("Ethan Brand")
26	Frankenstein	02/20/1944	Mary Shelley
27	The Feast of Redgauntlet	02/27/1944	Sir Walter Scott ("Wandering Willie's Tale" from Redgauntlet)
28	Murder of the Little Pig	03/05/1944	Émile Gaboriau
29	The Specter of Tappington	03/12/1944	Richard Barham (from The Ingoldsby Legends)
30	Strange Judgment	03/19/1944	
31	Wuthering Heights	03/26/1944	Emily Brontë
32	The Curse of the Mantle	04/02/1944	Nathaniel Hawthorne ("Lady Eleanore's Mantle")
33	The Cask of Amontillado	04/09/1944	Edgar Allan Poe
34	The Rope of Hair	04/16/1944	Guy de Maupassant ("Apparition")
35	Falkland	04/23/1944	Edward George Bulwer-Lytton
36	The Trial for Murder	04/30/1944	Charles Dickens & Charles Allston Collins
37	Werewolf	05/07/1944	Frederick Marryat ("The White Wolf of the Hartz Mountains" from The Phantom Ship)
38	The Old Nurse’s Story	05/14/1944	Elizabeth Cleghorn Gaskell
39	The Middle Toe of the Right Foot	05/28/1944	Ambrose Bierce
40	The Dream Woman	09/04/1944	Wilkie Collins
41	The Phantom Picture	09/10/1944	Washington Irving ("The Adventure of the Young Italian" from Tales of a Traveller, Part I: Strange Stories by a Nervous Gentleman)
42	The Ghost's Touch	09/17/1944	Wilkie Collins
43	The Bell Tower	09/24/1944	Herman Melville (from The Piazza Tales)
44	The Evil Eye	10/01/1944	Théophile Gautier (Jettatura translated as The Evil Eye)
45	The Mark of the Plague	10/08/1944	Daniel Defoe (from A Journal of the Plague Year)
46	The Queer Client	10/15/1944	Charles Dickens (The Pickwick Papers, Chapter XXI)
47	The Burial of Roger Malvin	10/22/1944	Nathaniel Hawthorne ("Roger Malvin's Burial")
48	The Fatal Love Potion	10/29/1944	Edward George Bulwer-Lytton (The Last Days of Pompeii)
49	Mad Monkton	11/05/1944	Wilkie Collins
50	The Return	11/12/1944	Edgar Allan Poe ("Ligeia")
51	The Executioner	11/19/1944	Honoré de Balzac ("El Verdugo")
52	Rappaccini's Daughter	11/26/1944	Nathaniel Hawthorne
53	The Wooden Ghost	12/03/1944	Joseph Sheridan Le Fanu ("Strange Event in the Life of Schalken the Painter" from The Purcell Papers)
54	The Last Day of a Condemned Man	12/10/1944	Victor Hugo ("Le Dernier jour d'un condamné")
55	The Warning	12/17/1944	R. P. Gilles
56	The Doll	12/24/1944	Fitz James O'Brien ("The Wondersmith")
57	The Diamond Lens	12/31/1944	Fitz James O'Brien
58	The History of Dr. John Faust	01/07/1945	Christopher Marlowe (The Tragical History of Doctor Faustus) (Note: Probably. The legend of Faust is centuries old and several authors have rewritten it.)
59	The Duel Without Honor	01/14/1945	Alexandre Dumas ("Zodomirsky’s Duel")
60	The Specter Bride	01/21/1945	William Harrison Ainsworth
61	The Tapestry Horse	01/28/1945	Edgar Allan Poe ("Metzengerstein")
62	The River Man	02/04/1945	
63	The Ancient Mariner	02/11/1945	Samuel Taylor Coleridge ("The Rime of the Ancient Mariner")
64	The Oblong Box	02/18/1945	Edgar Allan Poe
65	The Mysterious Bride	02/25/1945	James Hogg
66	The Thing in the Tunnel	03/04/1945	Charles Dickens ("The Signal-Man")
67	The Moonstone	03/11/1945	Wilkie Collins
68	The Pistol Shot	03/18/1945	Prosper Mérimée
69	The Possessive Dead	03/25/1945	Théophile Gautier ("Le Pied de momie" translated as "The Mummy's Foot")
70	The Goblet	04/01/1945	Ludwig Tieck ("Der Pokal" translated as "The Goblet" or "The Mysterious Cup")
71	The Case of Monsieur Valdemar	04/08/1945	Edgar Allan Poe ("The Facts in the Case of M. Valdemar")
72	The Shadow	04/15/1945	Hans Christian Andersen
73	The Bride of Death	04/22/1945	
74	Dr. Jekyll and Mr. Hyde	04/29/1945	Robert Louis Stevenson ("Strange Case of Dr. Jekyll and Mr. Hyde")
75	The Red Hand	05/06/1945	
76	The Haunted Hotel	05/13/1945	Wilkie Collins
77	Markheim	05/20/1945	Robert Louis Stevenson
78	The Black Parchment	05/27/1945	
