= William Ticknor =

American publisher (1810–1864)

William Davis Ticknor
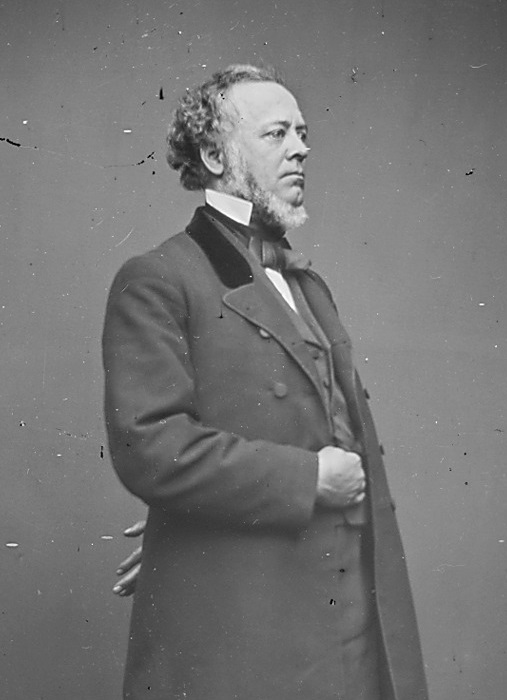
- Ticknor, c. 1860–1865
- Born: August 6, 1810; Lebanon, New Hampshire, US
- Died: April 10, 1864 (aged 53); Philadelphia, Pennsylvania, US
- Occupation: Publisher
- Spouse: Emeline Staniford Holt (m. 1832)

William Davis Ticknor I (August 6, 1810 – April 10, 1864) was an American publisher in Boston, Massachusetts, USA, and a founder of the publishing house Ticknor and Fields.

== Life and work ==
William Davis Ticknor was born on August 6, 1810, on the outskirts of Lebanon, New Hampshire, the oldest boy of nine brothers and sisters. His parents, William and Betsey (Ellis) Ticknor, were prosperous farmers. His cousin was the famous writer and historian George Ticknor, and his granddaughter Caroline Ticknor was a biographer and short story writer. As a boy, Ticknor worked on the family farm during the summers and attended the district school during the winters. In 1827 at age seventeen he left home and went to Boston.

He was first employed in the brokerage house of his uncle Benjamin. When his uncle died a few years later he was offered a position at the Columbian Bank, a position he held for a year or two. In 1832 he went into partnership with John Allen forming the publishing house of Allen and Ticknor which operated out of the Old Corner Bookstore. The following year Allen withdrew and Ticknor carried on the house under the name William D. Ticknor and Company, which would remain the legal name of the firm until his death. In 1837 he published the national monthly American Magazine of Useful and Entertaining Knowledge.

On December 25, 1832, he married Emeline Staniford Holt. They had seven children together; only five survived into adulthood. Their three sons Howard Malcom, Benjamin Holt and Thomas Baldwin Ticknor all graduated from Harvard and entered into their father's firm. During the Civil War, Benjamin Holt Ticknor enlisted in the Forty-Fifth Regiment of Massachusetts Volunteers and was commissioned as second lieutenant of Company G until May 1863. He was commissioned as second lieutenant in the Second Massachusetts Heavy Artillery. He was later commissioned as captain of Company E and was in command of the recruiting camp at Readville, Massachusetts. He resigned from service shortly after his father's death.

In 1845, the imprint of the firm was changed to Ticknor, Reed and Fields, after John Reed and James T. Fields were admitted as partners. The company continued under this imprint until 1854, when John Reed withdrew and the name was changed to the well-known Ticknor and Fields.

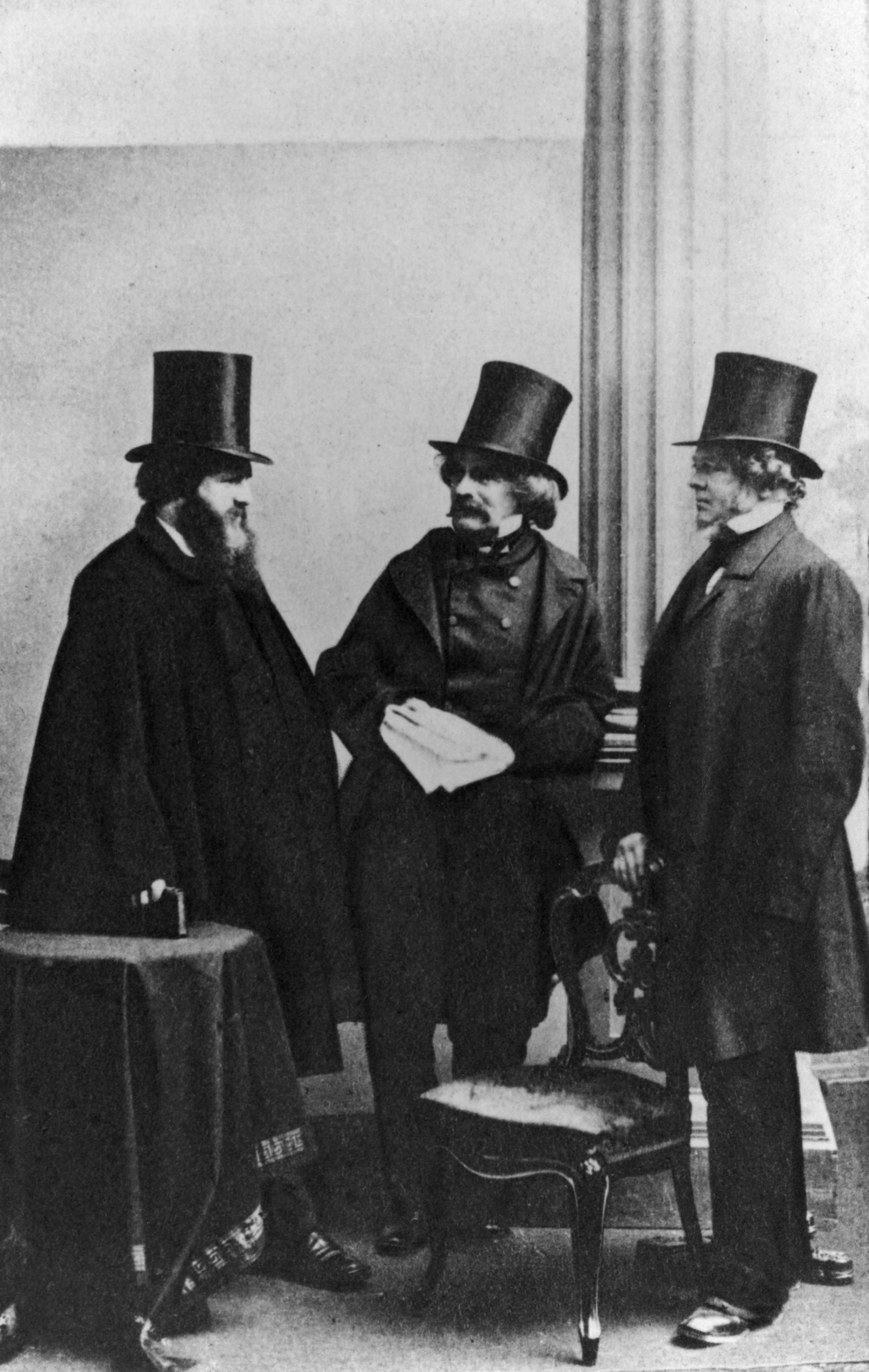
James T. Fields, Nathaniel Hawthorne, and Ticknor

With the widely varying but well matched talents of the two partners, Ticknor and Fields grew to become one of the leading publishing houses in the 19th century. Ticknor was the first American publisher to pay foreign authors for the rights to their works, beginning with a check to Alfred Tennyson in 1842. From the Old Corner Book Store, Ticknor and Fields published the works of Horatio Alger, Lydia Maria Child, Charles Dickens, Ralph Waldo Emerson, Nathaniel Hawthorne, Oliver Wendell Holmes, Henry Wadsworth Longfellow, James Russell Lowell, Harriet Beecher Stowe, Tennyson, Henry David Thoreau, Mark Twain, and John Greenleaf Whittier. The firm also published the Atlantic Monthly, Our Young Folks, and the North American Review.

During his life, Ticknor was very involved with the Baptist church. He was a director of the Boston Lyceum, treasurer of the American Institute of Instruction, a trustee of the Perkins Institute, and a leading member of the School Committee. He was also a resident member of the New England Historic Genealogical Society. Shortly after the firm contracted for Hawthorne's The Scarlet Letter, Ticknor became a close friend and advisor to Hawthorne.

=== Death ===
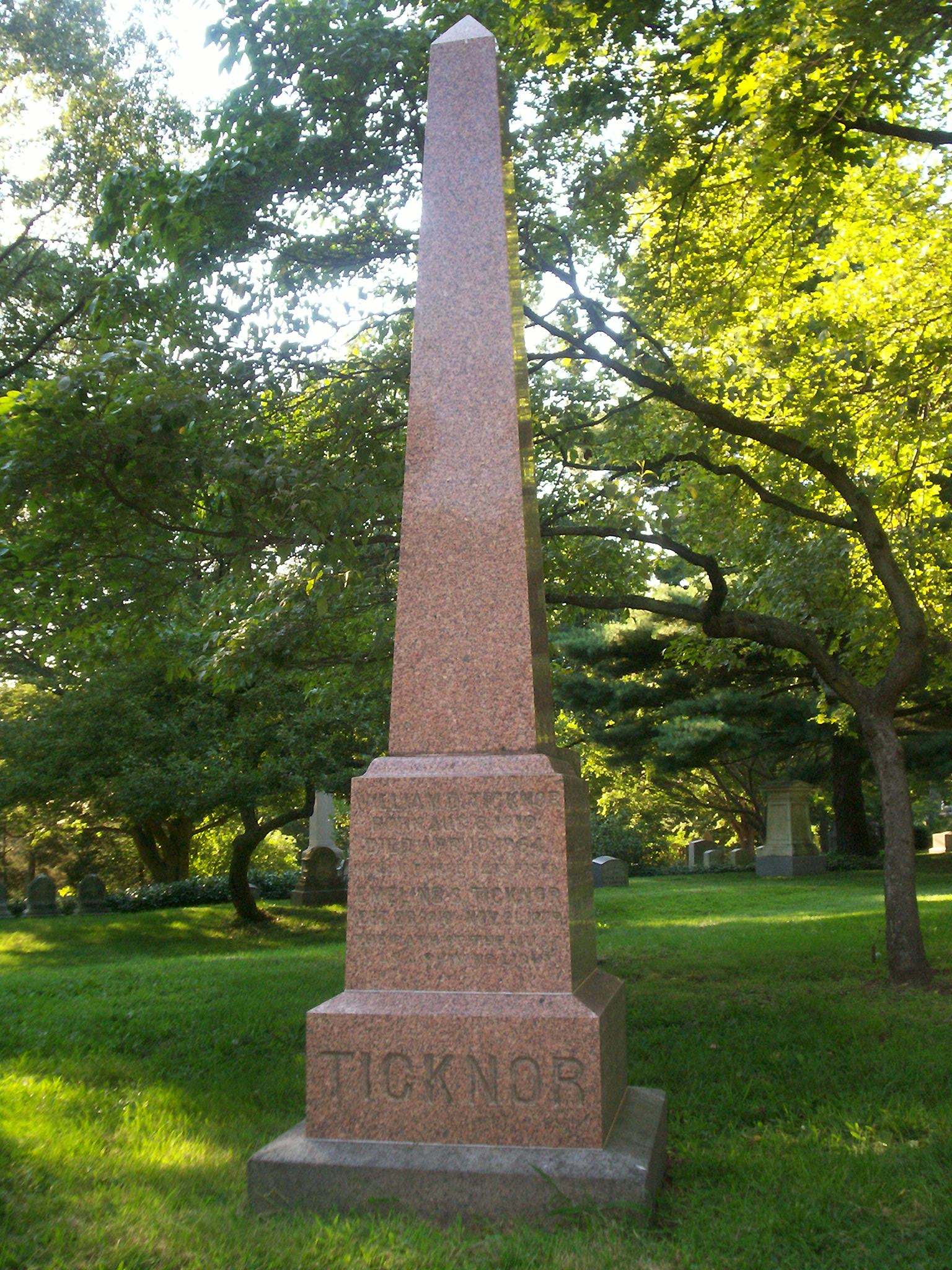
Grave of William Ticknor at Mount Auburn Cemetery in Cambridge, Massachusetts

In the spring of 1864, Hawthorne's health was failing. Both Ticknor and Sophia Hawthorne insisted on a restorative health trip. During their trip, Ticknor's health suddenly failed. He caught what he assumed was a cold before leaving Boston, and Hawthorne later wrote home that his friend had eaten bad oysters. By the time they reached New York, his illness was determined to be pneumonia.

Ticknor was more concerned about Hawthorne, writing to Sophia: "You will be glad to hear that your patient continues to improve." In Philadelphia, the duo visited Fairmount Park and Ticknor offered Hawthorne his jacket for warmth before they returned to the Continental Hotel. Hawthorne wrote to Fields that "our friend Ticknor is suffering under a billious attack... He had previously seemed uncomfortable, but not to an alarming degree." A physician offered various medicines, but Ticknor died on the morning of April 10, 1864, aged 53. George William Childs arrived shortly after and accompanied the distraught and grieving Hawthorne back to Boston. The sudden loss of Ticknor was devastating to the already failing health of Hawthorne, who died about a month later on May 19. Ticknor was buried at Mount Auburn Cemetery; the distinguished of both literary and business circles came to pay their final tribute.
