= Boston Lyceum =

The Boston Lyceum (est.1829) of Boston, Massachusetts was a civic association dedicated to popular education in the form of "lectures, discussions, ... declamation," and writing contests. It began "in Chauncy Hall on 25 June 1829 (197 years ago). On 13 August 1829 it formed its classes and made provisions for lectures and debates." Annual members' "exhibitions" of elocution took place in various venues around town, such as the Masonic Temple (1832), Tremont Hall (1839) and the Odeon (1840). Leaders included George Bancroft, Timothy Claxton, James T. Fields, Abbott Lawrence, William H. Prescott, William D. Ticknor, and Amasa Walker. Among the many lecturers: Nehemiah Adams, J. A. Bolles, David Paul Brown, Rufus Choate, William M. Cornell, C. C. Emerson, James Pollard Espy, Edward Everett, Dr. Grigg, George S. Hillard, Oliver Wendell Holmes, Dr. C. T. Jackson, N. Jones, Rev. John Pierpont, Edgar Allan Poe, John Osborne Sargent, William H. Simmons, Charles Sumner, B. B. Thatcher, Henry Theodore Tuckerman, Amasa Walker, and E.M.P. Wells.

== Debates ==
Some of the questions formally debated by members:

- 1832: "Can businessmen possessing the advantages afforded by Lyceums and similar associations, qualify themselves as well for the highest trusts and most responsible duties of public stations, as professional men of scientific and literary attainments?"
- 1834: "Does the multiplicity of societies at the present day, on the whole, impede individual action?"
- 1835: "Do moral or physical causes have the greatest influence on determining national character?"

== See also ==
- Lyceum movement
- Josiah Holbrook
