= The Last Dickens =

2009 novel by Matthew Pearl

- First edition
- Author: Matthew Pearl
- Language: English
- Genre: Mystery novel
- Publisher: Random House
- Publication date: 2009
- Publication place: United States
- Media type: Hardcover (first edition)
- Pages: 400 pp (first edition hardcover)
- ISBN: 1-4000-6656-5
- OCLC: 268547496
- Preceded by: The Poe Shadow
- Followed by: The Technologists

The Last Dickens is a novel by Matthew Pearl published by Random House. It is a work of historical and literary fiction. The novel is a Washington Post Critics' Pick. It contains some characters from The Dante Club.

== Plot summary ==
The novel is set in the United States, England, and India in 1867 and 1870. When news of Charles Dickens’s untimely death reaches the office of his struggling American publisher, Fields & Osgood, partner James R. Osgood sends his trusted clerk Daniel Sand to await Dickens's unfinished last novel – The Mystery of Edwin Drood.

But when Daniel's body is discovered by the docks and the manuscript is nowhere to be found, Osgood must embark on a transatlantic quest to unearth the novel that will save his venerable business and reveal Daniel's killer. Danger and intrigue abound on the journey, for which Osgood has chosen Rebecca Sand, Daniel's older sister, to help clear her brother's name and achieve their singular mission. As they attempt to uncover Dickens's final mystery, Osgood and Rebecca find themselves racing the clock through a dangerous web of literary lions and drug dealers, sadistic thugs and blue bloods, and competing members of the inner circle. They soon realize that understanding Dickens's lost ending is a matter of life and death, and the hidden key to stopping a murderous mastermind.

The novel also includes interspersed sections about Charles Dickens's 1867 reading tour of the United States and Francis Dickens's role as a mounted policeman in Bengal, India. One of the characters carries a walking stick with a qilin (kylin) head attached.

== See also ==
- The Mystery of Edwin Drood
- Francis Dickens
- Qilin in popular culture
