= James T. Fields =

American journalist (1817–1881)

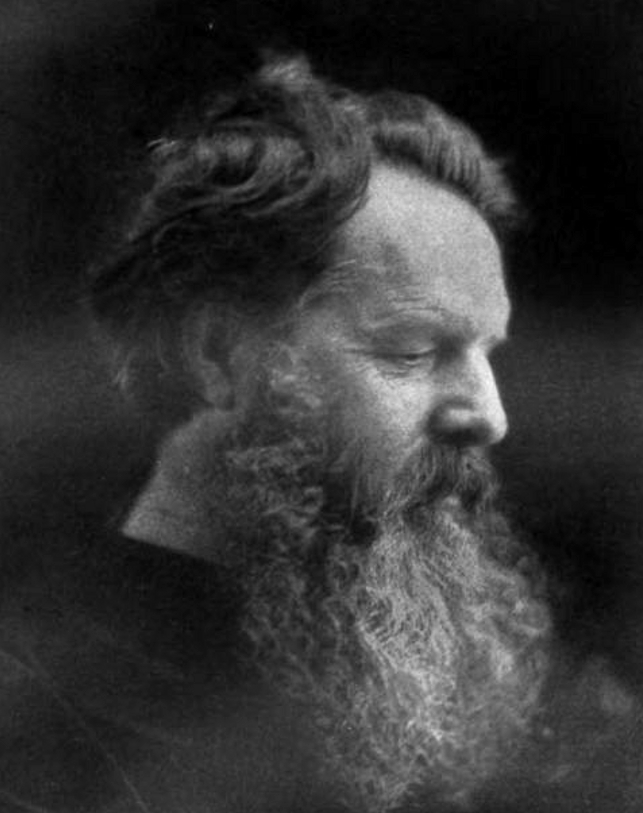
- James Thomas Fields, photographed by Julia Margaret Cameron, circa 1869
- Born: December 31, 1817; Portsmouth, New Hampshire, U.S.
- Died: April 24, 1881 (aged 63); Boston, Massachusetts, U.S.
- Occupations: Editor; Publisher; Poet

James Thomas Fields (December 31, 1817 – April 24, 1881) was an American publisher, editor, and poet. His business, Ticknor and Fields, was a notable publishing house in 19th century Boston.

== Biography ==
=== Early life and family ===
He was born in Portsmouth, New Hampshire on December 31, 1817 and named James Field; the family later added the "s". His father was a sea captain and died before Fields was three. He and his brother were raised by their mother and her siblings, their aunt Mary and uncle George. At the age of 14, Fields took a job at the Old Corner Bookstore in Boston as an apprentice to publishers Carter and Hendee. His first published poetry was included in the Portsmouth Journal in 1837 but he drew more attention when, on September 13, 1838, he delivered his "Anniversary Poem" to the Boston Mercantile Library Association.

=== Publishing career ===
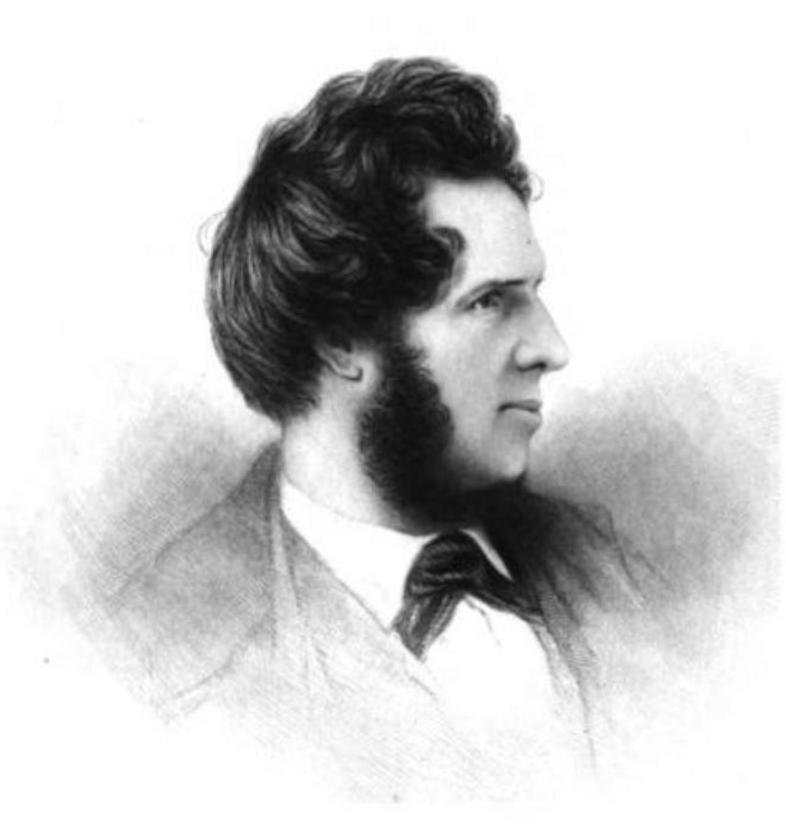
Fields, circa 1855

In 1839, he joined William Ticknor and became junior partner in the publishing and bookselling firm known after 1845 as Ticknor and Fields. Ticknor oversaw the business side of the firm while Fields was its literary expert. He became known for being likable, for his skill at finding creative talent, and for his ability to promote authors and win their loyalty. With this company, Fields became the publisher of leading contemporary American writers, with whom he was on terms of close personal friendship. He was also the American publisher of some of the best-known British writers of his time, some of whom he also knew intimately. The company paid royalties to these British authors, including Charles Dickens and William Makepeace Thackeray, at a time when other American publishers pirated the works of those authors. The first collected edition of Thomas de Quincey's works (20 vols., 1850–1855) was published by his firm. Ticknor and Fields built their company to have a substantial influence in the literary scene which writer and editor Nathaniel Parker Willis acknowledged in a letter to Fields: "Your press is the announcing-room of the country's Court of Poetry."

Sometime in 1844, Fields was engaged to Mary Willard, a local woman six years younger than him. Before they could be married, she died of tuberculosis on April 17, 1845. He maintained a close friendship with her family and, on March 13, 1850, married her 18-year-old sister Eliza Willard at Boston's Federal Street Church. Also sick with tuberculosis, she died on July 13, 1851. Grief-stricken, he left the United States for a time and traveled to Europe.

In 1854, Fields married Annie Adams, who was an author herself. Mrs. Fields was instrumental in helping Mr. Fields establish literary salons at their home at 37 Charles Street in Boston, where they entertained many well-known writers. One such writer was Nathaniel Hawthorne. After Hawthorne's death in 1864, Fields served as a pallbearer for his funeral alongside Amos Bronson Alcott, Ralph Waldo Emerson, Oliver Wendell Holmes Sr., Henry Wadsworth Longfellow, and Edwin Percy Whipple. In 1867, he performed the same role after the death of Nathaniel Parker Willis, along with Holmes, Longfellow, James Russell Lowell, and Samuel Gridley Howe.

Ticknor and Fields purchased The Atlantic Monthly for $10,000 and, about two years later in May 1861, Fields took over the editorship from Lowell. At a New Year's Eve party in 1865, he met William Dean Howells and 10 days later offered him a position as assistant editor of the Atlantic. Howells accepted but was somewhat dismayed by Fields's close supervision.

Ticknor died in 1864, leaving Fields the senior partner for the firm. Fields was less concerned with the retail store owned by the company and wanted to focus on publishing. On November 12, 1864, he sold the Old Corner Bookstore and moved Ticknor and Fields to 124 Tremont Street.

In 1868 the business became Fields, Osgood, and Company, recognizing James R. Osgood. On New Year's Day, 1871, Fields announced his retirement at a small gathering of friends.

=== Later life and death ===
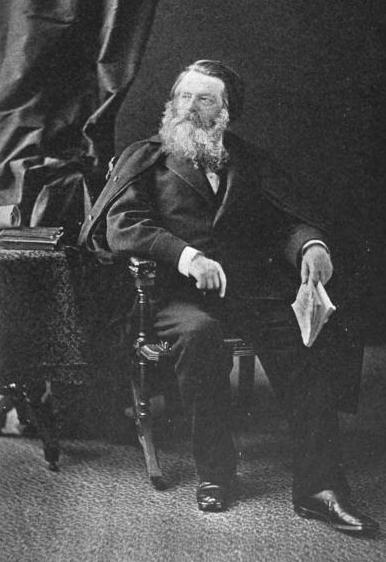
Fields retired from his publishing company in 1871 to focus on lecturing and writing.

No longer involved with editorial duties, he then devoted himself to lecturing and writing. He also edited, with Edwin Percy Whipple, A Family Library of British Poetry (1878).

Fields became increasingly popular as a lecturer throughout the 1870s. In May 1879, Fields suffered a brain hemorrhage and collapsed before a scheduled lecture at Wellesley College. By autumn he seemed to have recovered. In January 1881, he gave what would be his final public lecture, coincidentally at the Mercantile Library Association, the organization which hosted his first public reading. Fields died in Boston on April 24, 1881. He is buried at Mount Auburn Cemetery in Cambridge, Massachusetts.

His wife, Annie Fields, was devastated and demanded friends not mention him and she gradually cut herself off from others. Her friend, writer Celia Thaxter told her, "don't shut yourself away... or you will die a thousand deaths of silence." Shortly after, she began a friendship with Sarah Orne Jewett, and the two became companions for the rest of their lives.

== Writing ==
In addition to his work as a publisher and editor, Fields was also a writer. His chief works were the collection of sketches and essays entitled Underbrush (1877) and the chapters of reminiscence composing Yesterdays with Authors (1871), in which he recorded his personal friendship with William Wordsworth, William Makepeace Thackeray, Charles Dickens, Nathaniel Hawthorne, and others.

Fields also wrote poetry. A number of his works are collected in his book Ballads and Verses published in 1880. This volume contains the poem "The Ballad of the Tempest", which includes the famous lines:

"We are lost!" the captain shouted
As he staggered down the stairs

== Legacy ==
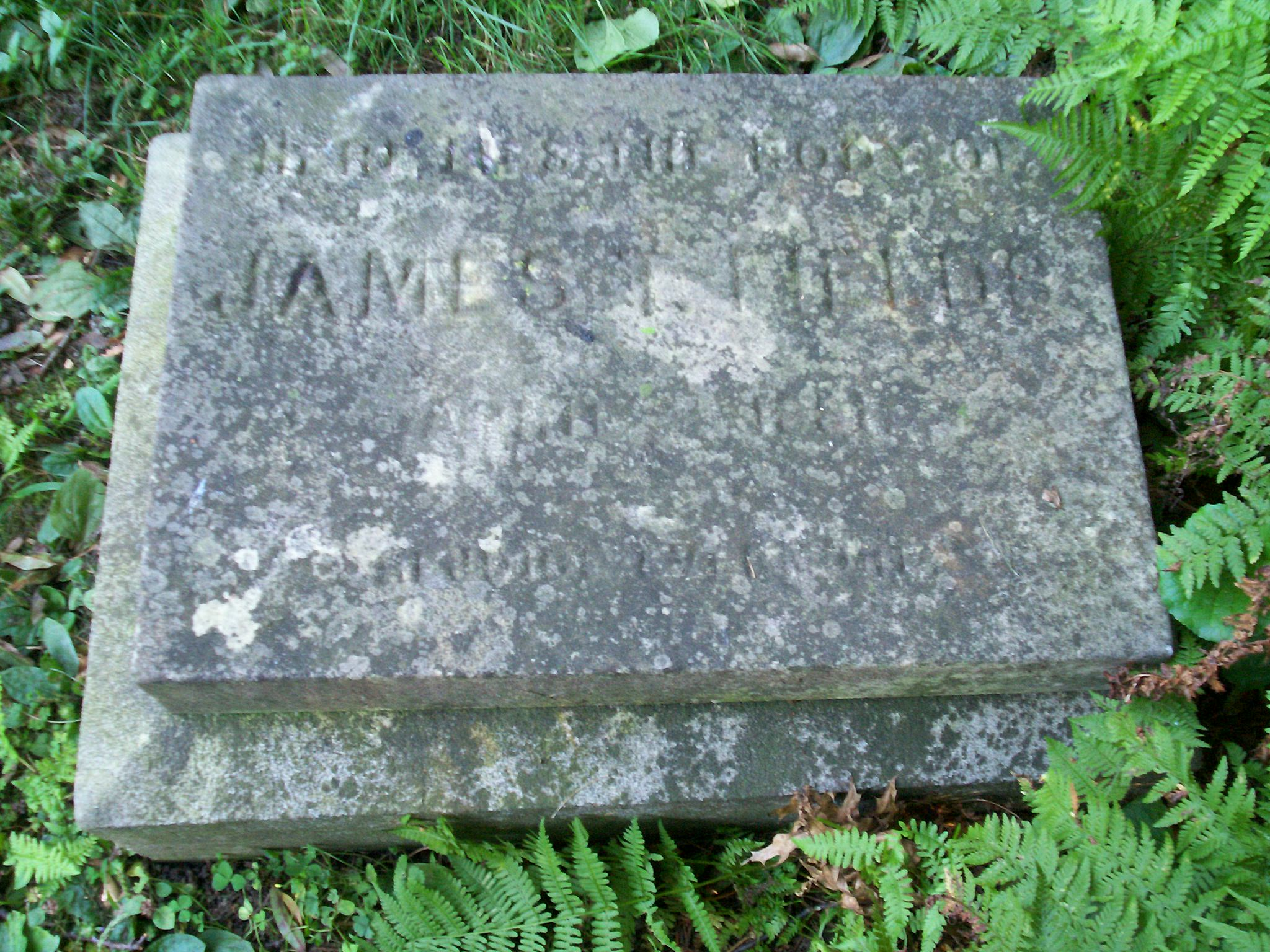
Grave of James T. Fields at Mount Auburn Cemetery

James T. Fields was known in his lifetime as one of the most successful and shrewd book promoters, working at a time when bribery was typical in the publishing culture. Hawthorne said he owed his success as a writer to him: "I care more for your good opinion than for that of a host of critics, and have excellent reason for so doing; inasmuch as my literary success, whatever it has been or may be, is the result of my connection with you".

Fields was particularly successful as a publisher because of his ability to build close relationships with writers. As author Rebecca Harding Davis said, he was "the shrewdest of publishers and kindest of men. He was the wire that conducted the lightning so that it never struck amiss." He also knew the tastes of the reading public. Fields was reputedly able to ascertain what book a visitor to the Old Corner Bookstore would purchase within 10 minutes of arrival.

After Fields's death, his widow Annie Adams Fields wrote the biography Memoir of James T. Fields, by his Wife (Boston, 1881) and Authors and Friends (Boston, 1896), which also reflects on his life. His friend Henry Wadsworth Longfellow wrote a poem called "Auf Wiedersehen" dedicated to him. Fields, along with Longfellow, is featured in the first and third of Matthew Pearl's novels, The Dante Club (2003) and The Last Dickens (2009). Fields is also mentioned in the 1994 film version of Little Women and in Dan Simmons' Drood (novel) (2009).
