= The Award (novel) =

2025 novel by Matthew Pearl

- 1st edition cover
- Author: Matthew Pearl
- Publisher: HarperCollins
- Publication date: December 2, 2025
- ISBN: 978-0-063-44527-7

The Award is a 2025 novel by Matthew Pearl. It received positive reception from critics upon release.

== Synopsis ==
David Trent, a writer living in Cambridge, Massachusetts, forms a relationship with a famous author, Silas Hale after winning a major literary award.

== Development history ==
=== Publication history ===
The Award was published by HarperCollins on December 2, 2025.

== Reception ==
Shelf Awareness published a starred review that noted the novel was different from Pearl's previous works, which were mostly historical fiction, and complimented his prose. The Pittsburgh Post-Gazette described the novel as providing a lens into the "pugilistic literary scene," while The Boston Globe called the main character an "antihero" and compared the novel to works by Edgar Allan Poe. Booklist was also positive, praising Pearl's worldbuilding and describing the characters as maintaining a "chilling relatability." Kirkus Reviews complimented the novel's plot and pacing but criticized the lack of context given to the main character's book, while Publishers Weekly praised the depth given to Trent and Hale's characters but described the plot as "far from believable."
