= Old stone face =

"Old Stone Face" is a nickname for:

- Buster Keaton (1895–1966), American actor, vaudevillian, comedian, filmmaker, stunt performer and writer, also known as the "Great Stone Face"
- Ed Sullivan (1901–1974), American television host and writer
- John Lowe (born 1945), English retired darts player
- Andrei Gromyko (1909–1989), Soviet communist politician

== See also ==
- Judge Dredd, futuristic policeman from the 2000 AD comic, called "Old Stony Face"
- Stoneface (disambiguation)
- Old Man of the Mountain
