= The Lifted Veil (novella) =

1859 horror novella by George Eliot

- Author: George Eliot
- Language: English
- Genre: Horror fiction
- Publisher: Blackwood's Magazine
- Publication date: July 1859
- Publication place: United Kingdom
- Media type: Print (hardback & paperback)

The Lifted Veil is a novella by George Eliot, first published anonymously in Blackwood's Magazine in 1859. It was republished in 1879. Quite unlike the realistic fiction for which Eliot is best known, The Lifted Veil explores themes of extrasensory perception, possible life after death, and the power of fate. The story is a significant part of the Victorian tradition of horror fiction, which includes such other examples as Robert Louis Stevenson's Strange Case of Dr. Jekyll and Mr. Hyde (1886), and Bram Stoker's Dracula (1897).

== Plot summary ==
The unreliable narrator, Latimer, believes that he is cursed with an otherworldly ability to see into the future and the thoughts of other people. His unwanted "gift" seems to stem from a severe childhood illness he suffered while attending school in Geneva. Latimer is convinced of the existence of this power, and his two initial predictions do come true in the way in which he has envisioned them: a peculiar "patch of rainbow light on the pavement" and a few words of dialogue appear to him exactly as expected. Latimer is revolted by much of what he discerns about others' motivations.

Latimer becomes fascinated with Bertha, his brother's cold and coquettish fiancée, because her mind and motives remain atypically closed to him. After his brother's death, Latimer marries Bertha, but the marriage disintegrates as he recognizes Bertha's manipulative and untrustworthy nature. Latimer's friend, scientist Charles Meunier, performs a blood transfusion from himself to Bertha's recently deceased maid. For a few moments the maid comes back to life and accuses Bertha of a plot to poison Latimer. Bertha flees and Latimer soon dies as he had himself foretold at the start of the narrative.

== Criticism and reception ==
Blackwood's hesitated to publish The Lifted Veil due to its uncomfortable and sometimes horrifying scenes — notably the blood transfusion at the end of the story. Blackwood liked the story but knew it might not be successful in his magazine, while his brother thought it was disturbed and urged him not to publish it.

== Literary significance ==
This tale departs from Eliot's usual technique. Latimer's first-person narrative works with causality and chronology, with the narrative ending where it begins.

It is Eliot's only venture into what would later be called science fiction. The story was influenced by the fields of physiology, phrenology, and mesmerism, as well as scientists such as William Gregory, who studied animal magnetism, and Charles-Édouard Brown-Séquard, who performed transfusion experiments. Some academics believe the focus on clairvoyance was reflective of George Eliot's anxiety that her pseudonym had been or would be found out.

== Adaptations in other media ==
In 1948 the story was adapted for an episode of the syndicated radio program The Weird Circle. A two-part radio adaptation by Jonathan Holloway with Toby Stephens as Latimer was broadcast on BBC Radio 4 in 1997 and again on BBC Radio 4 Extra in 2025.

In 2002 the story was adapted for the stage for solo actor by Tim Heath. The adaptation was commissioned by Joseph Millson and was performed by him between 2002 and 2006.
