= The Poe Shadow =

2006 novel by Matthew Pearl

- First edition
- Author: Matthew Pearl
- Language: English
- Genre: Mystery novel
- Publisher: Random House
- Publication date: 2006
- Publication place: United States
- Media type: Hardcover (first edition)
- Pages: 384 pp (first edition hardcover)
- ISBN: 1-4000-6103-2
- OCLC: 62331113
- Dewey Decimal: 813/.6 22
- LC Class: PS3616.E25 P64 2006
- Preceded by: The Dante Club
- Followed by: The Last Dickens

The Poe Shadow is a novel by Matthew Pearl, first published by Random House in 2006. It tells the story of one young lawyer's quest to solve the mystery of Edgar Allan Poe's death in 1849. It is a work of historical and literary fiction, where some previously unpublished details about the last days of Poe are conveyed through the thoughts and the actions of the main character, along with the generally shared ideas on Poe's death as of the publication date.

== Plot summary ==
Baltimore lawyer Quentin Hobson Clark witnesses the somber, simple funeral of Edgar Allan Poe on October 8, 1849. He had previously corresponded with Poe about providing legal support for a new publication, The Stylus. Clark feels obliged to look into the mysterious circumstances surrounding Poe's death, despite protests from his fiancée Hattie Blum and his friend Peter Stuart.

Clark's journey takes him to Paris to seek out the real-life inspiration for Poe's character C. Auguste Dupin, a man of intellect who could help unravel the mystery. After eliminating several possibilities, he meets Baron C.A. Dupin, a famous lawyer, and a detective with a similar name, Auguste Duponte. After a confrontation with the Baron Dupin and his female aide, Bonjour, Clark realizes that the Baron is not the character described in Poe's stories. He determines that Auguste Duponte, with his approach to problem-solving through ratiocination, was the real inspiration for the character.

Clark and Duponte return to Baltimore to investigate Poe's final days, only to find that the Baron and Bonjour are already doing the same. Both parties interview the funeral attendants and witnesses, and try to obtain Poe's final letter, discovered by funeral attendant Henry Reynolds.

== See also ==
- Death of Edgar Allan Poe
- Edgar Allan Poe in popular culture, Poe as a character
