= The Dante Club =

Mystery novel by Matthew Pearl

- First edition
- Author: Matthew Pearl
- Language: English
- Genre: Mystery
- Publisher: Random House
- Publication date: 2003
- Publication place: United States
- Media type: Print (hardback & paperback) and eBook
- Pages: 372 pp (first edition hardcover)
- ISBN: 0-375-50529-6
- OCLC: 49260645
- Dewey Decimal: 813/.6 21
- LC Class: PS3616.E25 D36 2003
- Followed by: The Poe Shadow

The Dante Club is a mystery novel by Matthew Pearl and his debut work, set amidst a series of murders in the American Civil War era. It also concerns a club of poets, including such historical figures as Henry Wadsworth Longfellow, Oliver Wendell Holmes Sr., and James Russell Lowell, who are translating Dante Alighieri's Divine Comedy from Italian into English and who notice parallels between the murders and the punishments detailed in Dante's Inferno.

The work reached the top of several best-seller lists, including Borders, Washington Post, and Boston Globe, and also appeared on the New York Times Best Seller List.

The plot is largely fictional, although the main characters are real, including many of their biographical details. Supporting and background characters are mostly fictional, as are those directly involved with the murders.

== Plot ==
The Dante Club begins with the murder of fictional Massachusetts Chief Justice Artemus Healey, who had avoided taking a position to stop or support the escaped slaves of the South. Found by his chambermaid near a white flag atop a short wooden staff, Healey had been hit in the head and then left in his garden to be eaten alive by strategically placed maggots and stung by hornets. Then Reverend Talbot, who was paid by the Harvard Corporation to write against Dante, was found dead in an underground cemetery, buried up to his waist upside down, his feet burnt and buried over money that he had accepted as a bribe.

Members of the Dante Club, a group of poets translating the Divine Comedy from Italian into English, notice the parallels between the murders and the punishments detailed in Dante's Inferno. The club, including Henry Wadsworth Longfellow, Oliver Wendell Holmes Sr., and James Russell Lowell, sets out to solve the murders, fearing that the truth will ruin Dante's burgeoning reputation in America, thus making their translation a failure, as well as the obvious problem that they would be virtually the only suspects if they reported this information to the police. Then, Phineas Jennison, both a wealthy contributor to the Harvard Corporation and friend to the translators (a "schismatic"), is sliced open exactly down the middle—all killed in extreme fashion and undeniable resemblance to the punishments of people in Dante's Inferno.

Eventually, the murderer is discovered to be a former Civil War Soldier Dan Teal, a man who worked at Ticknor and Fields and at the Harvard Corporation. Driven partly mad by the trauma of his war experiences, Teal hears Dante Club member George Washington Greene giving sermons on Dante to other soldiers, and becomes convinced that Dante alone understood the need for perfect justice in the world. Adopting a new name and identity (intending to become one with the poet, but being unable to spell "Alighieri"), he takes it upon himself to protect Dante and release Hell's punishments as indicated in the Inferno, in order to purify the city. Teal finds each of his victims when learning of their involvement in the stopping of the translations, which become their respective sins. The club eventually tries to capture him, with the aid of Boston's first African-American policeman Nicholas Rey, the only other person who saw the connection, while he is attempting to punish Harvard Treasurer Dr. Manning and Pliny Mead ("the traitors"). Mead was a student of the Dante course who helped betray his teacher by cooperating with Manning. Teal flees, then tries to round up the translators, to punish them for not embracing his "work." Dr. Manning—saved by Longfellow, Holmes, Rey, Lowell, and Fields—realizes the situation as he recovered from his attempted punishment of being buried naked in ice. He sees Teal with a gun to Longfellow, and Manning ends the murderer's life, thus returning the city to normal.

== Characters ==
1. Henry Wadsworth Longfellow – poet and main translator of the club
2. Oliver Wendell Holmes Sr. – doctor and poet
3. James Russell Lowell – first poet of the club
4. George Washington Greene – pastor and oldest member
5. James T. Fields – publisher and member
6. Nicholas Rey – 1st African American policeman, the idea of racism is addressed in the novel through Nicholas Rey
7. Chief Kurtz – head of police
8. Judge Healey – first killed, Reason for punishment- neutral
9. Reverend Talbot – second killed, Reason for punishment- simoniac
10. Phineas Jennison – third killed, Reason for punishment- schismatic
11. Dr. Manning – treasurer of Harvard Craper, traitor
12. Pliny Mead – fourth killed, student of Lowell's, also considered traitor
13. Pietro Bachi – former teacher of Italian at Harvard, and original suspect in murder
14. Dan Teal – murderer, soldier from the civil war, real name Benjamin Galvin. His fake name Dan Teal was accidentally created when he attempted to write Dante Alighieri on a piece of paper. Eventually, shot twice by Manning
15. Langdon Peasly – Boston's greatest safecracker, accused Willard Burndy of the murder
16. Willard Burndy- A safecracker accused of murder
17. Edward Burnett – Harvard student later James Russell Lowell's son in law
