= Matthew Pearl =

American novelist and educator (born 1975)

- Born: October 2, 1975 (age 50); New York City, U.S.
- Education: NSU University School; Harvard College; Yale Law School
- Occupations: Novelist; educator
- Writing career
- Notable works: The Dante Club (2003); The Poe Shadow (2006); The Last Dickens (2009)
- Website: www.matthewpearl.com

Matthew Pearl (born October 2, 1975) is an American novelist and educator. His novels include The Dante Club, The Poe Shadow, The Last Dickens, The Technologists, and The Last Bookaneer./

== Biography ==
Pearl was born in New York City and grew up in Fort Lauderdale, Florida, where he graduated from the University School of Nova Southeastern University (NSU), a K-12 school. He earned degrees from Harvard College and Yale Law School. He currently resides in Cambridge, Massachusetts. In 1998, Pearl won the Dante Award from the Dante Society of America for his undergraduate essay, Dante in Transit: Emerson’s Lost Role as Dantean.

== Bibliography ==
The Dante Club was published in 2003. His second novel, a historical thriller about the death of Edgar Allan Poe called The Poe Shadow, was published by Random House in the United States in 2007. His third novel, The Last Dickens, was published in the United States in 2009.

The Technologists, a mystery alternative-history thriller set in the early years of the Massachusetts Institute of Technology, was published in the United States in 2012.

Other works include The Professor's Assassin (2011), The Last Bookaneer (2015), Ginnifer (short story) (2016), and The Dante Chamber (2018)

In 2021, Pearl published his first nonfiction book The Taking of Jemima Boone: Colonial Settlers, Tribal Nations, and the Kidnap That Shaped America, published by HarperCollins.

In 2025, Pearl published The Award through HarperCollins.
