= Ticknor and Fields =

American publishing company (1832–1878)

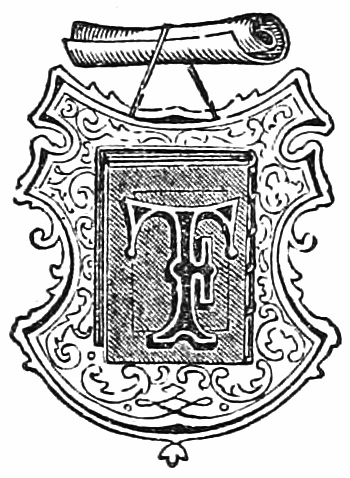
- Ticknor and Fields colophon, c. 1867
- Status: Defunct
- Founded: 1832
- Founder: William Davis Ticknor and John Allen
- Successor: Houghton Mifflin
- Country of origin: United States
- Headquarters location: Boston
- Key people: James T. Fields, James R. Osgood
- Publication types: Books, Magazines

Ticknor and Fields was an American publishing company based in Boston, Massachusetts. Founded as a bookstore in 1832, the business published many 19th-century American authors, including Ralph Waldo Emerson, Nathaniel Hawthorne, Henry James, Henry Wadsworth Longfellow, Harriet Beecher Stowe, Henry David Thoreau, and Mark Twain. It also became an early publisher of The Atlantic Monthly and North American Review.

The firm was named after founder William Davis Ticknor and apprentice James T. Fields, although the names of additional business partners would come and go, notably that of James R. Osgood in the firm's later years. Financial problems led Osgood to merge the company with the publishing firm of Henry Oscar Houghton in 1878, forming a precursor to the modern publisher Houghton Mifflin Harcourt.

Houghton Mifflin revived the Ticknor and Fields name as an imprint from 1979 to 1989.

== Company history ==
=== Early years ===
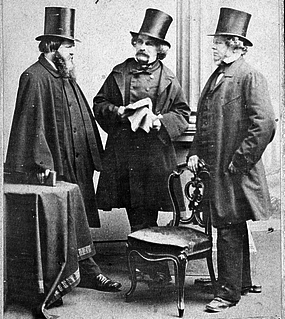
James Fields, Nathaniel Hawthorne, William Ticknor; photo by J.W. Black, ca.1863

In 1832 William Davis Ticknor and John Allen began a small bookselling business called Ticknor and Allen which operated out of the Old Corner Bookstore located on Washington and School streets in Boston, Massachusetts. The space had previously been used by publishers Carter & Hendee, who hired a teenaged James T. Fields as an apprentice. When Ticknor and Allen began their business, Fields joined them. A year later, Allen withdrew from the firm, and Ticknor continued business under William D. Ticknor and Company. When John Reed and Fields became partners in 1845, the imprint was changed to Ticknor, Reed, and Fields. Reed retired in 1854 and the imprint was renamed as Ticknor and Fields, which became well known.

During these years the firm purchased and printed the Atlantic Monthly and the North American Review. Also in 1842 Ticknor became the first American publisher to pay foreign writers for their works, beginning with a check to Alfred Tennyson. These were prosperous years for the firm, and they compiled an impressive list of authors, Horatio Alger, Lydia Maria Child, Charles Dickens, Ralph Waldo Emerson, Nathaniel Hawthorne, Oliver Wendell Holmes, Henry Wadsworth Longfellow, James Russell Lowell, Harriet Beecher Stowe, Alfred Tennyson, Henry David Thoreau, Mark Twain, and John Greenleaf Whittier. The Old Corner Bookstore had become the publishing house and meeting place for these authors. Many writers visited many times a week; George William Curtis referred to it as "the hub of the Hub", referring to Boston's nickname, and said that it "compelled the world to acknowledge that there was an American literature".

The success of the firm was largely in part to the perfectly matched but widely varied talents of Ticknor and Fields. Ticknor gave his attention to the financial and manufacturing departments while Fields focused on literary relations and social aspects of the business. It was also during these years that Ticknor and Fields developed a close relationship with the Riverside Press, founded by Henry Oscar Houghton in 1852.

=== After Ticknor ===
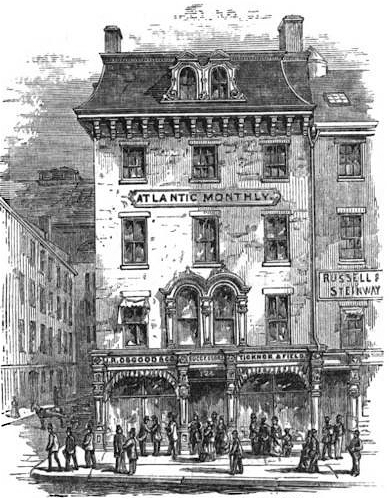
Ticknor & Fields office, 124 Tremont Street, Boston, ca.1868; located across from the Park Street Church

In the spring of 1864, Ticknor accompanied Nathaniel Hawthorne on a trip to restore the author's health, at the urging of his wife Sophia Hawthorne. During the trip, Ticknor became ill with pneumonia. Hawthorne wrote to Fields that "our friend Ticknor is suffering under a billious attack... He had previously seemed uncomfortable, but not to an alarming degree." Ticknor died on the morning of April 10, 1864.

Upon Ticknor's sudden and unexpected death, interests in the firm were carried on by his son Howard M. Ticknor. During these years the business had outgrown the Old Corner Bookstore and Fields, now in charge of the company, was no longer interested in the retail store. He sold the Old Corner Bookstore on November 12, 1864, and moved the publishing house to 124 Tremont Street. The firm also began to publish Our Young Folks edited by Howard M. Ticknor. The younger Ticknor soon retired and, in 1868, the firm was reorganized as Fields, Osgood, & Co. Benjamin Holt Ticknor, son of William Davis Ticknor, was admitted at a partner in 1870. On New Year's Day, 1871, Fields announced his retirement from the business at a small gathering of friends, intending to focus on his own writing. On January 2, 1871, the remaining partners bought out Fields's share of the company for $120,000 and it was renamed James R. Osgood & Co.

Osgood, who considered Fields a mentor, attracted substantial new talent and published new works by Thomas Bailey Aldrich, Bret Harte, William Dean Howells, Henry James, Sarah Orne Jewett, Lucy Larcom, Elizabeth Stuart Phelps Ward, Celia Thaxter, and Charles Dudley Warner.

=== Final years ===
The firm invested in heliotype printing technology, various periodicals, and established a New York office. Within a few years, the company was in financial difficulty and Osgood and B. H. Ticknor were forced to sell off various assets, including many stereotype plates. By December 1878, they were forced to merge with Hurd & Houghton and became Houghton, Osgood, and Co. Henry Oscar Houghton became a partner in the deal. The partnership lasted until 1880, when Osgood left to form a second J. R. Osgood and Company. Houghton's company, now Houghton, Mifflin, and Co, retained the rights to the Ticknor and Fields backlist. The second J. R. Osgood and Co. was taken over by Benjamin Holt Ticknor in 1885 under the name Ticknor and Company, based (by the first quarter of 1890) at 211 Tremont Street. Ticknor and Company operated until 1889 when it became part of Houghton, Mifflin, and Co. In 1908 the name was changed to Houghton Mifflin Company.

=== Twentieth-century revival ===
In 1979, Houghton Mifflin revived the Ticknor and Fields name as an imprint. Chester Kerr was the editor from its reestablishment to 1984; Corlies Smith followed him from 1984 to 1989.

== Image gallery ==
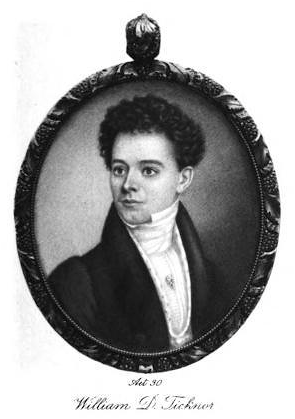
William D. Ticknor

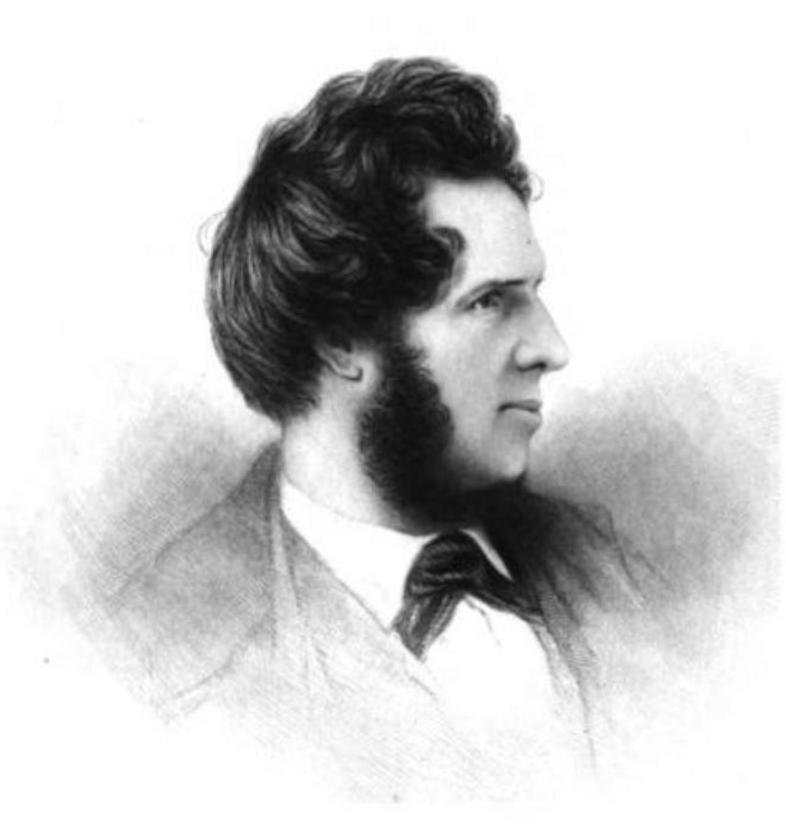
James T. Fields

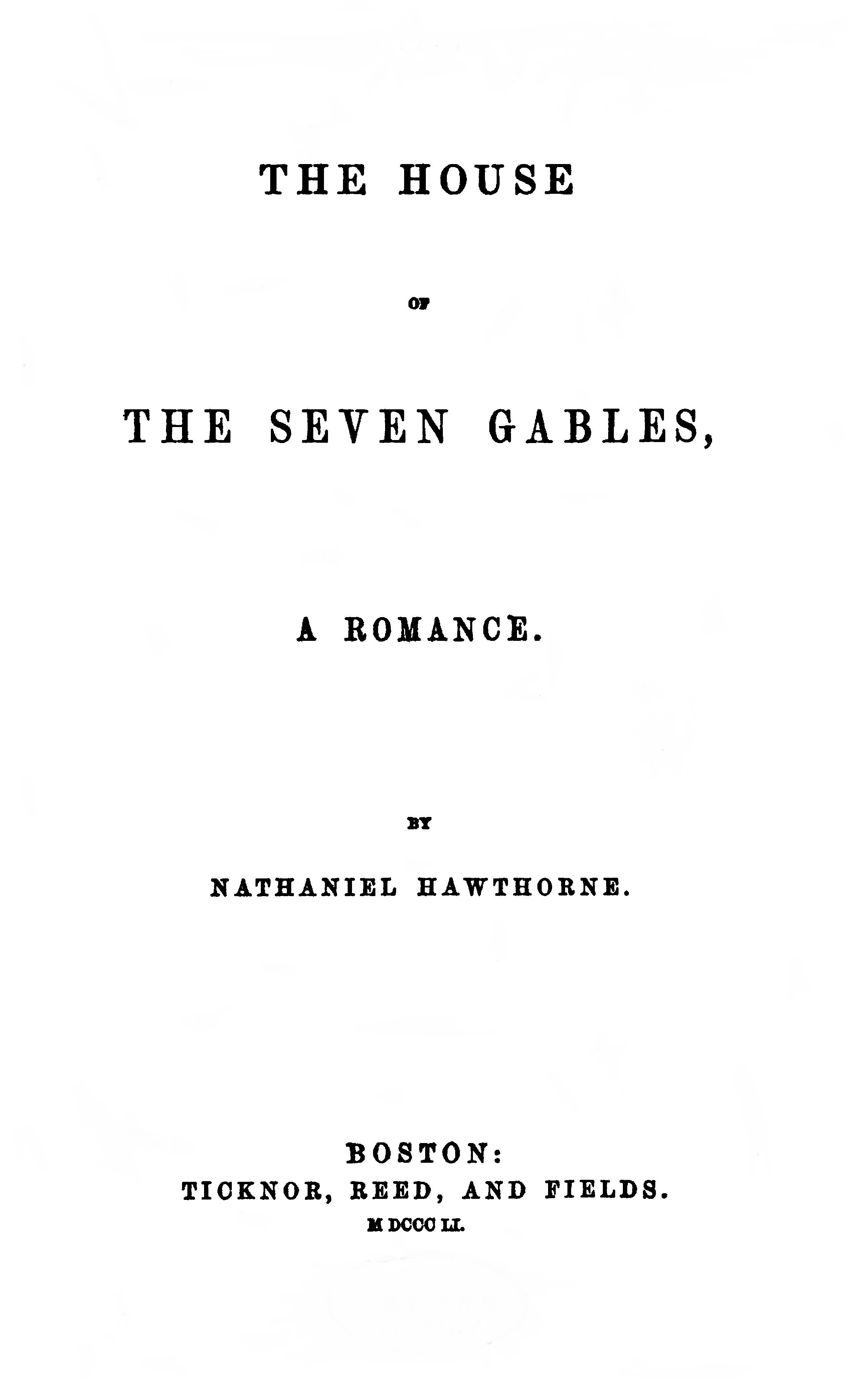
The House of the Seven Gables by Nathaniel Hawthorne, 1851

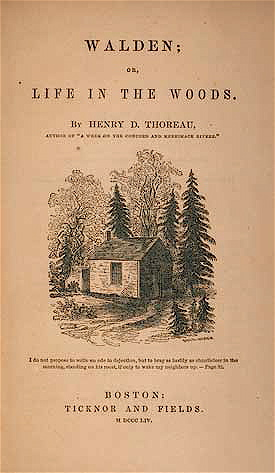
Walden by Henry David Thoreau, 1854

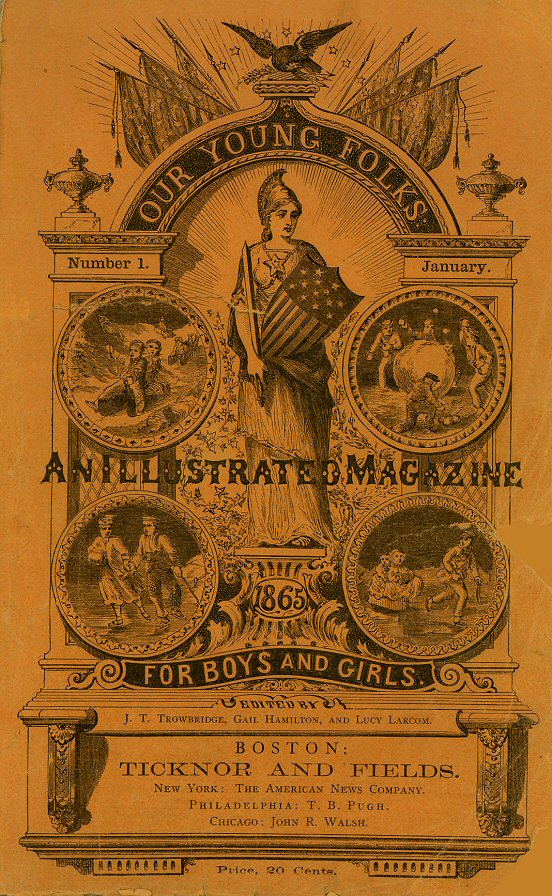
Our Young Folks, 1865

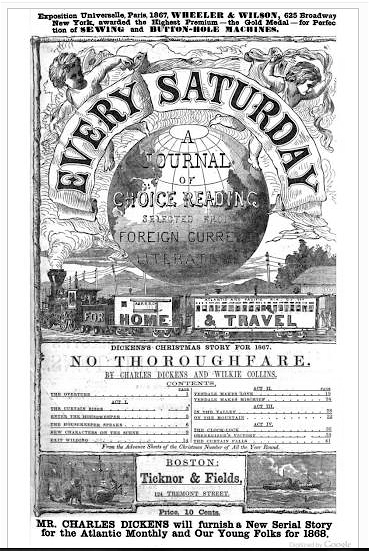
Every Saturday, 1867 Christmas issue, featuring story by Dickens and Wilkie Collins

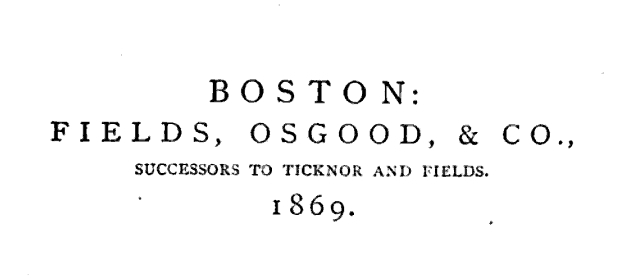
Title page showing transition from name "Ticknor and Fields" to "Fields, Osgood, & Co."

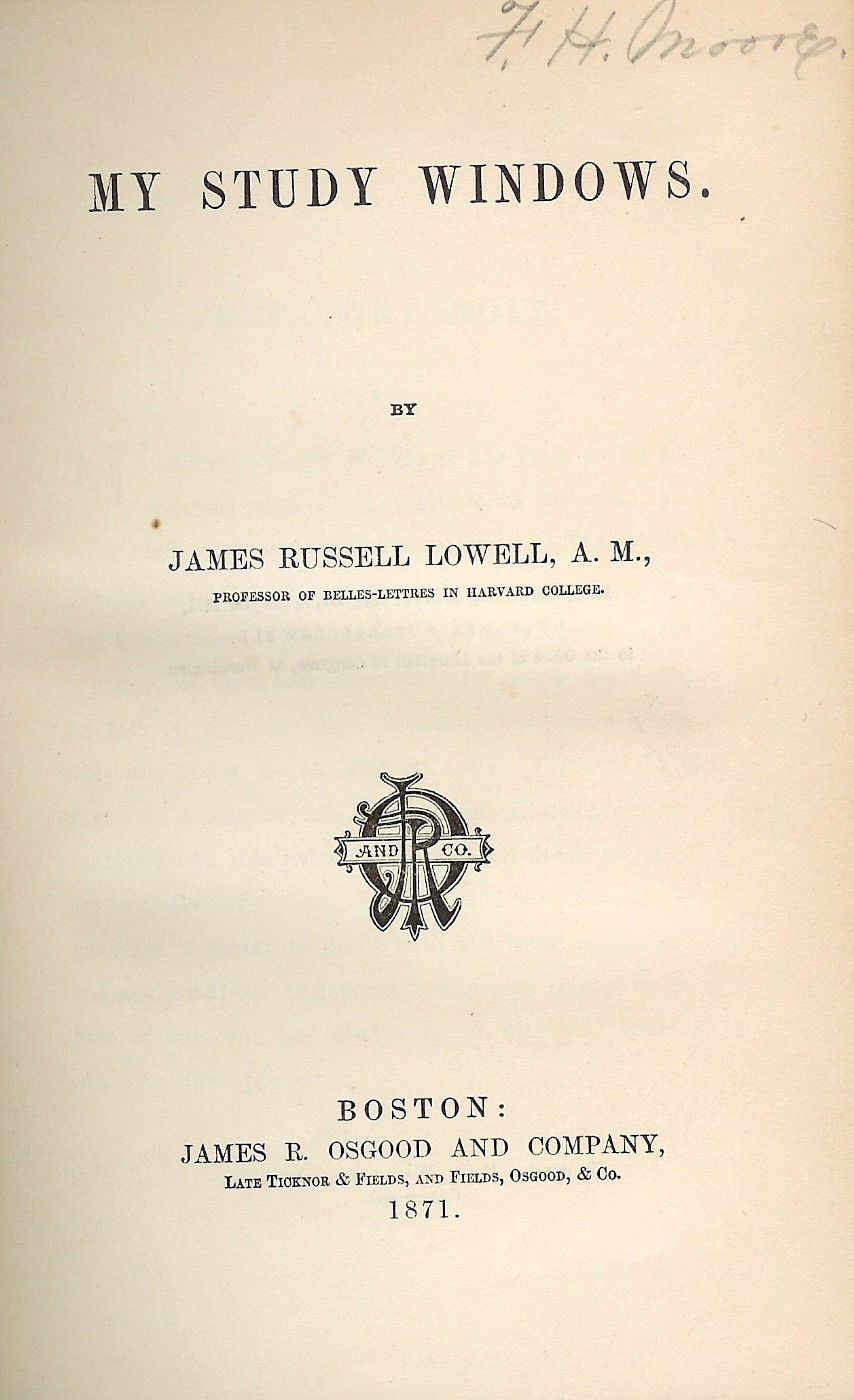
Title page during transition to the name James R. Osgood & Company, "late Ticknor & Fields, and Fields, Osgood, & Co."
