= Spey =

Spey may refer to:

- Spey River (disambiguation)
- Spey casting, a fly fishing technique developed on the River Spey
- Rolls-Royce Spey, an early turbofan engine
- HMS Spey, the name of seven ships of the Royal Navy
- Spey-wife, a Scots language term for a fortune-telling woman

== See also ==
- Spay (disambiguation)
