= Teuchter =

Pejorative term for anybody outside Glasgow and surrounding areas

Teuchter (English: /ˈtjuːxtər/ TEWKH-tər, Scots: [ˈtjuxtər, ˈtʃuxtər]) is a Lowland Scots word sometimes used to offensively describe a Scottish Highlander, in particular a Gaelic-speaking Teuchter. The term is also in use with more broad meanings attached, commonly applied to any Scot perceived to be from a rural area. It is offensive, equivalent to other cultural epithets used by more powerful groups to describe people they have oppressed, but is often seen as amusing by the speaker. The term is contemptuous, essentially describing someone seen to be uncouth and rural.

== Derivation ==
The word also shows up as cheuchter, chuchter but has no universally accepted orthography. From relative obscurity, it gained currency around 1910.

There are three main theories on the etymology of the word:

- a purely Gaelic derivation from tuath [t̪ʰuə] "peasantry, tenantry" or deoch [tʲɔx] "drink" (borrowed into Scots as teuch) plus an agent-forming suffix -air or -adair
- a derivation from the Scots adjective teuch "physically or mentally strong, tough" plus a suffix
- a derivation from the Scots noun teuchit/teuchat "lapwing"

One folk etymology/urban myth is that during the First World War, many members of the Highland regiments were pipers. A book of sheet music for the pipes is called a "tutor", and when pronounced with the pre-aspiration of Gaelic accents when speaking English, this sounds like "teuchter".

== Humour ==
Like other rural stereotypes, teuchters commonly feature in jokes (Billy Connolly has performed and recorded a sketch where a teuchter visiting the city marvels at a bus as "a hoose wi wheels") though such stories often end with the apparently naive teuchter triumphing through hidden wiliness.

The archetypal cartoon teuchter is the cartoon character Angus Og, created by Ewen Bain.

A teuchter is the hero of Scottish musician Bill Hill's "The Portree Kid", which parodies the song "Ghost Riders in the Sky" as "The teuchter that cam frae Skye".

== See also ==
- Culchie
- Gaels
- Russian stereotyping of rural people via Chukchi jokes
- Taig
- Yokel
