= Yokel =

Stock character; unsophisticated country person

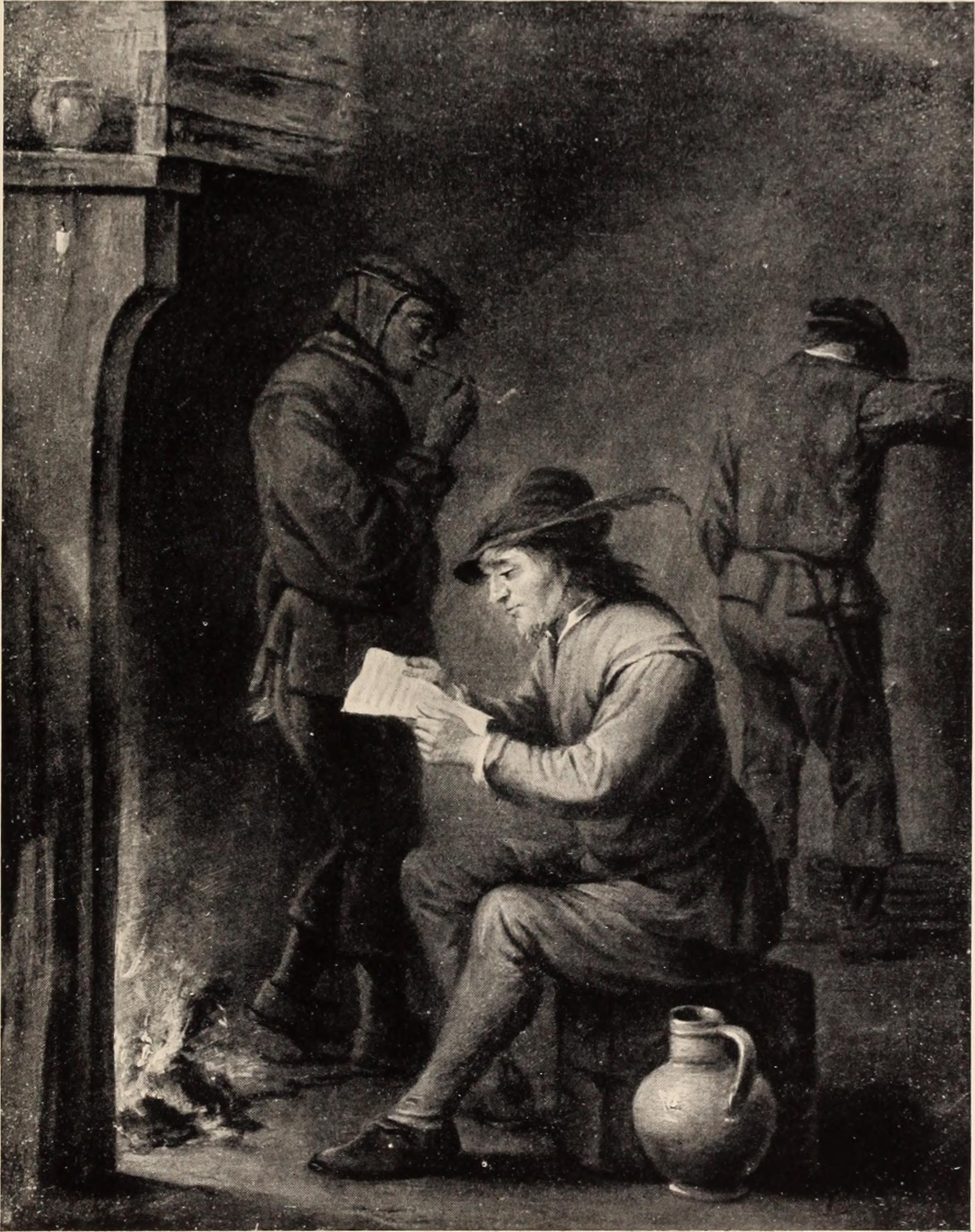
A painting of three peasants by David Teniers the Younger

Yokel is one of several derogatory terms referring to the stereotype of unsophisticated country people. The term is of uncertain etymology and is only attested from the early 19th century on. It is considered a type of discrimination against people from rural environments.

Yokels are depicted as straightforward, simple, naïve, and easily deceived, failing to see through false pretenses. They are also depicted as talking about bucolic topics such as cows, sheep, goats, wheat, fields, crops, and tractors to the exclusion of all else. Broadly, they are portrayed as unaware of or uninterested in the rest of the modern world as it remains outside their own surroundings.

In the UK, yokels are traditionally depicted as wearing the old West Country/farmhand's dress of straw hat and white smock, chewing or sucking a piece of straw and carrying a pitchfork or rake, listening to "Scrumpy and Western" music. Yokels are portrayed as living in rural areas of Britain such as the West Country, East Anglia and the Yorkshire Dales. They speak with country dialects from various parts of Britain.

In the United States, the term is used to describe someone living in rural areas.

Synonyms for yokel include bubba, country bumpkin, hayseed, chawbacon, rube, redneck, hillbilly and hick.

== Fictional examples ==
- The Clampetts, in The Beverly Hillbillies TV series
- Cousin Eddie Johnson of the National Lampoon's Vacation movies
- The Hazzard County residents, of The Dukes of Hazzard TV series and the related film Moonrunners (1975)
- The hillbilly residents of Dogpatch, in the Li'l Abner comic strip
- Larry, Darryl, and Darryl, owners of the Minuteman Café from Newhart
- The Hooterville residents, in the sister TV series Green Acres and Petticoat Junction
- Rose Nylund, portrayed by Betty White, one of the four lead characters from The Golden Girls TV series, who was from the midwestern town of St. Olaf, Minnesota and often told stories from her time living in St. Olaf
- The Simpsons animated television series character Cletus Spuckler, referred to in a song in one episode as "Cletus, the Slack-Jawed Yokel"
- Ronnie Barker and Ronnie Corbett, who portray yokels in BBC1 sketch show The Two Ronnies
- The nurse Nellie Forbush in musical South Pacific, who describes herself as a "hick" from Little Rock, Arkansas
- Willie Stark in the 1946 novel All the King's Men, who often uses the word hick in his speeches to describe the poor voters and himself, for being fooled by the elite. He calls upon citizens to vote for him, promising he will be the voice of the hicks.
- Niko Bellic, the main character in Grand Theft Auto IV is called a 'yokel' on more than one occasion by one of his employers, Vlad Glebov. This is meant to be a derogatory reference to the fact that Niko is a immigrant from the Balkans.
- Ike and Addley, characters from the 1980 horror film Mother's Day.
- Cass Parker, a main character on the Australian television series Prisoner (Prisoner: Cell Block H).
- In the SpongeBob SquarePants episode, Squirrel Jokes, Sandy Cheeks pretends to be the yokel stereotype SpongeBob's squirrel jokes make her out to be to teach him a lesson.
- Larry the Cable Guy, a character played by comedian Daniel Lawrence Whitney. Larry the Cable Guy is often confused for being Lawrence's real-life persona, though the confusion is enforced by the fact that Lawrence rarely speaks to the public in his real voice, has used the character in various movies, and is usually credited for his roles under this name.
- In Red Dead Redemption 2 the term is used numerous times.
- Ernest P. Worrell was a fictional yokel who originated in commercials and eventually spun off into film and television.
- This Country is a TV mockumentary about two cousins in Gloucestershire, England, who aspire to a glamorous urban lifestyle despite only ever knowing their isolated poor rural village
- Maud Jenkins and her relatives in the poem Mrs. Judge Jenkins by Bret Harte. The poem is a parody of Maud Muller.
- In the manga Vagabond, the main character refers to himself as a "bumpkin"

== Similar terms ==
=== Teuchter ===
In Scotland, those from the Highlands and Islands, Moray, Aberdeenshire, and other rural areas are often referred to by urban or lowland Scots as teuchters.

People from the rural south of Scotland are sometimes known as "Doonhamers" ("Doon hame" meaning "down home").

=== Culchie ===
In Ireland, this term is generally used by urban dwellers as a slur for rural dwellers. In Dublin and Belfast, it's often used for people from outside said cities, even people from other large urban areas. Synonyms for culchie include country bumpkin, bogger, muck-savage and redneck.

=== Hick ===
According to the Oxford English Dictionary the term is a "by-form" of the personal name Richard (like Dick) and Hob (like Bob) for Robert. Although the English word "hick" is of recent vintage, distinctions between urban and rural dwellers are ancient.

According to a popular etymology, hick derives from the nickname "Old Hickory" for Andrew Jackson, one of the first presidents of the United States to come from rural hard-scrabble roots. This nickname suggested that Jackson was tough and enduring like an old hickory tree. Jackson was particularly admired by the residents of remote and mountainous areas of the United States, people who would come to be known as "hicks."

Another explanation of the term hick describes a time when hickory nut flour was used and sold. Tough times, such as the depression, led to the use of hickory nuts as an alternative to traditional grains. People who harvested, processed, or sold hickory products, such as hickory flour, were referred to as "hicks". The term was generalized over time to include people who lived in rural areas and were not considered as sophisticated as their urban counterparts.

Though not a term explicitly denoting lower class, some argue that the term degrades impoverished rural people and that "hicks" continue as one of the few groups that can be ridiculed and stereotyped with impunity. In "The Redneck Manifesto," Jim Goad argues that this stereotype has largely served to blind the general population to the economic exploitation of rural areas, specifically in Appalachia, the South, and parts of the Midwest.

=== Bogan ===
In Australia and New Zealand, the term "bogan" is used to refer to someone who is considered unrefined or unsophisticated.

== See also ==
- Boondocks
- Chukchi jokes
- Hillbilly
- Moonrakers
- Moonshiner
- Mountain man
- NASCAR dad
- Okie
- Redneck
- "Sticks Nix Hick Pix"
- Teuchter
