= Angus Og (comics) =

Scottish comic strip

Angus Og (originally Angus Òg) is a comic strip created by Scottish cartoonist Ewen Bain. It ran from 1960 to December 1989, first in the Glasgow Bulletin and then in the Daily Record and The Sunday Mail.

The strip's setting is the fictional island of Drambeg in the Outer Hebrides. The main character is introduced as a typical 'Highland beatnik', while his girlfriend Mairileen is a homage to the American actress Marilyn Monroe.

== Background ==
Set on the fictional island of Drambeg (dràma beag, a wee dram) in the Utter Hebrides (Outer Hebrides in Scots slang), it featured the eponymous Angus Og, and a whole host of other characters, including:

- Mrs Og, Angus's mother, and facially his virtual twin, distinguishable from Angus only by a headscarf and apron
- Donald, Angus's brother
- Lachie Mor, Angus's best friend
- Mairileen, Angus's erstwhile girlfriend, who is rarely seen without her black beret, and Bain's Hebridean homage to Marilyn Monroe
- Mr MacSonachan, the Minister
- Rosie the Highland Cow
- Granny McBrochan, the local spey-wife
- Constable McPhater

The first story, published in the Bulletin in 1960, introduced Angus Og as a 'Highland beatnik', under the title "A Teenage Tangle of the Isles". "Òg" is Scottish Gaelic for "young", and "Angus" was seen as a stereotypical Highland first name. Angus Og was also the name of a figure in Gaelic mythology, a kind of love god, and a Scottish historical figure, a Lord of the Isles: it is possible that the name was an ironic reference to this.

Bain used eye dialect for the strip to approximate (and knowingly stereotype) a Western Isles accent: hence chentleman (gentleman), Tonald (Donald), effery (every) as well as aspects of Scots, such as bachle (clumsy or useless person), crater (creature) and the near-ubiquitous Ochone! (Oh no!) whenever things went wrong, as they invariably did. Given the largely Lowland readership of the Daily Record, Bain used virtually no Gaelic beyond Angus's name, and the occasional Ciamar a tha thu? (How are you?). Whenever the story featured Glasgow or Glaswegians (Angus's relatives all seemed to come from Glasgow), Bain took a similar approach, resembling the Parliamo Glasgow stereotype popularised by Stanley Baxter.

Angus Og has been described as the "archetypal cartoon teuchter". When he leaves the confines of the islands to go on holiday abroad, he still wears his Wellington boots on the beach.

Bain wrote over 100 stories during the strip's 28-year existence. Most stories ran to around 70 daily instalments, around 2 months each. However several were shorter. The final story, The Devil to Pay, was unfinished at the time of Bain's death.

The original strips are now held at the Skye and Lochalsh Archive Centre at Portree, having been donated by Bain's daughter in 2019. In 2022, plans to digitise and conserve the collection were announced. A touring exhibition in 2024, beginning at the Mitchell Library in Glasgow and subsequently in libraries across western Highland, showcased many of the original strips.

== Plots ==
Originally, Bain introduced an element of fantasy to the stories, with Angus befriended by a 'wee man', a fairy-like spirit who helps him become a pop star chanter player. However, after joining the Daily Record, Bain was persuaded to ground the stories in more real-life situations, often featuring topical issues such as the change from and to British Summer Time (an issue of considerable controversy in the Highlands) and featuring figures such as the Prime Minister of the day. Bain himself was politically a supporter of Scottish independence and many of the strips satirised Westminster politics.

Following publication of The Kelpie between November 1983 and January 1984, a story involving the return of salmon to the upper Clyde, Bain was presented with a certificate from the Clyde River Purification Board in recognition of him raising awareness of the issue of river quality.

Some of the other memorable storylines included Drambeg being towed away to the Caribbean one night, and the islanders experiencing their own version of Whisky Galore.

== Angus Og of Puckermuck Cove ==
A comic strip of the same name also appeared in Canada, as part of the Puckermuck Cove series, but was completely unrelated. The character hosted a website entitled "Every Celtic Thing on the Web" until 2000. It was created by Michael D. McNeill

== Books ==
Four collections have been published, two in Bain's lifetime. Most feature complete stories, and together contain about a dozen complete, with the 21st anniversary collection featuring extracts only. As of 2015 all are out of print.

- Bain, Ewen (1974) Angus Og (Glasgow: Daily Record)
- Bain, Ewen (1981) 21 Years of Angus Og (Glasgow: Daily Record and Sunday Mail)
- Bain, Ewen (1990) The Best of Angus Og (Edinburgh: Mainstream Publishing Company Ltd) ISBN 1-85158-377-7
- Bain, Ewen (1999) Angus Og: from the Og Logs (Glasgow: Zipo Publishing) ISBN 1-901984-04-4

== See also ==
- Aengus: Aengus Óg ("Aengus the Young")
