= SS Whittier Victory =

Victory ship of the United States

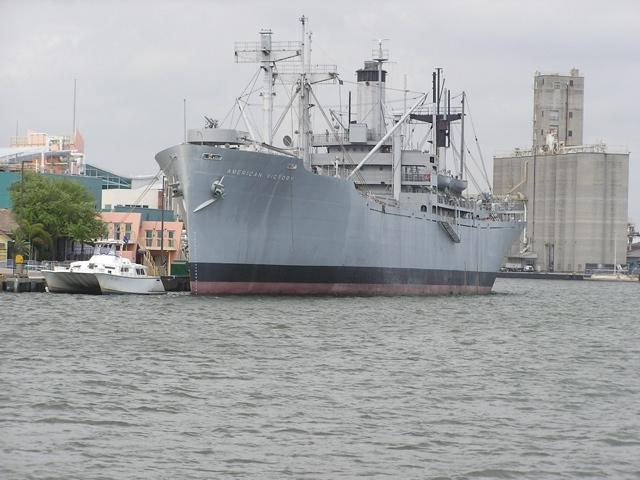
- Typical Victory Ship

History

United States
- Namesake: Whittier College in Whittier, California
- Builder: California Shipbuilding (Calship)
- Yard number: 272
- Laid down: 27 April 1945
- Launched: 20 June 1945
- Acquired: 18 July 1945
- In service: 1945
- Out of service: 1969 (Final)
- Identification: IMO number: 5389061
- Fate: Scrapped 1993

General characteristics
- Class & type: VC2-S-AP2 Victory Ship
- Tonnage: 10,750 long tons deadweight (DWT)
- Length: 455 ft (139 m)
- Beam: 62 ft (19 m)
- Draft: 28 ft 6 in (8.69 m)
- Propulsion: Allis-Chalmers cross-compound steam turbine with double reduction gears; 6,000 hp (4,500 kW) at 103 rpm
- Speed: 17.5 knots (32.4 km/h; 20.1 mph)
- Range: 23,500 mi (20,400 nmi; 37,800 km)
- Capacity: 500,000 cu ft (14,000 m^{3}) (approximate)
- Complement: 62 United States Merchant Marine and United States Navy Armed Guard
- Sensors & processing systems: Modern Surface Search Radar, fitted in 1980's
- Armament: 1 × 5-inch stern gun; 2 × 3-inch bow anti-aircraft gun; 8 × Oerlikon 20 mm cannon
- Aircraft carried: none
- Aviation facilities: none

SS Whittier Victory was a Victory ship which saw brief service in the Pacific Theater of Operations during the waning months of World War II and Vietnam War from 1966–1969. Built in June 1945, she carried ammunition and other cargo from U.S. West Coast ports to Southeast Asia, then ferried cargo, equipment and troops back to the U.S. after the war ended. She survived one hurricane. Whittier Victory spent time between 1946 and 1966 chartered to commercial carriers and the two times in U.S. reserve fleets. From 1966 to 1969 she delivered cargo to Southeast Asia in the Vietnam War.

== History ==
=== World War II ===
Named after Whittier College in Whittier, California, the ship was built at the California Shipbuilding Yard (Calship) in Los Angeles, California in just 82 days and was delivered on 18 July 1945. The Whittier City and Whittier College was named for author John Greenleaf Whittier. SS Whittier Victory was the 798 of the 10,500-ton class known as Victory ships, built under the Emergency Shipbuilding program. Victory ships were designed to replace the earlier Liberty ships. Liberty ships were designed to be used solely for World War II. Victory ships were designed to last longer and serve the US Navy after the war. The Victory ship differed from a Liberty ship in that it was faster, longer, wider, taller, and had a thinner stack set farther toward the superstructure and a long raised forecastle. She was a United States Merchant Marine ship operated by the Moore-McCormack Lines for World war 2. She loaded up cargo at a few west coast ports and streamed to support the Pacific War. SS Whittier Victory delivered supplies in the island-hopping campaigns towards the Empire of Japan. As a Merchant Marine ship, she had a civilian crew to man the ship and US Navy Armed Guards to man the deck guns.

=== Post-World War II ===
After World War II many in Europe wanted to depart the war damaged cities. Argentina gave hope and new place to start for many immigrants. The Whittier Victory made two trip to Buenos Aires, Argentina. She arrived from Europe to Buenos Aires on 30 May 1946 and again on 16 April 1947.

In 1948 she was laid up at the National Defense Reserve Fleet at Mobile, Alabama and was later transferred to Defense Reserve at Beaumont, Texas.

=== Vietnam War ===
Whittier Victory was removed from the reserve fleet in 1966 and chartered to ferry military equipment to American forces in South Vietnam. On 28 January 1966 while getting ready to depart to the west coast and then Vietnam, while at her home port of New Orleans, a fire broke out aboard her as she was moored at her wharf in the Mississippi River. The fire caused an $6,000 of damage. The caused was found to be a overheated smokestack. She was undergoing repairs at the time most of the damage was to the smokestack Whittier Victory has the dangerous job of delivering 500 lb aerial bombs to for US Air Force B-52 bombers. It took her 21 days to travel from San Francisco to Saigon. In spring of 1968 the Whittier Victory survived repeated mortar and rocket attacks while in harbor at Newport bridge up river from Saigon. Other trips, like the one on 11 July 1968 she took supplies to Qui Nhơn in central Vietnam. In April 1969 she was put in drydock for normal use repair work. On her last trip, heading back to the United States, in August 1969, the Whittier Victory got caught in Hurricane Camille just before arriving at her home port in New Orleans. The SS Whittier Victory was removed from the reserve fleet and was taken to Tuxpan, Mexico on 14 October 1993 for scrapping.

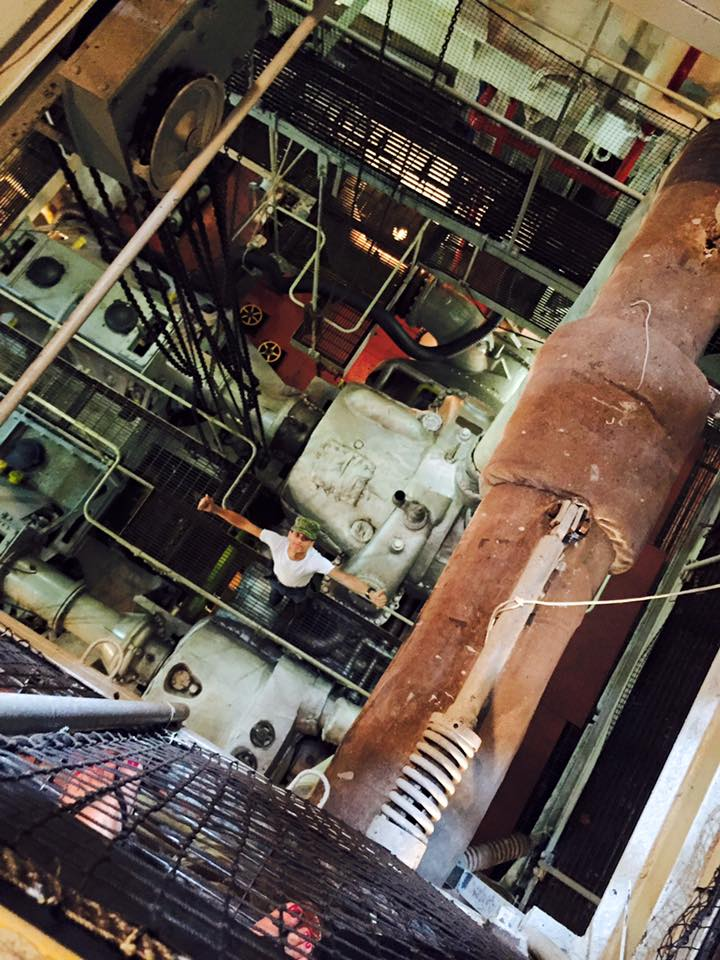
Engine room

== See also ==
- SS Maritime Victory, a similar VC2-S-AP2 Victory ship conversion into a dedicated troopship
- SS Lane Victory
- SS Red Oak Victory
- Liberty ship the previous line of cargo ships.
- List of Victory ships
- Type C1 ship
- Type C2 ship
- Type C3 ship
