= The Song of the Vermonters, 1779 =

Poem written by John Greenleaf Whittier

- by John Greenleaf Whittier
- Country: USA
- Language: English
- Publication date: 1833

"The Song of the Vermonters, 1779" Also known as "The Green Mountaineer" is a poem by the American Quaker poet John Greenleaf Whittier (December 17, 1807 – September 7, 1892) about the U.S. state of Vermont during its years of independence from 1777 to 1791, which are sometimes called the Vermont Republic.

== Overview ==
The ballad describes a period when Vermont deflected land claims from the British provinces of New Hampshire and New York.

Whittier originally wrote the poem in 1828. It was published anonymously by The New-England Magazine in 1833. Similarities in the last stanza with prose by Ethan Allen caused many to believe the entire work to be by Allen. For nearly sixty years the poem was republished with credit going to Ethan Allen. The confusion was perpetuated in part by Henry Stevens, a co-founder of the Vermont Historical Society. In 1843, Stevens presented the poem to the Society as one by Allen which he had "discovered". The discovery was also reported in the Vermont Chronicle. The poem was republished anonymously in England by the Northern Star in July 1847 in an issue which included two other poems by Whittier.

Whittier, however, had acknowledged his authorship in an obscure Massachusetts magazine in 1858. In preparing for an address at a centennial celebration in 1877, a resident of Bennington named Daniel Roberts asked Whittier to confirm his authorship. In July of that year, Whittier acknowledged authorship as "a boy's practical joke." As Whittier wrote in the Boston Transcript in March 1887:

'The Song of the Vermonters, by Ethan Allen,' was a piece of boyish mystification, written sixty years ago and printed anonymously. The only person who knew its authorship was my old friend Joseph T. Buckingham, and I supposed the secret died with him. We were both amused to find it regarded by antiquarian authorities as a genuine relic of the old times. How the secret was discovered, a few years ago, I have never known. I have never intentionally written anything in favor of war, but a great deal against it.

The poem was included in the 1904 Oxford Complete Edition of Whittier's poetry, The Poetical Works of John Greenleaf Whittier. Oxford Complete Edition.

== Full text ==
Ho–all to the borders! Vermonters, come down,
With your breeches of deerskin and jackets of brown;
With your red woollen caps and your moccasins come,
To the gathering summons of trumpet and drum.

Come down with your rifles! Let gray wolf and fox,
Howl on in the shade of their primitive rocks;
Let the bear feed securely from pig-pen and stall;
Here's two-legged game for your powder and ball.

On our south came the Dutchmen, enveloped in grease;
And arming for battle while canting of peace;
On our east crafty Meshech has gathered his band
To hang up our leaders and eat up our land.

Ho–all to the rescue! For Satan shall work,
No gain for his legions of Hampshire and York!
They claim our possessions–the pitiful knaves–
The tribute we pay shall be prisons and graves!

Let Clinton and Ten Broek with bribes in their hands,
Still seek to divide and parcel our lands;
We've coats for our traitors, whoever they are;
The warp is of feathers–the filling of tar:

Does the 'old Bay State' threaten? Does Congress complain?
Swarms Hampshire in arms on our borders again?
Bark the war dogs of Britain aloud on the lake–
Let 'em come; what they can they are welcome to take.

What seek they among us? The pride of our wealth,
Is comfort, contentment, and labor, and health,
And lands which, as Freemen we only have trod,
Independent of all, save the mercies of God.

Yet we owe no allegiance, we bow to no throne,
Our ruler is law and the law is our own;
Our leaders themselves are our own fellow-men,
Who can handle the sword, or the scythe, or the pen.

Our wives are all true, and our daughters are fair,
With their blue eyes of smiles and their light flowing hair,
All brisk at their wheels till the dark even-fall,
Then blithe at the sleigh-ride the husking and ball!

We've sheep on the hillsides, we've cows on the plain,
And gay-tasselled corn-fields and rank-growing grain;
There are deer on the mountains, and wood-pigeons fly
From the crack of our muskets, like clouds on the sky.

And there's fish in our streamlets and rivers which take
Their course from the hills to our broad bosomed lake;
Through rock-arched Winooski the salmon leaps free,
And the portly shad follows all fresh from the sea.

Like a sunbeam the pickerel glides through the pool,
And the spotted trout sleeps where the water is cool,
Or darts from his shelter of rock and of root,
At the beaver's quick plunge, or the angler's pursuit.

And ours are the mountains, which awfully rise,
Till they rest their green heads on the blue of the skies;
And ours are the forests unwasted, unshorn,
Save where the wild path of the tempest is torn.

And though savage and wild be this climate of ours,
And brief be our season of fruits and of flowers,
Far dearer the blast round our mountains which raves,
Than the sweet summer zephyr which breathes over slaves!

Hurrah for Vermont! For the land which we till
Must have sons to defend her from valley and hill;
Leave the harvest to rot on the fields where it grows,
And the reaping of wheat for the reaping of foes

From far Michiscom's wild valley, to where
Poosoonsuck steals down from his wood-circled lair,
From Shocticook River to Lutterlock town
Ho–all to the rescue! Vermonters come down!

Come York or come Hampshire, come traitors or knaves,
If ye rule o'er our land ye shall rule o'er our graves;
Our vow is recorded–our banner unfurled,
In the name of Vermont we defy all the world!

== Revised Lyrics ==
(The modern interpretation of the lyrics now commonly used)

Ho–all to the borders! Vermonters, come down,
With your breeches of deerskin and jackets of brown;
With your red woollen caps and your moccasins come,
To the gathering summons of trumpet and drum.

Come down with your rifles! Let gray wolf and fox,
Howl on in the shadow of primitive rocks;
Let the bear feed securely from pig-pen and stall;
Here's two-legged game for your powder and ball.

Refrain:
Then cheer, cheer, the Green Mountaineer !
Then cheer, cheer, the Green Mountaineer !

On our south came the Hessians, our land to police;
And arming for battle while canting of peace;
On our east came the British, the red coated band,
To hang up our leaders and eat up our land.

Ho–all to the rescue! For Satan shall work,
No gain for his legions of Hampshire and York!
They claim our possessions–the pitiful knaves–
The tribute we pay shall be prisons and graves!

[Refrain]

We owe no allegiance, we bow to no throne,
Our ruler is law and the law is our own;
Our leaders themselves are our own fellow-men,
Who can handle the sword, or the scythe, or the pen.

Hurrah for Vermont! For the land which we till
Must have sons to defend her from valley and hill;
Our vow is recorded–our banner unfurled,
In the name of Vermont we defy all the world!

[Refrain]
