= Spay =

Spay may refer to:

- Spaying, the neutering of a female animal
- Spay, Germany, a municipality in Rhineland-Palatinate, Germany
- Spay, Sarthe, a commune in the Sarthe departement, France
- SPAY, the ICAO airport code for Tnte. Gral. Gerardo Pérez Pinedo Airport in Atalaya, Peru

== See also ==
- Spey (disambiguation)
