= John Greenleaf Whittier =

American Quaker poet and abolitionist (1807–1892)

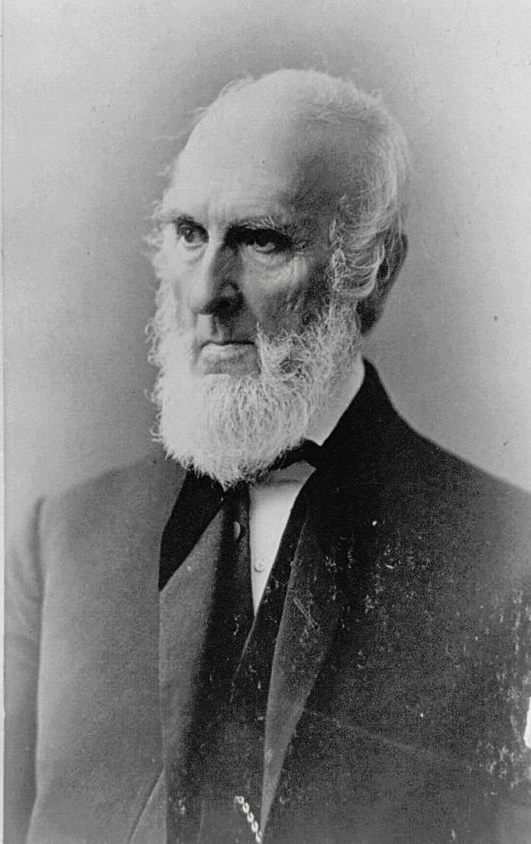
- John Greenleaf Whittier, 1885
- Born: December 17, 1807; Haverhill, Massachusetts, U.S.
- Died: September 7, 1892 (aged 84); Hampton Falls, New Hampshire, U.S.
- Occupations: Editor, poet
- Relatives: Elizabeth Hussey Whittier (sister)

Signature
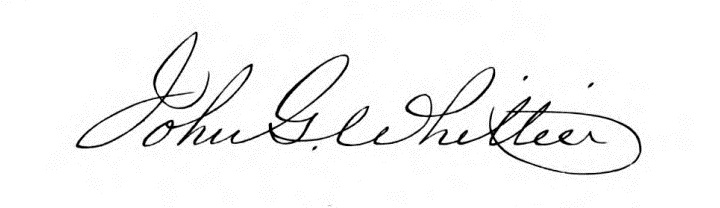

John Greenleaf Whittier (December 17, 1807 – September 7, 1892) was an American Quaker poet and advocate of the abolition of slavery in the United States. Frequently listed as one of the fireside poets, he was influenced by the Scottish poet Robert Burns. Whittier is remembered particularly for his anti-slavery writings, as well as his 1866 book Snow-Bound.

== Early life and education ==
Whittier was born to John and Abigail (née Hussey) Whittier at their rural homestead in Haverhill, Massachusetts, on December 17, 1807. His middle name is thought to mean feuillevert, after his Huguenot forebears. He grew up on the farm in a household with his parents, a brother and two sisters, a maternal aunt and paternal uncle, and a constant flow of visitors and hired hands for the farm. As a boy, it was discovered that Whittier was color-blind when he was unable to see a difference between ripe and unripe strawberries.

The farm was not very profitable, and there was only enough money to get by. Whittier himself was not cut out for hard farm labor and suffered from bad health and physical frailty his whole life. Although he received little formal education, he was an avid reader who studied his father's six books on Quakerism until their teachings became the foundation of his ideology. Whittier was heavily influenced by the doctrines of his religion, particularly its stress on humanitarianism, compassion, and social responsibility.

== Career ==
Whittier was first introduced to poetry by a teacher. His sister Mary Whittier sent his first poem, "The Deity", to the Newburyport Free Press without his permission, and its editor, William Lloyd Garrison, published it on June 8, 1826. Garrison, as well as another local editor, encouraged Whittier to attend the recently opened Haverhill Academy. To raise money to attend the school, Whittier became a shoemaker for a time, and a deal was made to pay part of his tuition with food from the family farm. Before his second term, he earned money to cover tuition by serving as a teacher in a one-room schoolhouse in what is now Merrimac, Massachusetts. He attended Haverhill Academy from 1827 to 1828 and completed a high school education in only two terms.

Whittier received the first substantial public praise for his work from critic John Neal via Neal's magazine The Yankee in 1828. Whittier valued the opinion of the older and more established writer, pledging that if Neal did not like his writing, "I will quit poetry, and everything also of a literary nature, for I am sick at heart of the business." In an 1829 letter, Neal told Whittier to "Persevere, and I am sure you will have your reward in every way." Reading Neal's 1828 novel Rachel Dyer inspired Whittier to weave New England witchcraft lore into his own stories and poems.

Garrison gave Whittier the job of editor of the National Philanthropist, a Boston-based temperance weekly. Shortly after a change in management, Garrison reassigned him as editor of the weekly American Manufacturer in Boston. Whittier became an outspoken critic of President Andrew Jackson, and by 1830 was editor of the prominent New England Weekly Review in Hartford, Connecticut, the most influential Whig journal in New England. He published "The Song of the Vermonters, 1779" anonymously in The New-England Magazine in 1838. The poem was mistakenly attributed to Ethan Allen for nearly sixty years. Whittier acknowledged his authorship in 1858.

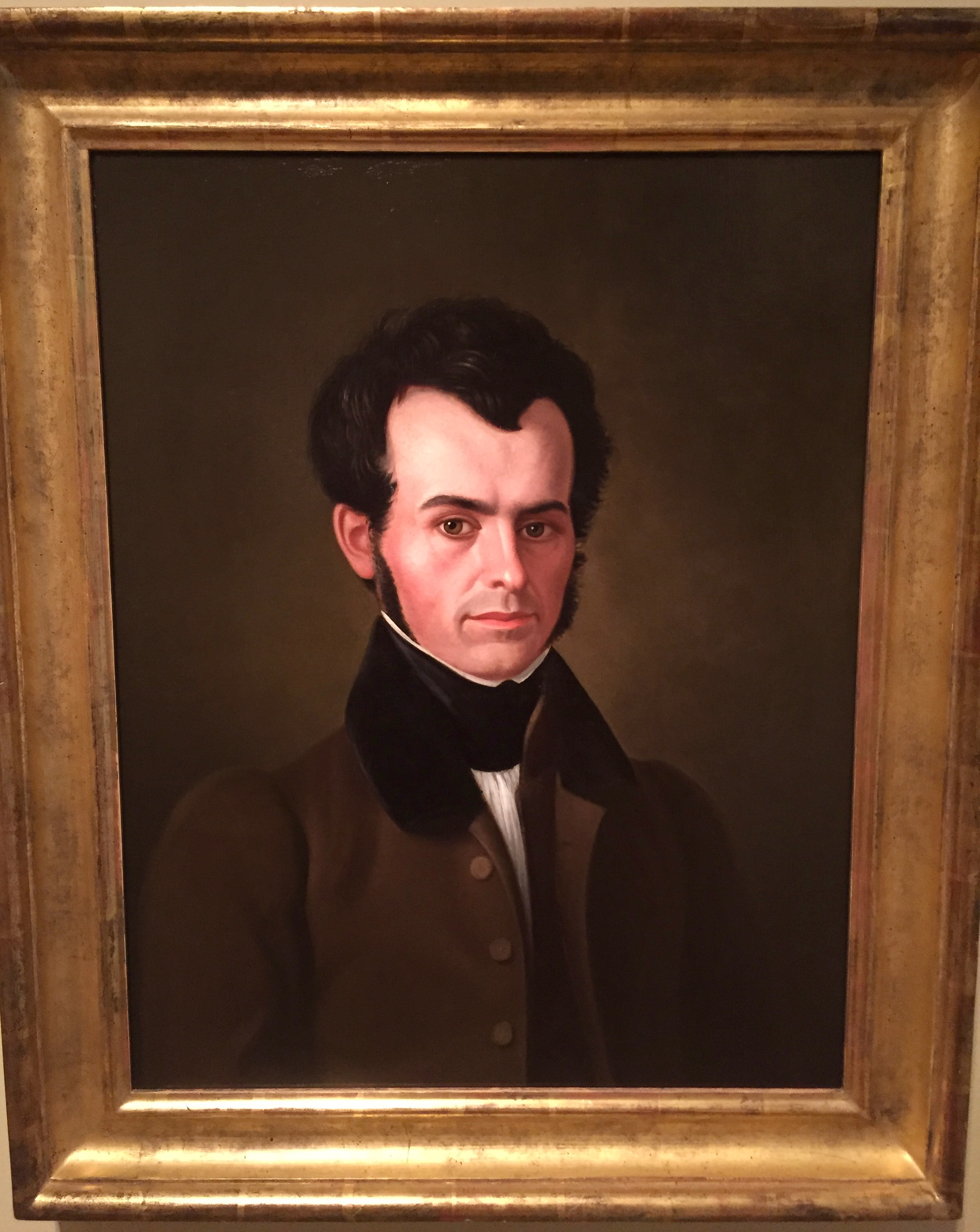
Oil on canvas painting of John Greenleaf Whittier by Robert Peckham (artist) (1833). Housed at the John Greenleaf Whittier House.

=== Abolitionist activity ===
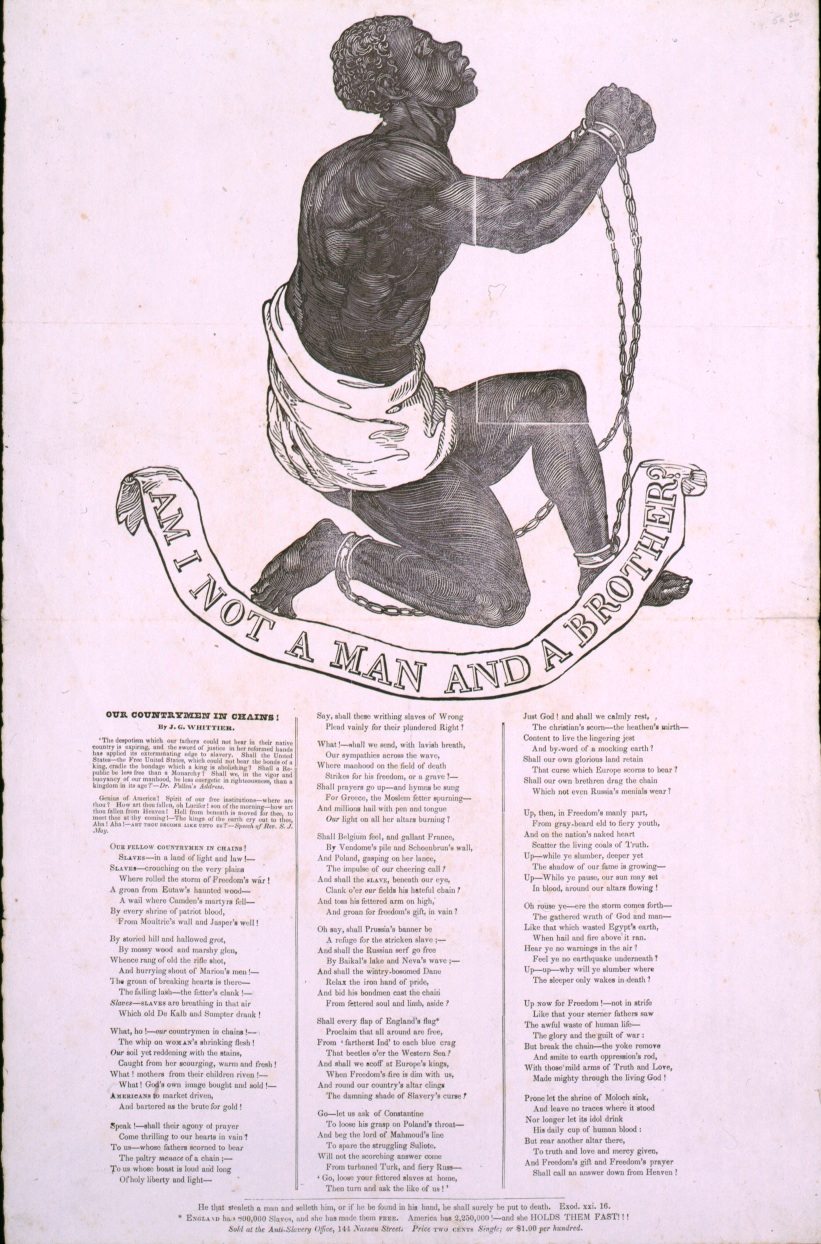
Broadside publication of Whittier's Our Countrymen in Chains

During the 1830s, Whittier became interested in politics, but after losing a congressional election at age 25, he suffered a nervous breakdown and returned home. The year 1833 was a turning point for Whittier; he resurrected his correspondence with Garrison, and the passionate abolitionist began to encourage the young Quaker to join his cause.

In 1833, Whittier published the antislavery pamphlet Justice and Expediency, and from there dedicated the next twenty years of his life to the abolitionist cause. The controversial pamphlet destroyed all of his political hopes, as his demand for immediate emancipation alienated both Northern businessmen and Southern slaveholders, but it also sealed his commitment to a cause that he deemed morally correct and socially necessary. He was a founding member of the American Anti-Slavery Society and signed the Anti-Slavery Declaration of 1833, which he often considered the most significant action of his life.

Whittier's political skill made him useful as a lobbyist, and his willingness to badger anti-slavery congressional leaders into joining the abolitionist cause was invaluable. From 1835 to 1838, he traveled widely in the North, attending conventions, securing votes, speaking to the public, and lobbying politicians. As he did so, Whittier received his fair share of violent responses, being several times mobbed, stoned, and run out of town.

From 1838 to 1840, he was editor of the Pennsylvania Freeman in Philadelphia, one of the leading antislavery papers in the North, formerly known as the National Enquirer. In May 1838, the publication moved its offices to the newly opened Pennsylvania Hall on North Sixth Street, which was shortly after burned by a pro-slavery mob. Whittier continued to write poetry, and nearly all of his poems then dealt with the problem of slavery.

In 1838, Charles G. Atherton of New Hampshire presented five resolutions that were adopted and created a new resolution that barred Congress from discussing petitions that mentioned bringing slavery to an end. Congress approved them on December 12, 1838, which became known as the "Atherton Gag"; Whittier referred to Atherton in one of his many abolition poems as "vile" by having allied himself so closely with his fellow Democrats from pro-slavery South. It was not until 1844 the House rescinded that gag rule on a motion made by John Quincy Adams.

By the end of the 1830s, the unity of the abolitionist movement had begun to fracture. Whittier stuck to his belief that moral action apart from political effort was futile. He knew that success required legislative change, not merely moral suasion. That opinion alone engendered a bitter split from Garrison, and Whittier went on to become a founding member of the Liberty Party in 1839. In 1840, he attended the World Anti-Slavery Convention in London. By 1843, he was announcing the triumph of the fledgling party: "Liberty party is no longer an experiment. It is vigorous reality, exerting... a powerful influence." Whittier unsuccessfully encouraged Ralph Waldo Emerson and Henry Wadsworth Longfellow to join the party. He took editing jobs with the Middlesex Standard in Lowell, Massachusetts, and the Essex Transcript in Amesbury until 1844. While in Lowell, he met Lucy Larcom, who became a lifelong friend.

In 1845, he began writing his essay "The Black Man" which included an anecdote about John Fountain, a free black who was jailed in Virginia for helping slaves to escape. After his release, Fountain went on a speaking tour and thanked Whittier for writing his story.

Around then, the stresses of editorial duties, worsening health, and dangerous mob violence caused Whittier to have a physical breakdown. He went home to Amesbury and remained there for the rest of his life, ending his active participation in abolition. Even so, he continued to believe that the best way to gain abolitionist support was to broaden the Liberty Party's political appeal, and Whittier persisted in advocating the addition of other issues to its platform. He eventually participated in the evolution of the Liberty Party into the Free Soil Party, and some say his greatest political feat was convincing Charles Sumner to run on the Free-Soil ticket for the U.S. Senate in 1850.

Beginning in 1847, Whittier was the editor of Gamaliel Bailey's The National Era, one of the most influential abolitionist newspapers in the North. For the next ten years, it featured the best of his writing, both as prose and poetry. Being confined to his home and away from the action offered Whittier a chance to write better abolitionist poetry, and he was even poet laureate for his party. Whittier's poems often used slavery to represent all kinds of oppression (physical, spiritual, economic), and his poems stirred up popular response because they appealed to feelings, rather than logic.

Whittier produced two collections of antislavery poetry: Poems Written during the Progress of the Abolition Question in the United States, between 1830 and 1838 and Voices of Freedom (1846).

=== Civil War years ===
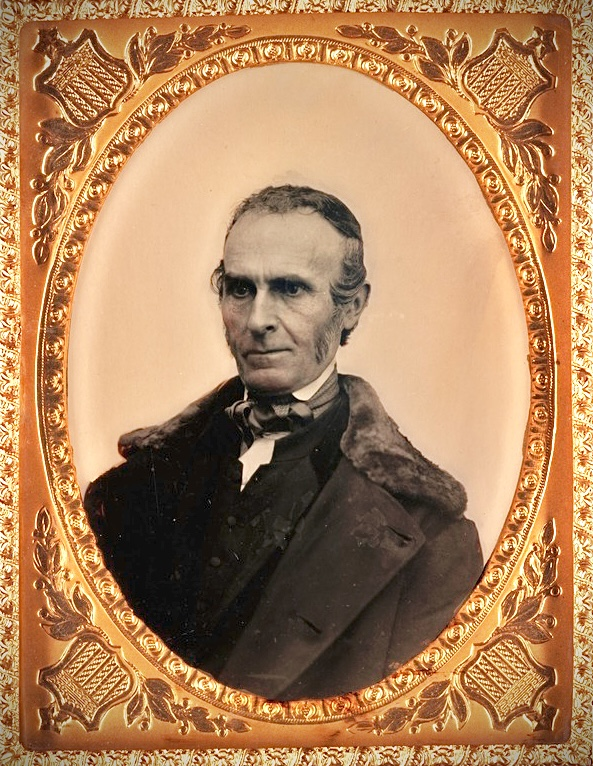
Daguerreotype of John Greenleaf Whittier, c. 1855–60

He was an elector in the presidential election of 1860 and of 1864 for Abraham Lincoln both times. In the months leading up to the American Civil War, Whittier built a strong national audience. In January 1861, The Atlantic Monthly, which had previous spurned his poetry, praised him for his "keen and discriminating love of right" and his "love of freedom".

In 1864, the North American Review responded to Whittier's collection In War Time, and Other Poems, by calling him "on the whole, the most American of all our poets, and there is a fire of warlike patriotism in him that burns all the more intensely that is smothered by his [Quaker] creed".

The passage of the Thirteenth Amendment in 1865 ended both slavery and his public cause, and so Whittier turned to other forms of poetry for the remainder of his life.

=== Later life ===
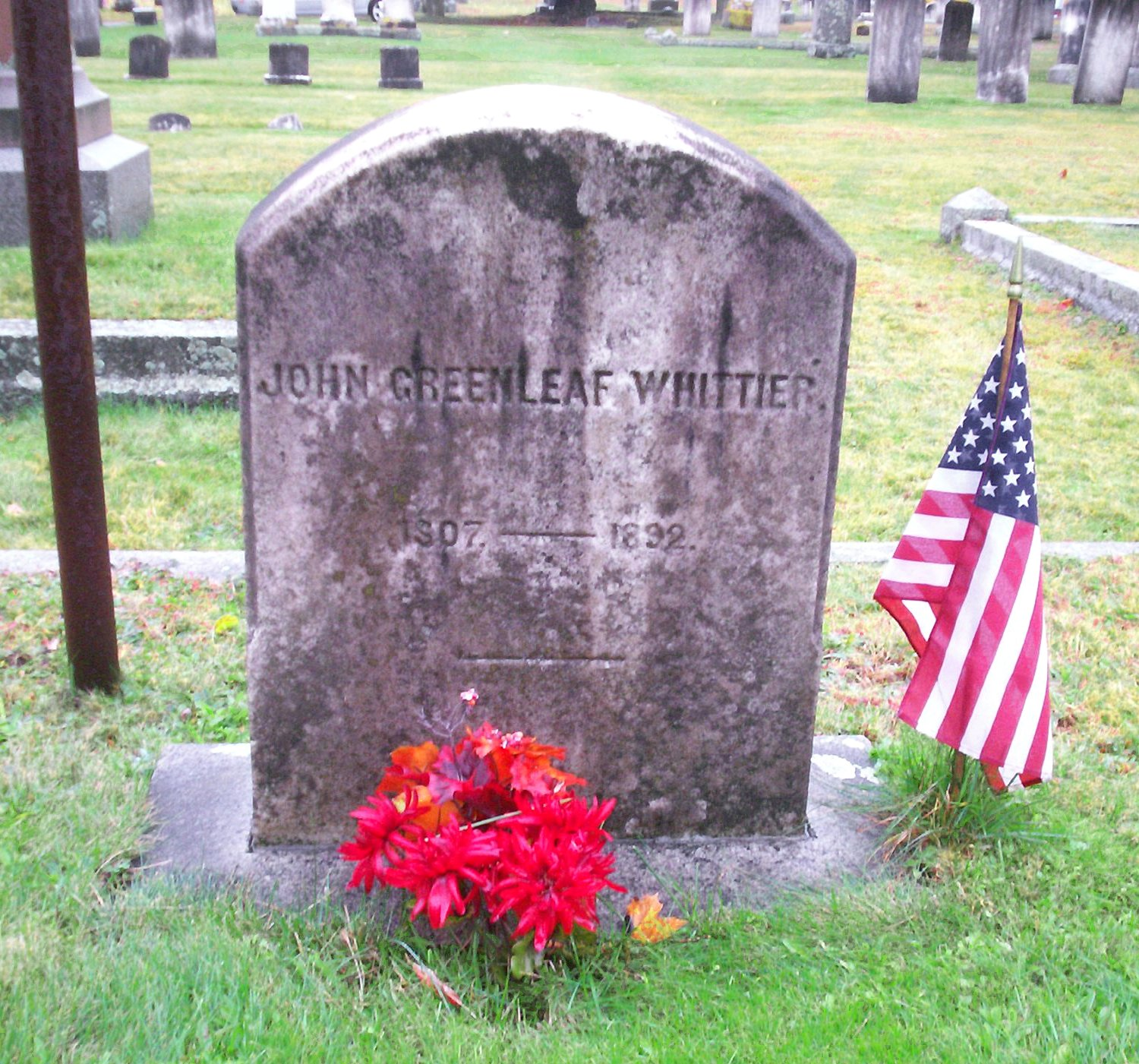
Whittier's grave in Amesbury, Massachusetts

One of his most enduring works, Snow-Bound, was first published in 1866. Whittier was surprised by its financial success; he earned $10,000 from the first edition. In 1867, Whittier asked James T. Fields to get him a ticket to a reading by Charles Dickens during the British author's visit to the United States. After the event, Whittier wrote a letter describing his experience:

My eyes ached all next day from the intensity of my gazing. I do not think his voice naturally particularly fine, but he uses it with great effect. He has wonderful dramatic power ... I like him better than any public reader I have ever before heard.

He was elected to the American Philosophical Society in 1870.

Whittier spent the last winters of his life, from 1876 to 1892, at Oak Knoll, the home of his cousins in Danvers, Massachusetts.

Whittier spent the summer of 1892 at the home of a cousin in Hampton Falls, New Hampshire, where he wrote his last poem (a tribute to Oliver Wendell Holmes Sr.) and where he was captured in a final photograph. He died at this home on September 7, 1892, and was buried in Amesbury, Massachusetts.

== Poetry ==
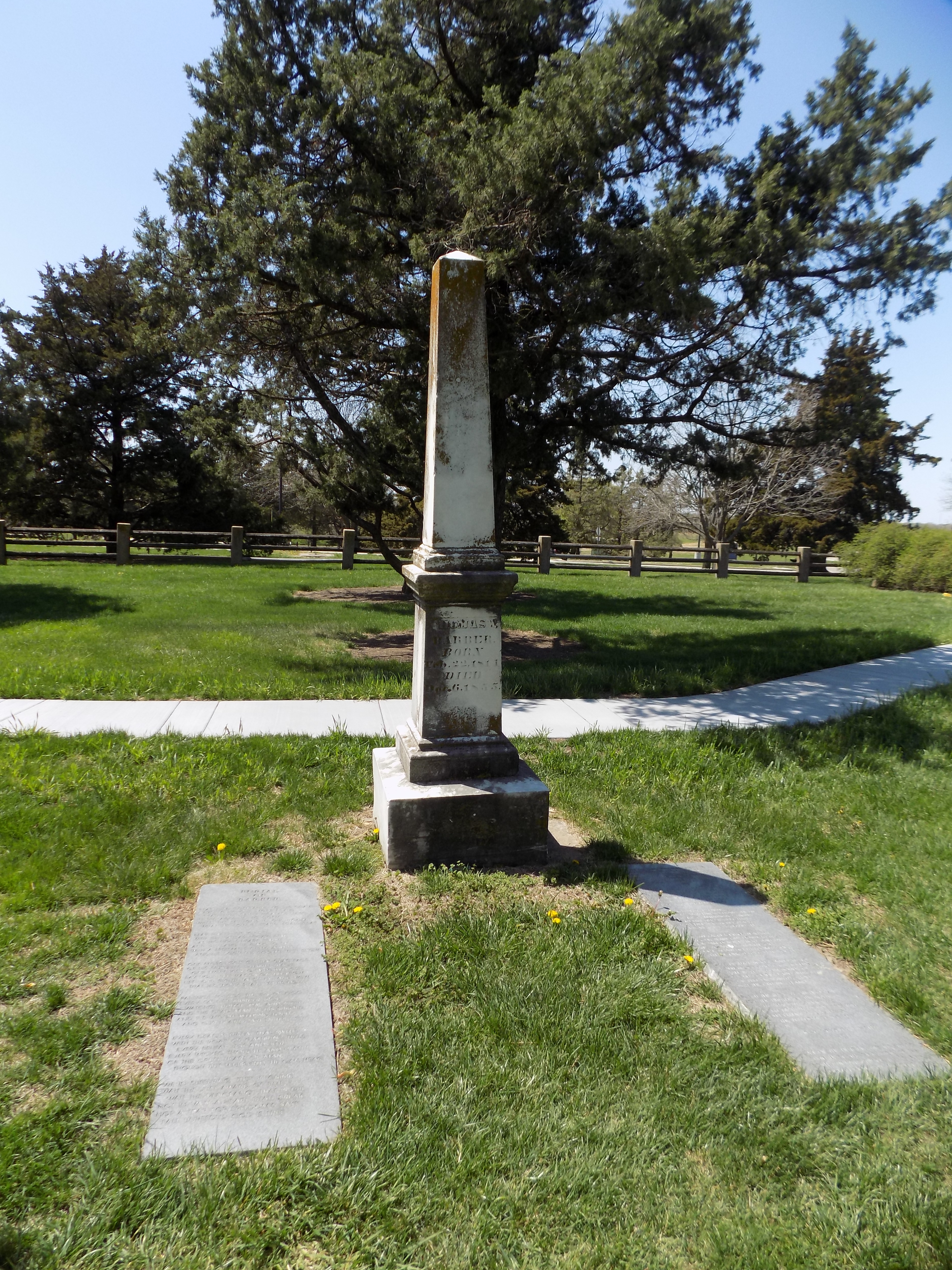
John Greenleaf Whittier's poem "Burial of Barber" was inspired by the burial of abolitionist T. W. Barber (whose tomb is pictured in 2018).

Whittier's first two published books were Legends of New England (1831) and the poem Moll Pitcher (1832). In 1833 he published The Song of the Vermonters, 1779, which he had anonymously inserted in The New England Magazine. The poem was erroneously attributed to Ethan Allen for nearly sixty years. This use of poetry in the service of his political beliefs is illustrated by his book Poems Written during the Progress of the Abolition Question.

Highly regarded in his lifetime and for a period thereafter, he is now largely remembered for his anti-slavery writings and his poems "The Barefoot Boy", "Maud Muller", Snow-Bound, and Barbara Frietchie. The latter poem, published in 1863, was read for generations by American school children. It is the possibly apocryphal recounting of an elderly woman named Barbara Fritchie (or Frietchie) and her defiant response to Confederate troops marching past her home in Frederick, Maryland during the Civil War. The poem was so well-known that British Prime Minister Winston Churchill, while driving through Frederick with Franklin Roosevelt during a visit to the United States in May 1943, recited the entire poem from memory.

A number of his poems have been turned into hymns, including Dear Lord and Father of Mankind, taken from his poem "The Brewing of Soma". The latter part of the poem was set in 1924 by Dr. George Gilbert Stocks to the tune of Repton by English composer Hubert Parry from the 1888 oratorio Judith. It is also sung as the hymn Rest by Frederick Maker, and Charles Ives also set a part of it to music in his song "Serenity".

Whittier's Quakerism is better illustrated, however, by the hymn that begins:

O Brother Man, fold to thy heart thy brother:
Where pity dwells, the peace of God is there;
To worship rightly is to love each other,
Each smile a hymn, each kindly deed a prayer.

His sometimes contrasting sense of the need for strong action against injustice can be seen in his poem "To Rönge" in honor of Johannes Ronge, the German religious figure and rebel leader of the 1848 rebellion in Germany:

Thy work is to hew down. In God's name then:
Put nerve into thy task. Let other men;
Plant, as they may, that better tree whose fruit,
The wounded bosom of the Church shall heal.

Whittier's "At Port Royal 1861" describes the experience of Northern abolitionists arriving at Port Royal, South Carolina, as teachers and missionaries for the slaves who had been left behind when their owners fled because the Union Navy would arrive to blockade the coast. The poem includes the "Song of the Negro Boatmen," written in dialect:

Oh, praise an' tanks! De Lord he come
To set de people free;
An' massa tink it day ob doom,
An' we ob jubilee.
De Lord dat heap de Red Sea waves
He jus' as 'trong as den;

He say de word: we las' night slaves;
To-day, de Lord's freemen.
De yam will grow, de cotton blow,
We'll hab de rice an' corn:
Oh, nebber you fear, if nebber you hear
De driver blow his horn!

Of all the poetry inspired by the Civil War, the "Song of the Negro Boatmen" was one of the most widely printed, and, although Whittier never actually visited Port Royal, an abolitionist working there described his "Song of the Negro Boatmen" as "wonderfully applicable as we were being rowed across Hilton Head Harbor among United States gunboats."

== Criticism ==
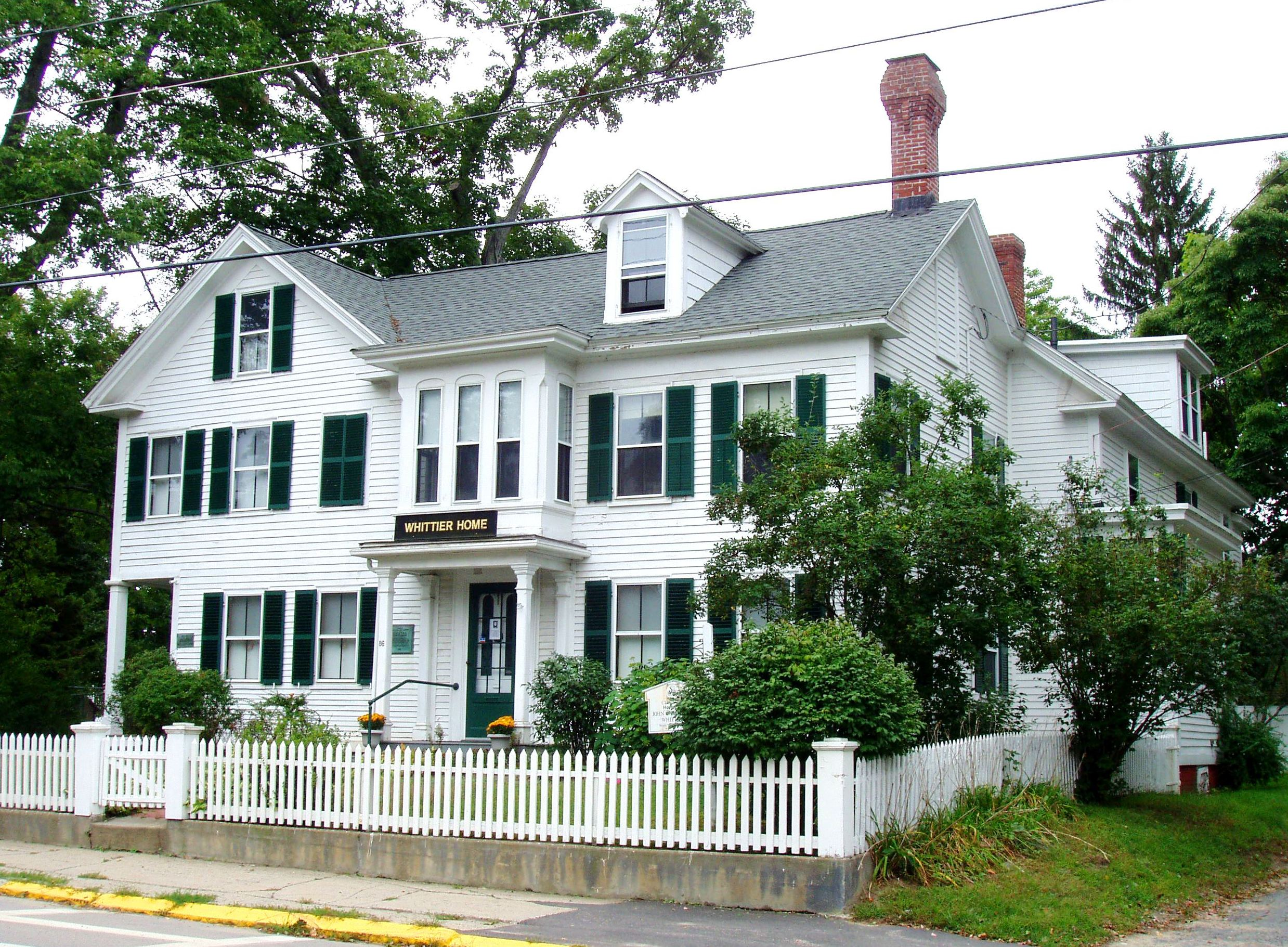
The John Greenleaf Whittier Home in Amesbury, Massachusetts

Nathaniel Hawthorne dismissed Whittier's Literary Recreations and Miscellanies (1854): "Whittier's book is poor stuff! I like the man, but have no high opinion either of his poetry or his prose." Editor George Ripley, however, found Whittier's poetry refreshing and said it had a "stately movement of versification, grandeur of imagery, a vein of tender and solemn pathos, cheerful trust" and a "pure and ennobling character". Boston critic Edwin Percy Whipple noted Whittier's moral and ethical tone mingled with sincere emotion. He wrote, "In reading this last volume, I feel as if my soul had taken a bath in holy water." Later scholars and critics questioned the depth of Whittier's poetry. One was Karl Keller, who noted, "Whittier has been a writer to love, not to belabor."

== Influence and legacy ==
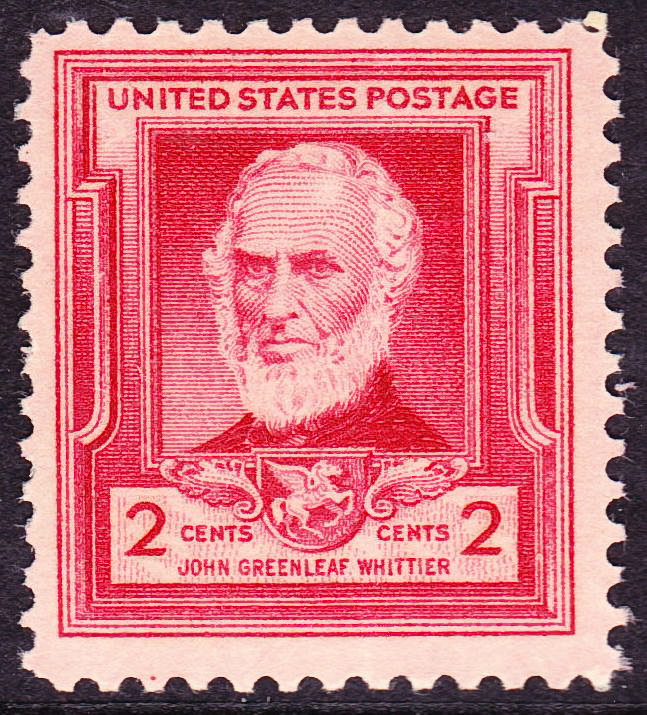
United States postal stamp of Whittier, issued in 1940

Whittier was particularly supportive of women writers, including Alice Cary, Phoebe Cary, Sarah Orne Jewett, Lucy Larcom, and Celia Thaxter. He was especially influential on prose writings by Jewett, with whom he shared a belief in the moral quality of literature and an interest in New England folklore. Jewett dedicated one of her books to him and modeled several of her characters after people in Whittier's life.

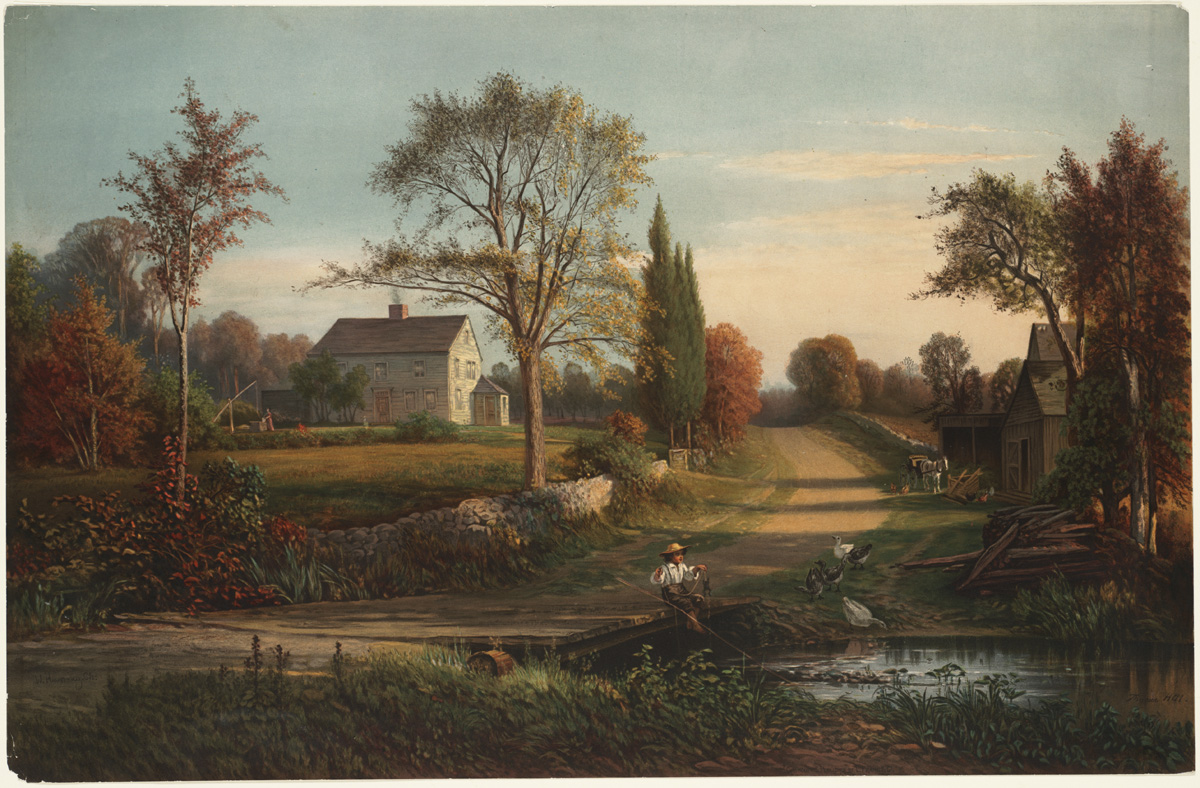
Whittier's Birthplace, by Thomas Hill

Whittier's family farm, known as the John Greenleaf Whittier Homestead or simply "Whittier's Birthplace", is now a historic site open to the public. His later residence in Amesbury, where he lived for 56 years, is also open to the public, and is now known as the John Greenleaf Whittier Home. Whittier's hometown of Haverhill has named many buildings and landmarks in his honor including J.G. Whittier Middle School, Greenleaf Elementary, and Whittier Regional Vocational Technical High School. Numerous other schools around the country also bear his name.

The John Greenleaf Whittier Bridge, built in the style of the Sagamore and Bourne bridges, carries Interstate 95 from Amesbury to Newburyport over the Merrimack River. A covered bridge spanning the Bearcamp River in Ossipee, New Hampshire, is also named for Whittier.

The city of Whittier, California, is named after the poet, as are the communities of Whittier, Alaska, Greenleaf, Idaho, and Whittier, Iowa; the Minneapolis neighborhood of Whittier; the Whittier neighborhoods of Denver and Boulder, Colorado, as well as a school and a park there. Both Whittier College and Whittier Law School are named after him. A park in the Saint Boniface area of Winnipeg is named after the poet in recognition of his poem "The Red River Voyageur". Whittier Education Campus in Washington, DC, is named in his honor. SS Whittier Victory a World War II ship named after Whittier College. Whittier Peak and Mount Whittier in Washington and Mount Whittier in New Hampshire are mountains named after him.

The alternate history story P.'s Correspondence (1846) by Nathaniel Hawthorne, considered the first such story ever published in English, includes the notice "Whittier, a fiery Quaker youth, to whom the muse had perversely assigned a battle-trumpet, got himself lynched, in South Carolina". The date of that event in Hawthorne's invented timeline was 1835.

Whittier was one of thirteen writers in the 1897 card game Authors, which referenced his writings "Laus Deo", "Among the Hills", Snow-bound, and "The Eternal Goodness". He was removed from the card game when it was reissued in 1987.

Whitter's poem "Twilight" was set to music in 1932 by Edwin Fowles.

In 2020, a statue previously erected in his honor in Whittier, California, was defaced with antislavery and Black Lives Matter slogans by vandals. He had never owned slaves.

== List of works ==
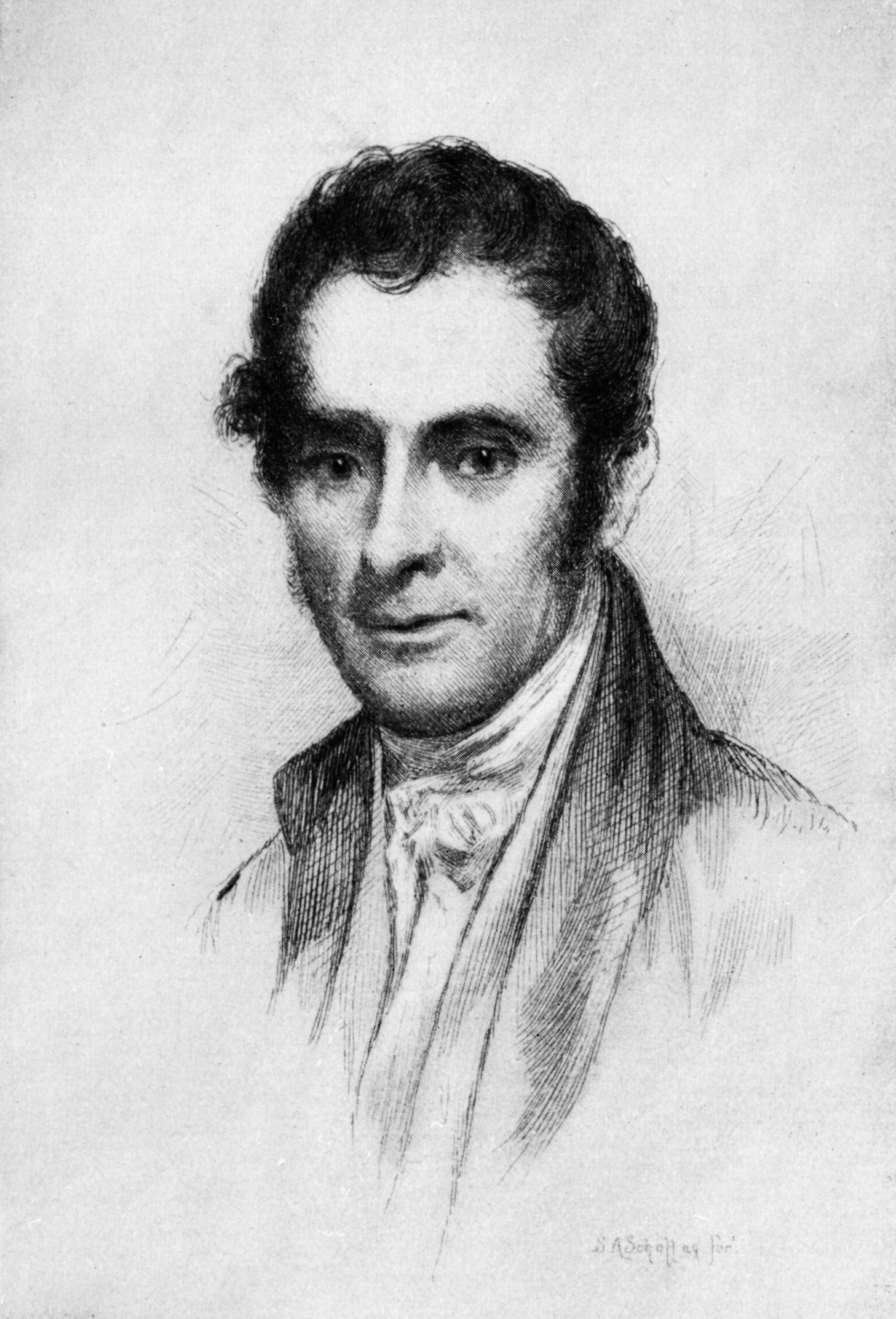
Whittier at age 29

Poetry collections

- Poems written during the Progress of the Abolition Question in the United States (1837)
- Lays of My Home (1843)
- Voices of Freedom (1846)
- Songs of Labor (1850)
- The Chapel of the Hermits (1853)
- Le Marais du Cygne (September 1858 Atlantic Monthly)
- Home Ballads (1860)
- The Furnace Blast (1862)
- Maud Muller (1856)
- In War Time (1864)
- Snow-Bound (1866)
- The Tent on the Beach (1867)
- Among the Hills (1869)
- Ballads of New England (1870)
- Whittier's Poems, Complete Edition (1874)
- The Pennsylvania Pilgrim (1872)
- The Vision of Echard (1878)
- The King's Missive (1881)
- Saint Gregory's Guest (1886)
- At Sundown (1890)

Prose

- The Stranger in Lowell (1845)
- The Supernaturalism of New England (1847)
- Leaves from Margaret Smith's Journal (1849)
- Old Portraits and Modern Sketches (1850)
- Literary Recreations and Miscellanies (1854)

== Sources ==
- Laurie, Bruce. Beyond Garrison: Antislavery and Social Reform. New York: Cambridge University Press, 2005. ISBN 0-521-60517-2
- Wagenknecht, Edward. John Greenleaf Whittier: A Portrait in Paradox. New York: Oxford University Press, 1967.
- Woodwell, Roland H. John Greenleaf Whittier: A Biography. Haverhill, Massachusetts: Trustees of the John Greenleaf Whittier Homestead, 1985.
- Claus Bernet (2011). "John Greenleaf Whittier". In Bautz, Traugott (ed.). Biographisch-Bibliographisches Kirchenlexikon (BBKL) (in German). Vol. 32. Nordhausen: Bautz. cols. 1492–1500. ISBN 978-3-88309-615-5.
