= Robert Peckham (artist) =

American painter

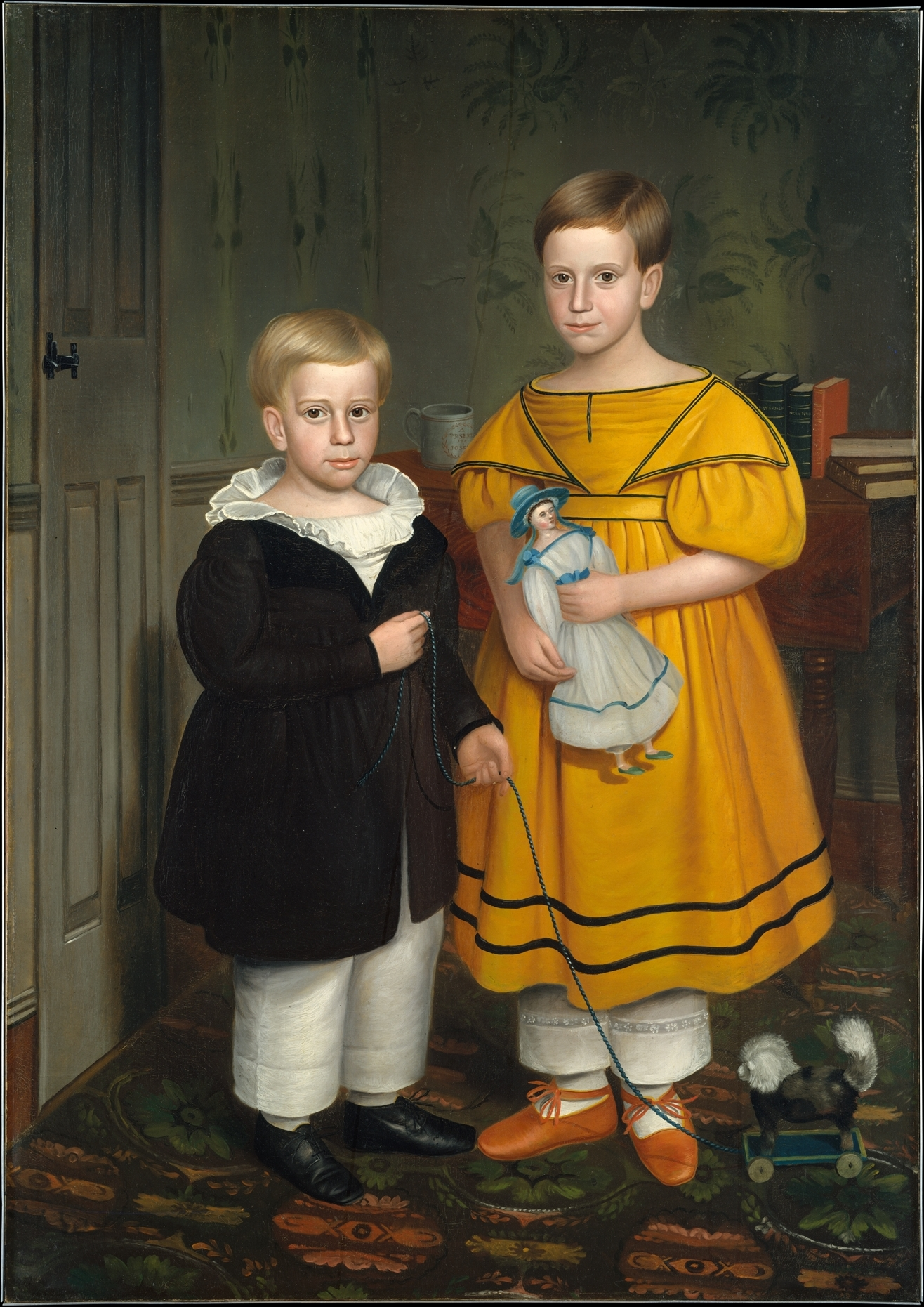
The Raymond Children

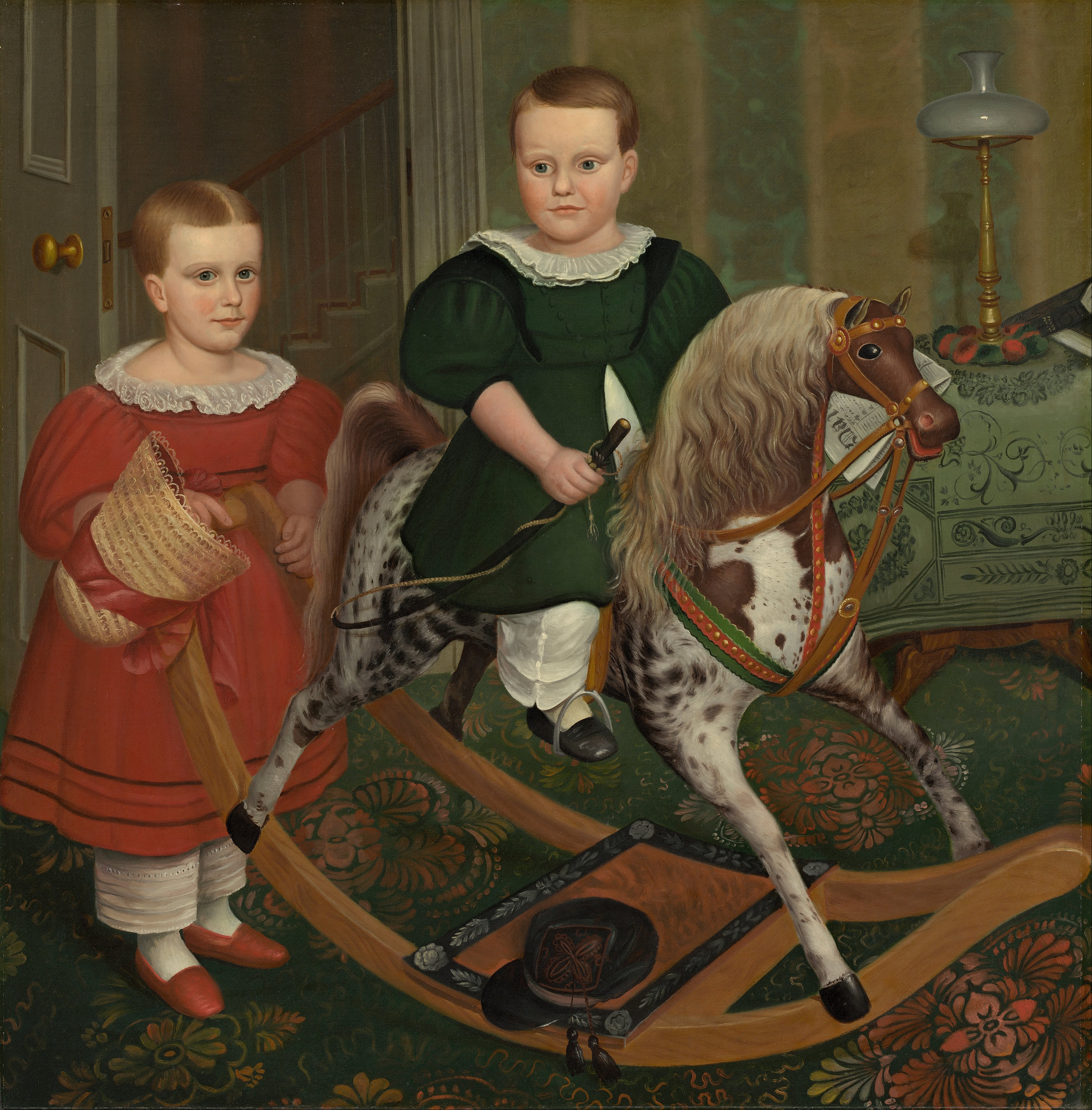
The Hobby Horse (c.1840)

Robert Peckham (10 September 1785, Petersham, Massachusetts – 29 June 1877, Westminster, Massachusetts) was an American painter in the folk art tradition; known primarily for his portraits of children. He is often referred to as Deacon Peckham.

== Biography ==
Nothing is known of his childhood. In 1813, he married Ruth Sawyer of Boston. To accommodate their growing family, which eventually numbered nine children, they settled in Westminster in 1821. Seven years later, he became a deacon at the local Congregational Church. A man of strong moral beliefs, he was a promoter of temperance and an ardent opponent of slavery. According to one of his daughters, their home was a stop on the Underground Railroad. Subsequent research into Westminster history has confirmed this.

His outspoken advocacy on this issue caused a rift with his church, due to what they felt was overzealousness on his part and, when his wife died in 1842, he resigned his position; although he would continue to be called "Deacon" for the remainder of his life. He remarried the following year. In 1850, he was excommunicated by the church and he moved his family to Worcester. In 1863, following the Emancipation Proclamation, he was reinstated and returned to Westminster. After that, his life appears to have been uneventful.

His painting career began in 1809, when he took some lessons from Ethan Allen Greenwood, making him one of the few folk artists with any record of formal studies. Later that year, he painted his first portrait. As with most amateur artists he was, at first, primarily a painter of signs and other workaday objects. In 1815, he and his brother Samuel placed an advertisement in the Hampshire Gazette, offering their services for "House, sign and ornamental painting. Also gilding, glazing and varnishing".

By the 1830s and 1840s, he was producing brilliantly colored portraits of children in detailed domestic surroundings. An advertisement in the Massachusetts Spy from 1834 announced the opening of his portrait painting business. He charged ten dollars per portrait. These works offer a stark contrast to the darker paintings of adults he produced before and after that period, leading some to question if both groups of paintings are actually his. As with most folk artists, very few are signed, making attribution difficult. A portrait of the poet John Greenleaf Whittier is, however, attested to by Whittier himself, in somewhat dismissive terms. Much later, it was discovered that Whittier approved of the portrait after all.

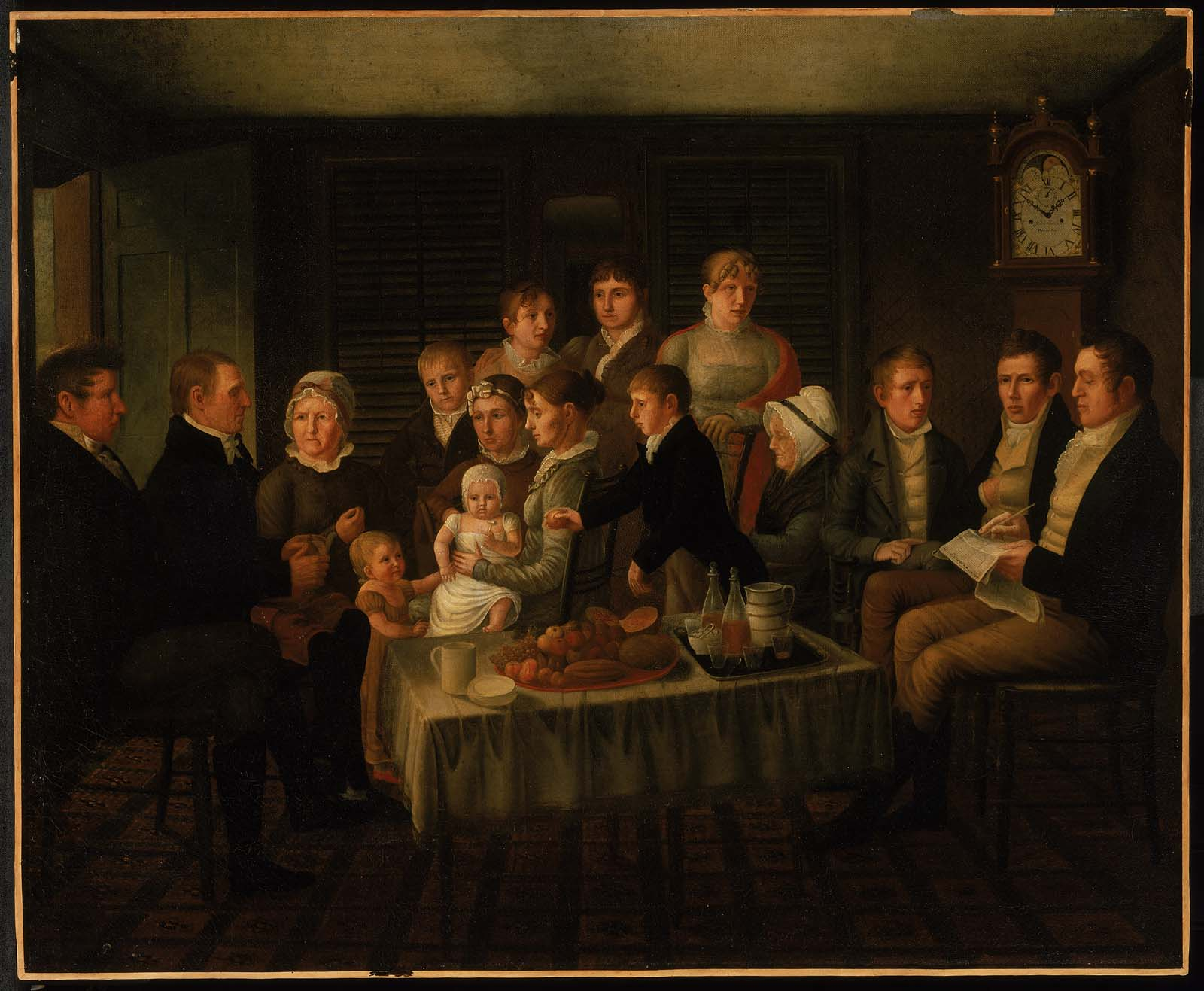

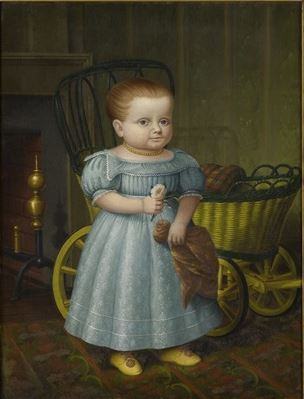

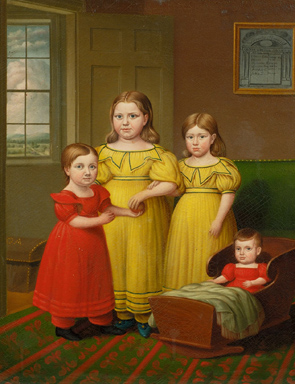

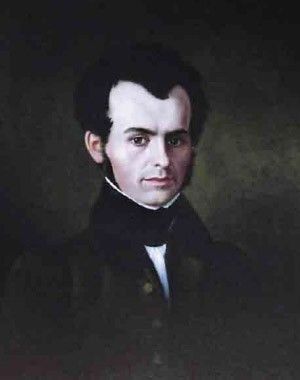

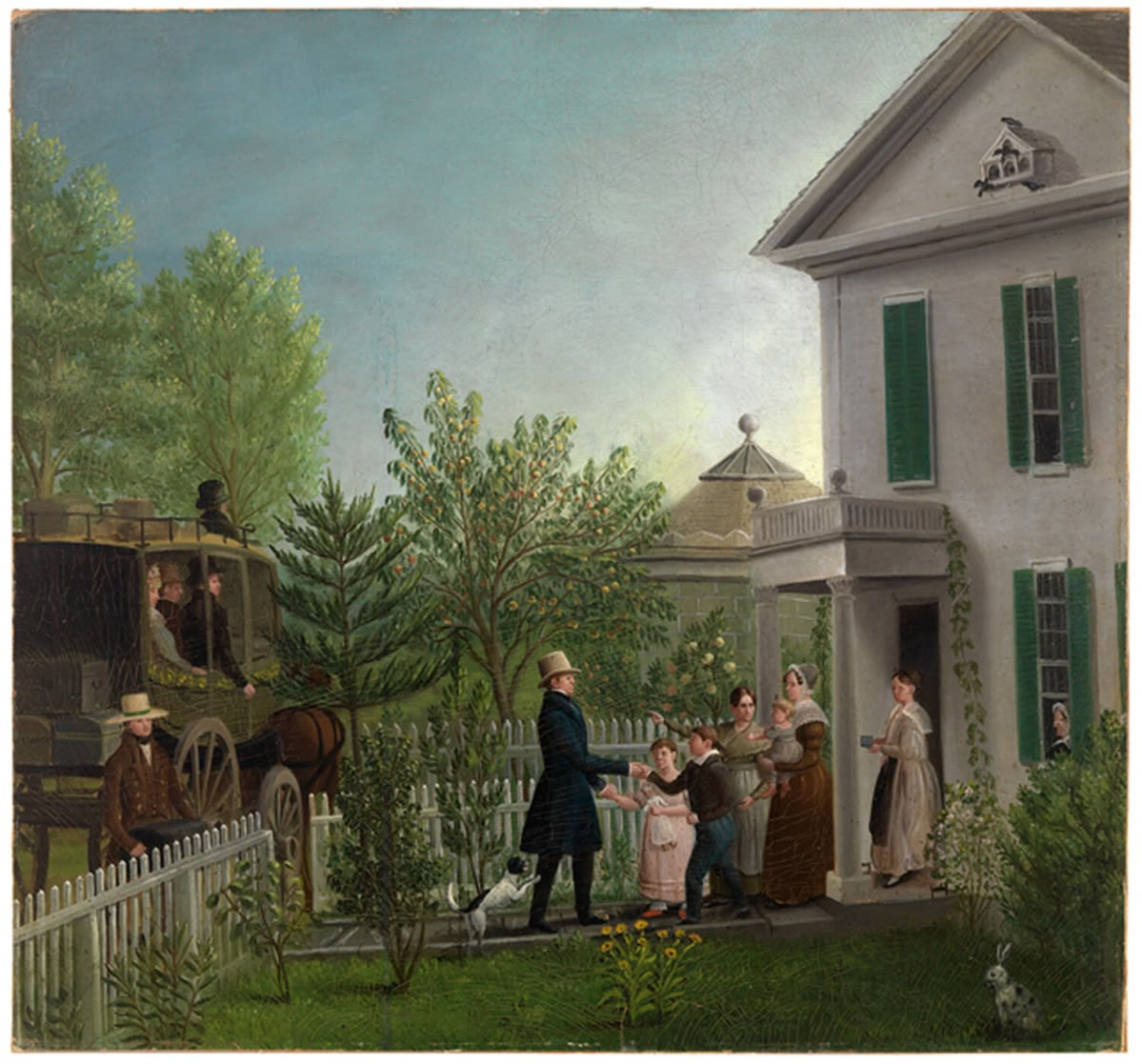

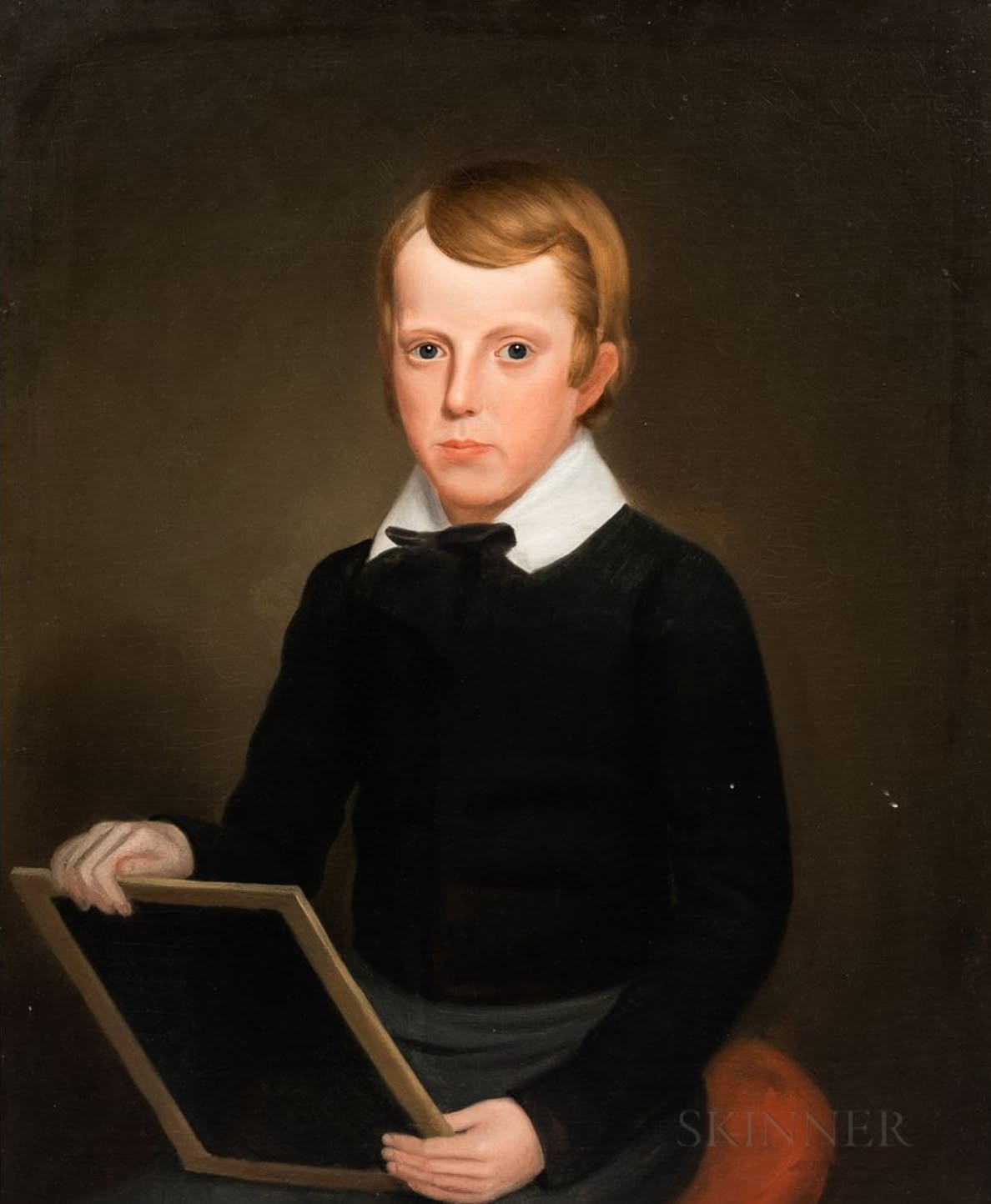

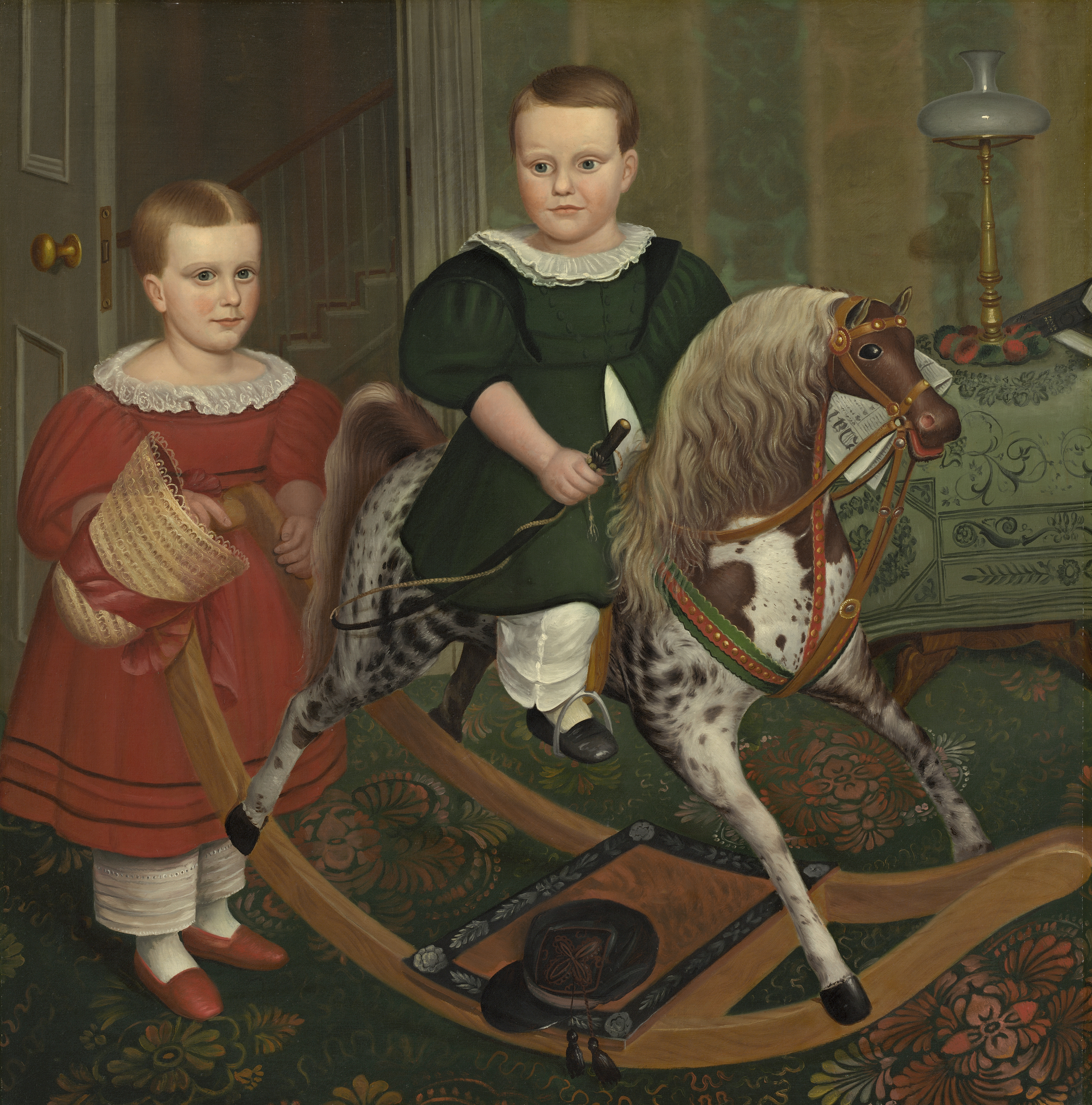

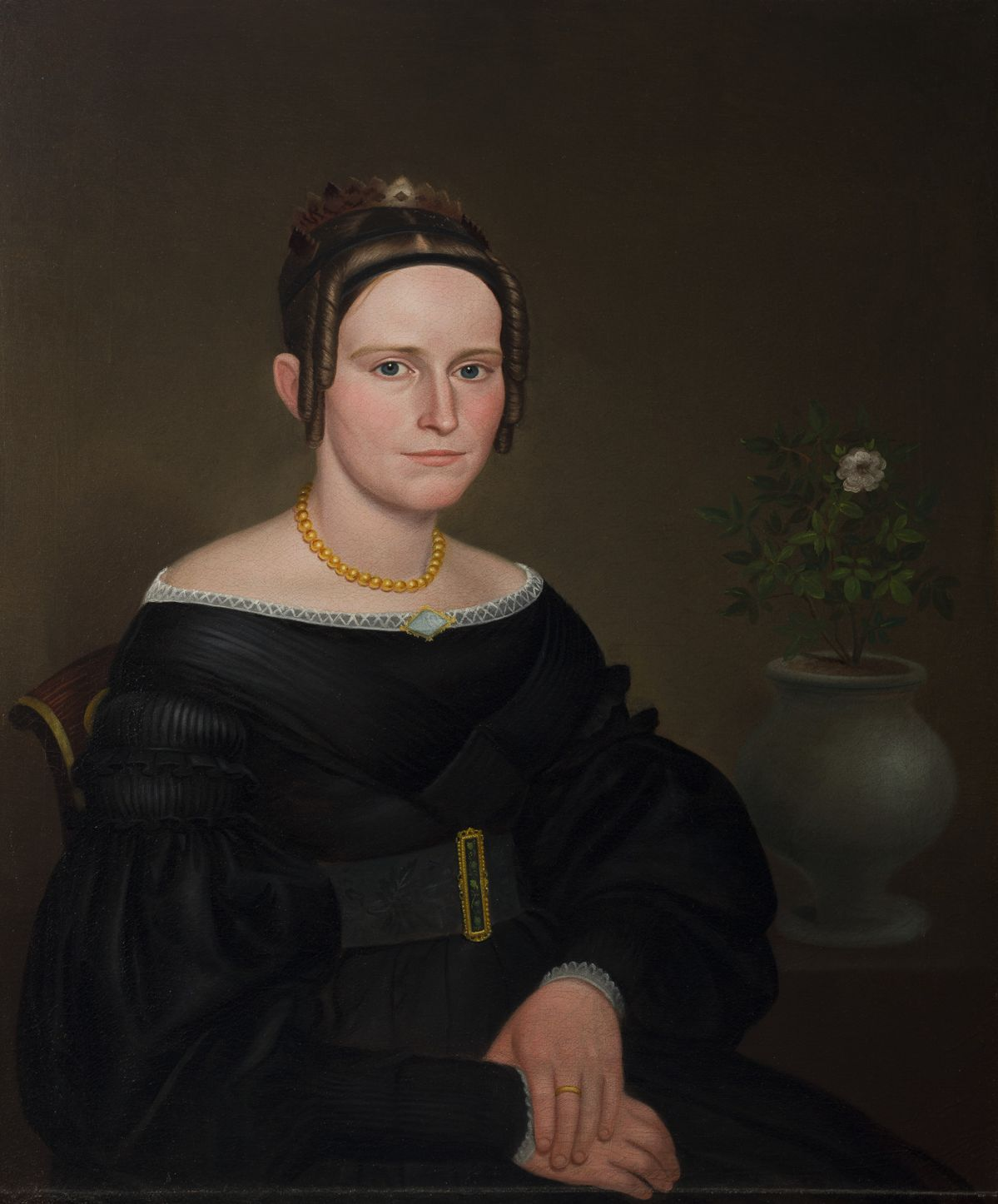

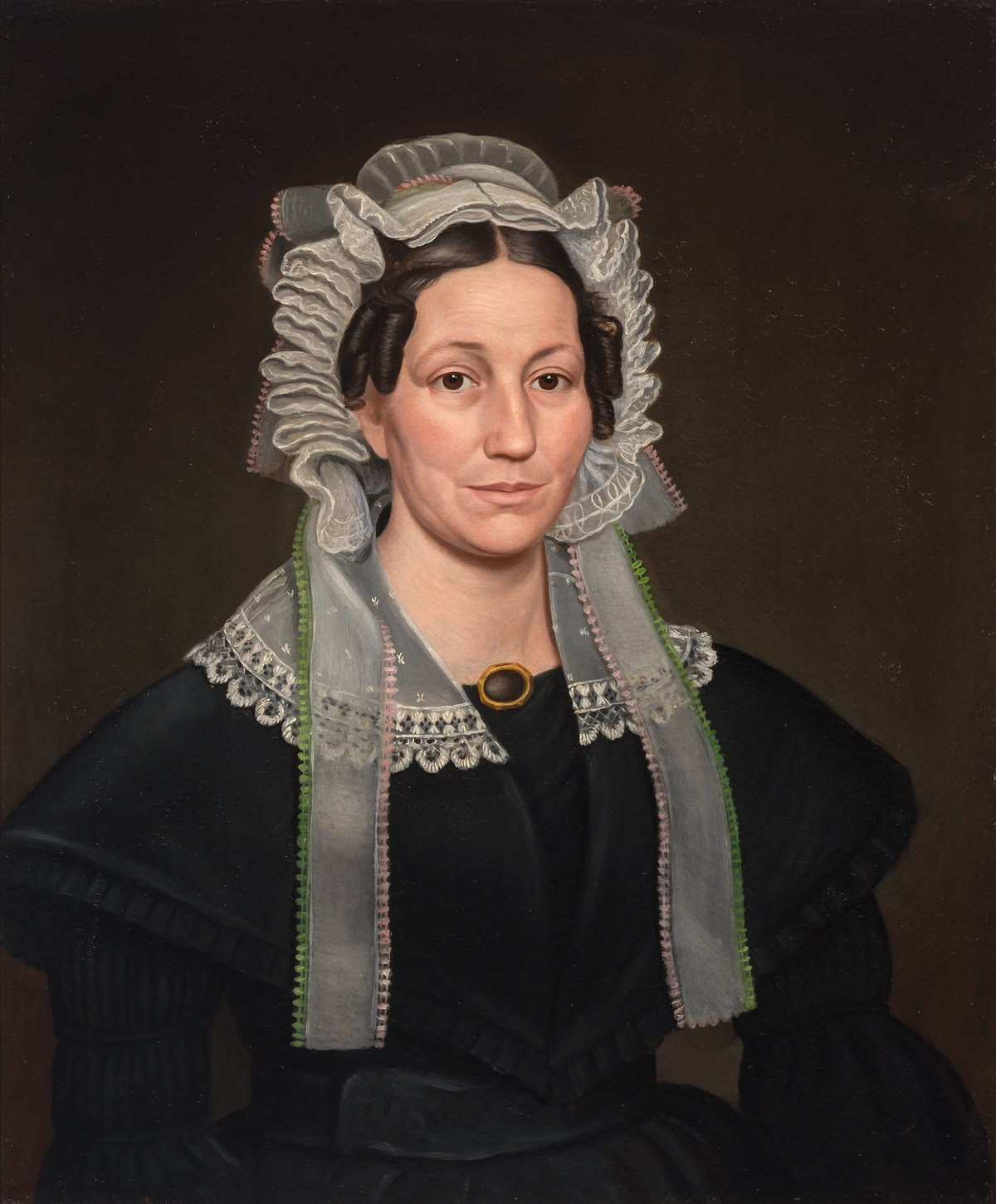

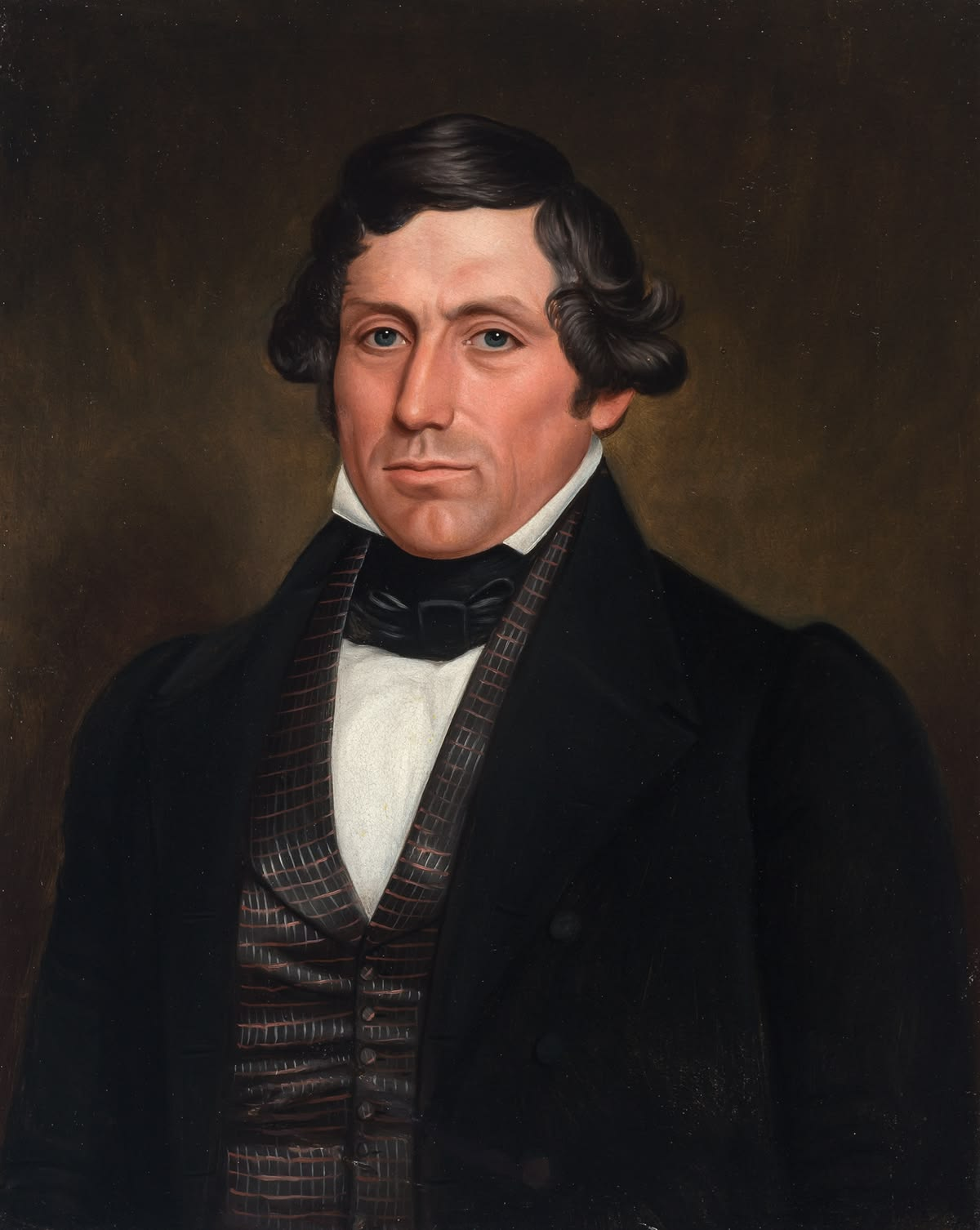

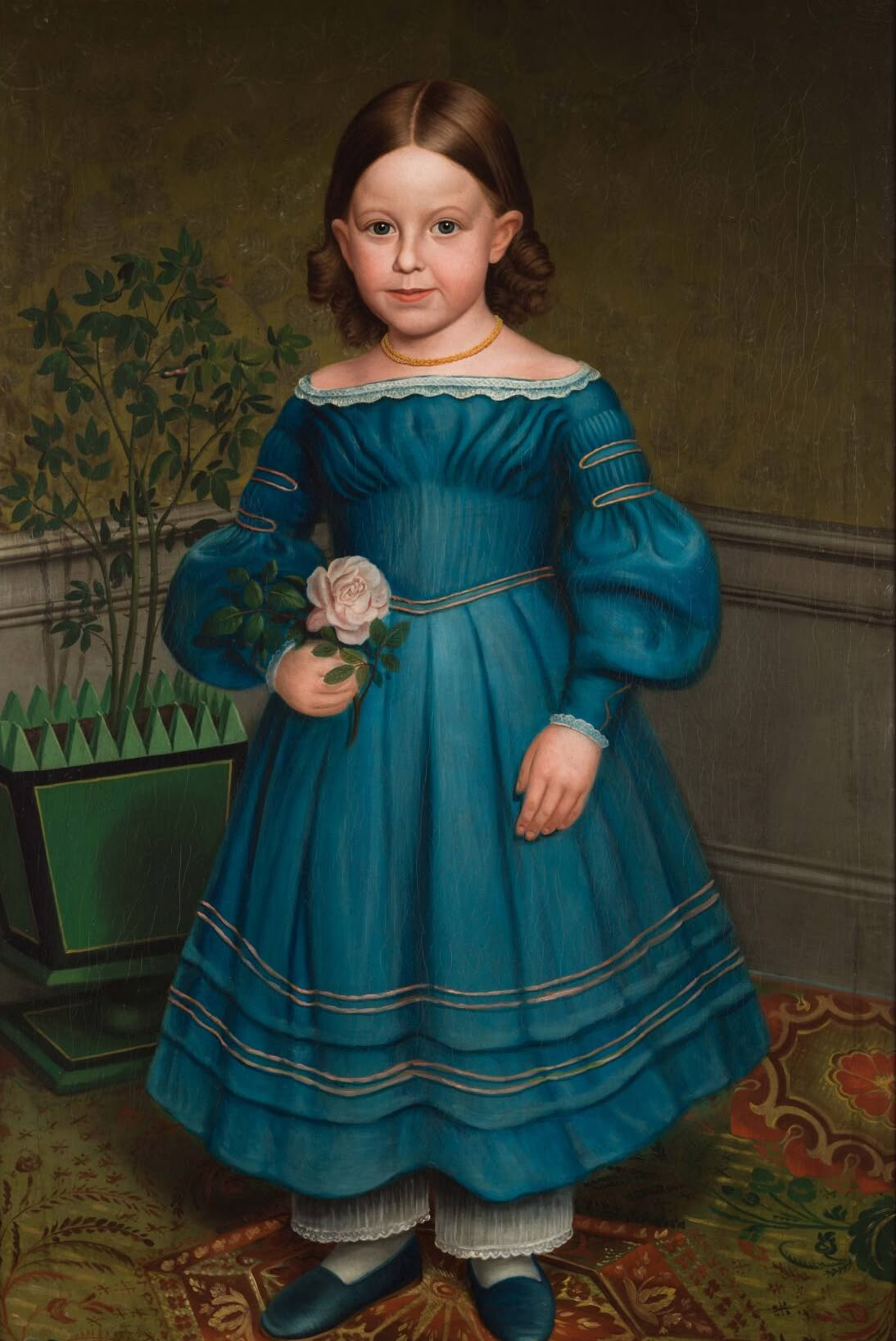

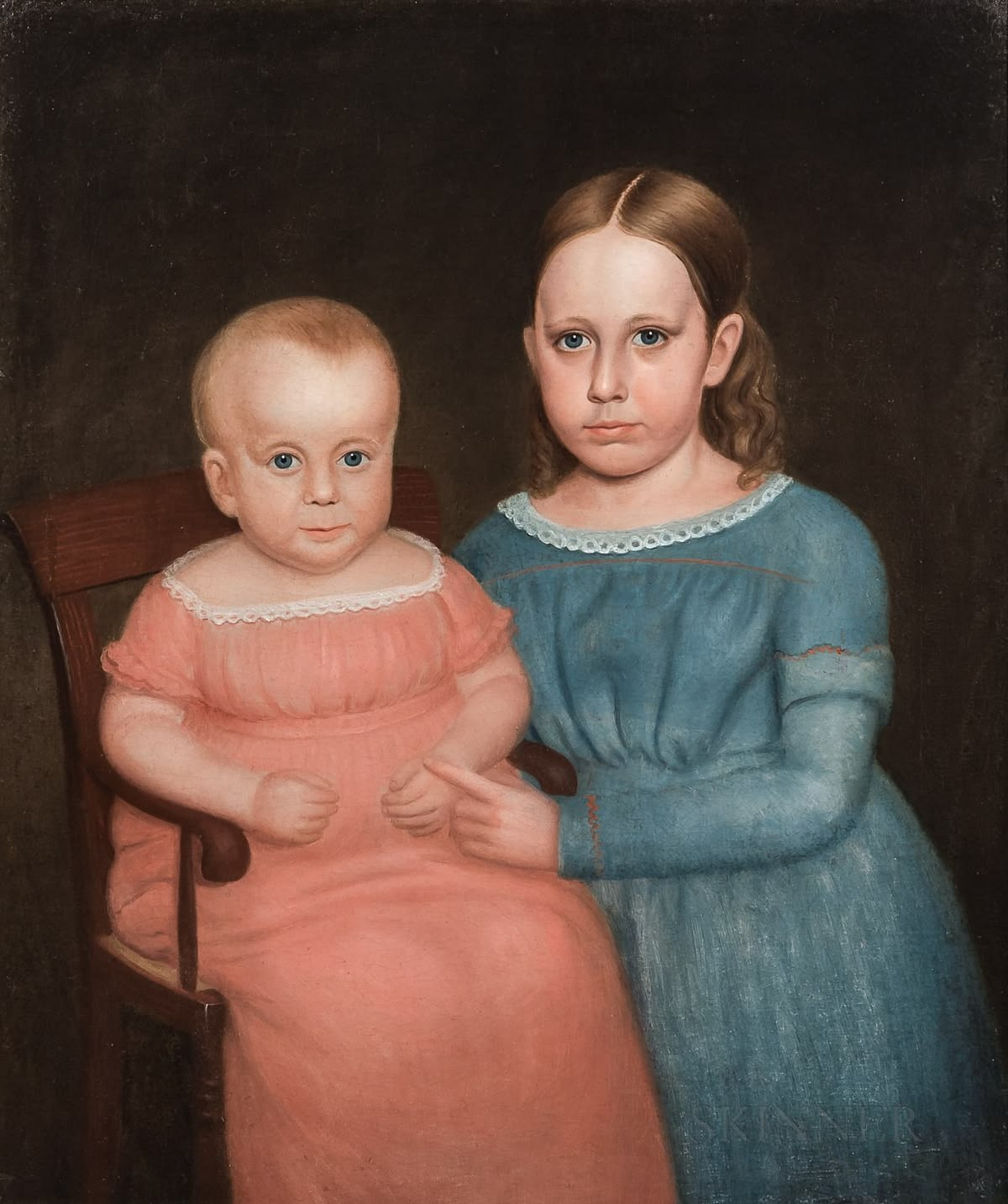

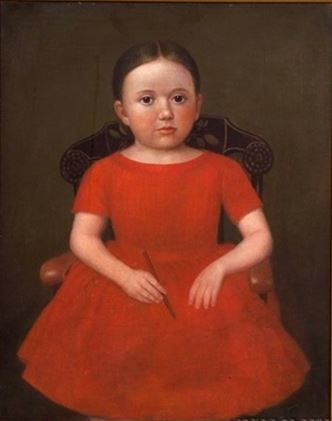

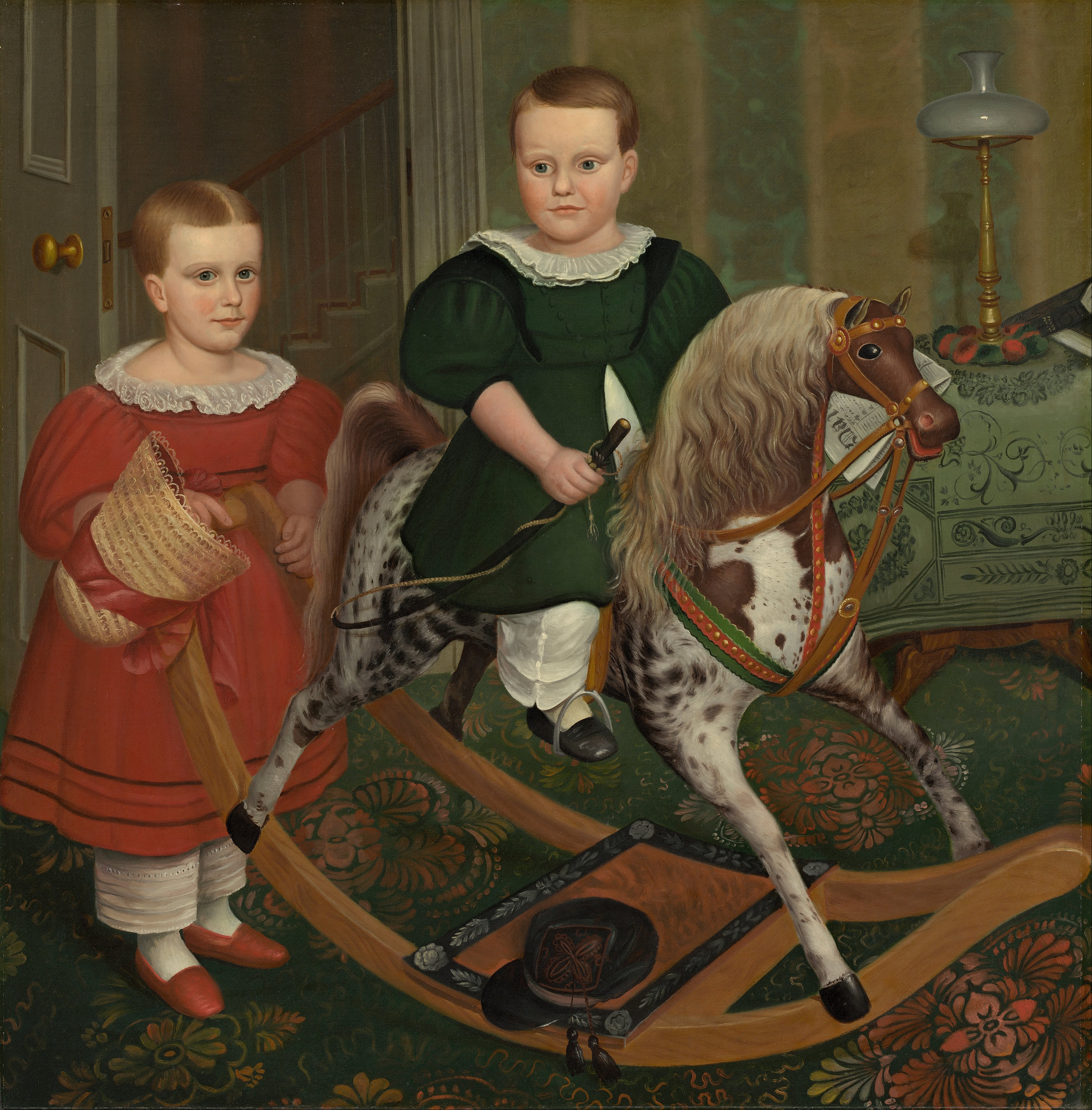

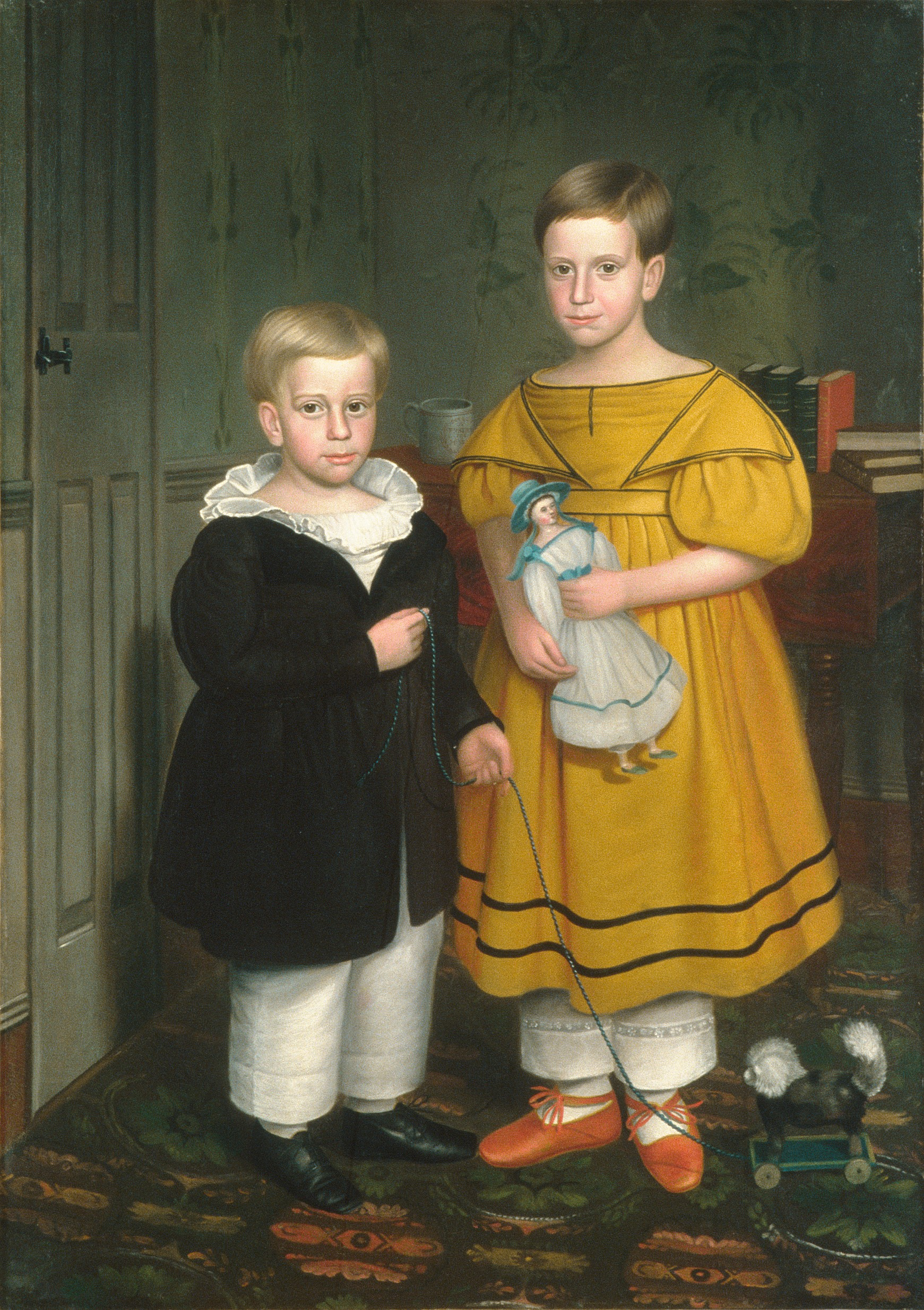

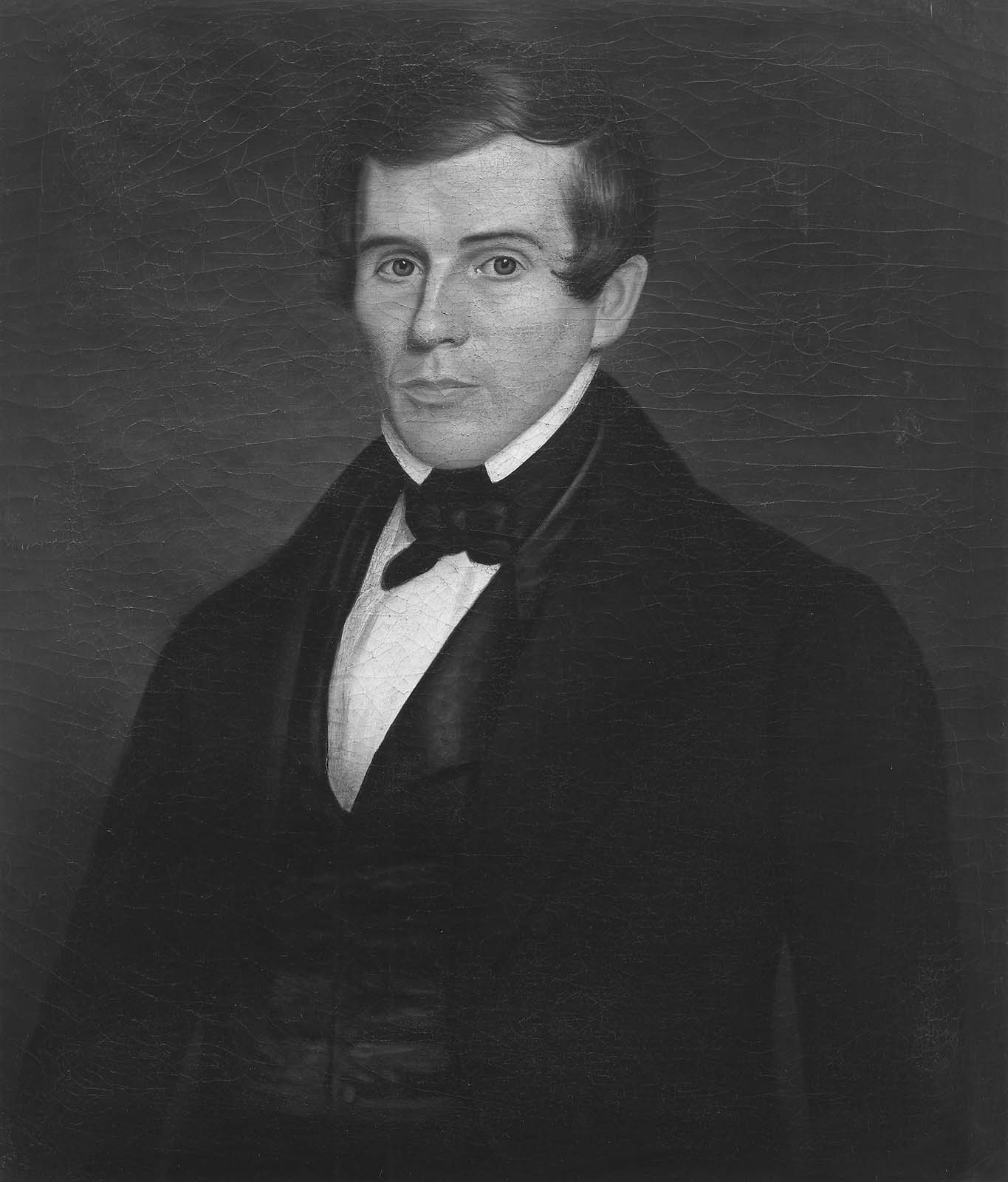
