= Maud Muller =

1856 poem

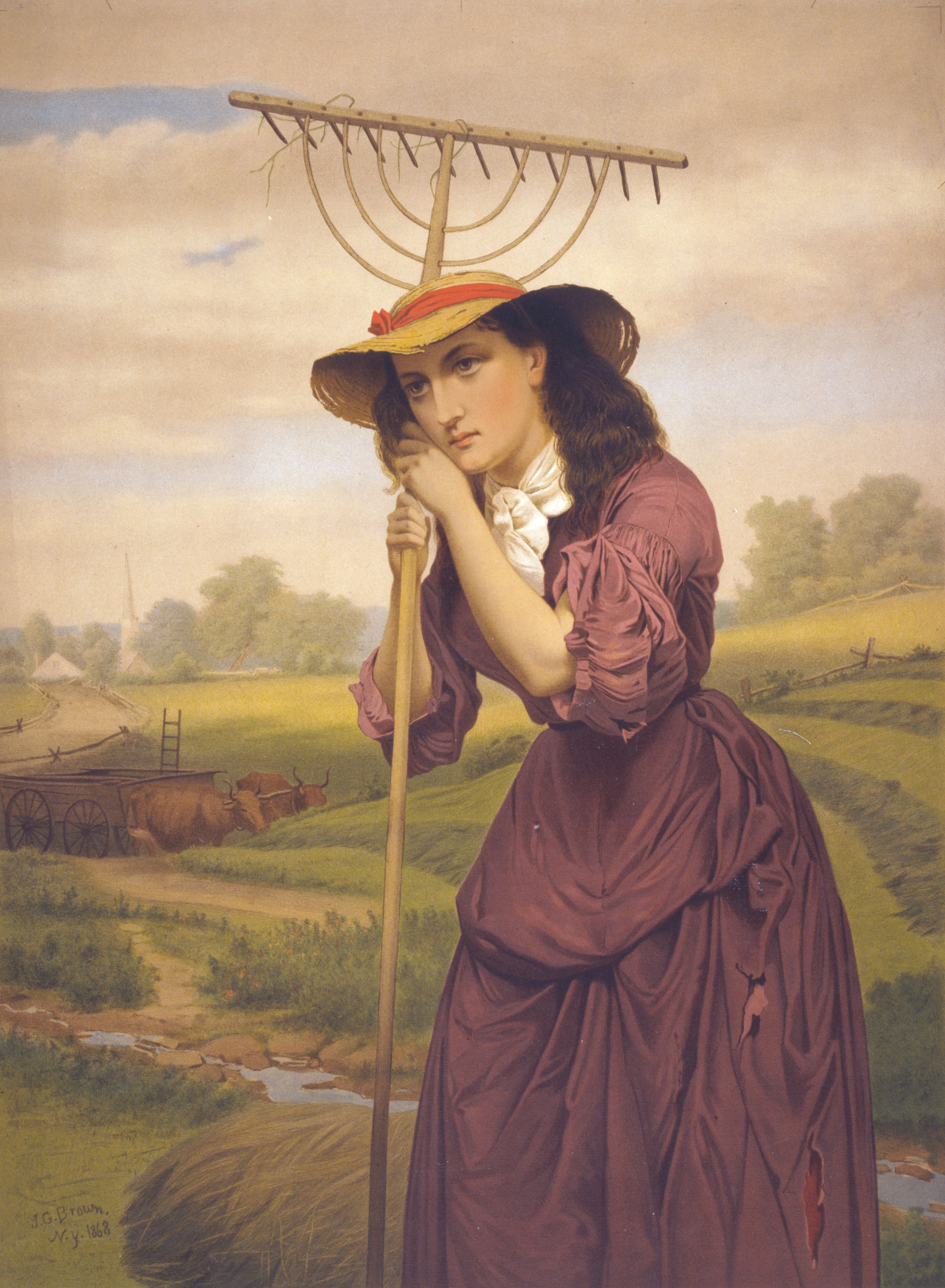
Print shows Maud Muller, John Greenleaf Whittier's heroine in the poem of the same name, leaning on her hay rake, gazing into the distance. Behind her, an ox cart, and in the distance, the village

"Maud Muller" is a poem from 1856 written by John Greenleaf Whittier (1807–1892). It is about a beautiful maid named Maud Muller. One day, while harvesting hay, she meets a judge from the local town. Each is smitten with the other. The judge thinks that he would like to be a local farmer married to Maud, while she thinks that she would like to be the wealthy judge's wife.

Neither voices these thoughts, however, and both the judge and the maiden move on. The judge marries a woman of wealth whose love for him is based on his riches. Maud Muller marries a young uneducated farmer. Throughout the rest of their lives, each remembers the day of their meeting and remorsefully reflects on what might have been.

This poem contains the well-known quotation: "For of all sad words of tongue or pen, The saddest are these: 'It might have been!'"

Whittier's younger contemporary Bret Harte wrote a short parody and sequel to the poem entitled "Mrs. Judge Jenkins", which mocks Whittier's conclusion by having Maud marry the Judge after all, with far more disastrous results: Maud's relatives get drunk in the wedding, while Maud herself grows "broad and red and stout" after giving birth to twins. Both eventually come to regret the marriage: Maud because she finds the Judge's emphasis on knowledge boring, while the Judge bemoans Maud's lack of refinement and social grace.

Harte juxtaposes Whittier's famous line with his own witty take:

If, of all words of tongue and pen,

The saddest are, "It might have been,"

More sad are these we daily see:

"It is, but hadn't ought to be."
