= Spey River =

Spey River may refer to:

- River Spey, Scotland, important for the scotch whisky distilleries along its banks
- Spey River (Ontario)
- Spey River (Southland) in New Zealand
- Spey River (Tasman) in New Zealand
