= Ewen Bain =

Scottish cartoonist (1925–1989)

Ewen Bain (23 June 1925 – 18 December 1989) was a Scottish Highlander cartoonist, whose most notable creation was the Angus Og comic strip, a stereotypical depiction of the quintessential 20th century Highlander, which ran in the Glasgow-based newspaper the Daily Record and its sister title The Sunday Mail. He also regularly contributed political cartoons, often of a pro-Scottish independence nature, to these and other newspapers.

Bain's family came from Skye, Highland. He was born in Maryhill, educated at Woodside School, Glasgow, and at the Glasgow School of Art. Bain was an art teacher, who taught at both Allan Glen's and Kingsridge Senior Secondary Schools. In 1969, he gave up teaching to concentrate full-time on his cartoon work.

In addition to his work for the daily press, Ewen Bain was also very supportive of the monthly, pro-independence Scots Independent newspaper and contributed a long series of editorial cartoons to the publication between 1978 and his death in 1989. He also helped many Scottish National Party candidates with contributions to their election material.

== Bibliography ==
- 21 Years of Angus Og, Ewen Bain, Glasgow: Daily Record and Sunday Mail, 1981, 96 p. : ill.; 14 x 22 cm. -- Title from cover. -- Caption title: The Adventures of Angus Og. -- Retrospective selection of strip cartoon Angus Og, 1960–1981, Call no.: PN6738.A52B3 1981
- Bain's Cartoons, a selection of Bain's political cartoons, edited by David R Rollo, Scots Independent, 1991
- Angus Og From The Og Logs, ISBN 1-901984-04-4, Zipo, Publication Date: 20 November 1999
