= Spey-wife =

Scots term for a fortune-telling woman

A spaewife, spae-wife or spey-wife is a Scots language term for a female fortune-teller. The term spae comes from Old Norse spá, meaning to prophesy. The name was used as the title of several works of fiction: Robert Louis Stevenson's poem "The Spaewife"; John Galt's historical romance The Spaewife: A Tale of the Scottish Chronicles; and Paul Peppergrass's The Spaewife, or, The Queen's Secret.

== Melville's interpretation ==
According to Francis Melville's The Book of Faeries (2002), a spae wife is also a type of elf. No taller than a human finger, fairy spae wives are usually dressed in the clothes of a peasant. However, when properly summoned, the attire changes from common to magnificent: blue cloak with a gem-lined collar and black lambskin hood lined with catskin, calfskin boots, and catskin gloves. Like human spae wives, they can also predict the future, through runes, tea leaves and signs generated by natural phenomena, and are good healers. They are said to be descended from the erectors of the standing stones.
