= John Boyce =

Irish writer

John Boyce (born in Donegal, Ireland, in 1810, died in Worcester, Massachusetts, 2 January 1864) was a novelist, lecturer, and Catholic priest, known under the assumed name of "Paul Peppergrass".

His father was the wealthy proprietor of the principal hotel in the town and a magistrate of the county. John entered the preparatory seminary in Navan, County Meath, and graduated with the highest honours in rhetoric and philosophy. He completed his studies at St Patrick's College, Maynooth and was ordained priest in 1837. For eight years he worked on the Irish mission, but in 1845 moved to America. From Eastport, Maine, the scene of his first missionary work, he was transferred in 1847 to St. John's Catholic Church, Worcester, where he remained until his death.

== Published works ==
- Shandy Maguire, or Tricks upon Travellers (New York, 1848), which was dramatized by "J. Pilgrim";
- The Spaewife, or the Queen's Secret (Baltimore, 1853), a novel featuring the Völva, a figure in Northern European pagan mythology;
- Mary Lee or the Yankee in Ireland (1859), first published serially in the "Metropolitan Magazine" of Baltimore.

Besides these books he contributed to the editorial columns of the Boston Pilot, wrote many sketches and criticisms which appeared in print, and a lecture on "The Satisfying Influence of Catholicity on the Intellect and Senses", delivered before the Catholic Institute in New York in 1851.
