= The Hollow of the Three Hills =

1830 short story by Nathaniel Hawthorne

- Short story by Nathaniel Hawthorne

Text available at Wikisource
- Country: United States
- Language: English
- Genre: Horror short story

Publication
- Published in: Salem Gazette
- Media type: Print, newspaper
- Publication date: November 12, 1830

"The Hollow of the Three Hills" is a story published in 1830 by the American writer Nathaniel Hawthorne. It is considered to be his first published short story.

The story is about a young woman who asks a fortune teller for information about the fate of her family. During their evening meeting in a hollow in the forest, the fortune teller (whether she is a witch remains unclear) conjures up three apparitions that reveal the young woman's sins and their consequences: She has abandoned her family, her parents are embittered, her husband is in an insane asylum, her child is dead. This early story already shows many of Hawthorne's typical stylistic characteristics and subjects - complex symbolism, enigmatic ambiguity, dark atmosphere, questions about the nature of sin, guilt, punishment and despair - which make him an outstanding representative of "dark" American Romanticism alongside Edgar Allan Poe and Herman Melville.

== Plot summary ==
An hour before sunset, a graceful but desperate young woman and an old hag meet at a previously agreed location: a dark, barren hollow surrounded by three wooded hills, in the middle of which there is a putrid pond in which some tree trunks are slowly rotting away. According to the narrator, this is where the Prince of Darkness used to meet with his lost souls to perform his "impious baptismal rite". The young woman hopes to get information from the Vettel about the welfare of her loved ones, whom she has left behind in another country, and promises to do whatever is asked of her ("though I die").

The old woman makes the young woman kneel down, spreads a cloak over her face and murmurs "prayers" that are "not meant to be acceptable in Heaven". Soon other voices can be heard, at first clearly, then again they seem to merge with the sound of the autumn wind. They are the voices of an old man and an old woman who speak sadly about a daughter "a wanderer they knew not where, bearing dishonor along with her, and leaving shame and affliction to bring their gray heads to the grave." After the voices have faded away, the old woman remarks with a grin that the old couple seem to be having a "weary and lonesome time". The young woman is shocked that the old woman has also heard the voices, but asks for more information. Again, the old woman mumbles monotonous words until screams, moans, sighs, rattling chains and the cracking of a whip can be heard. Then a familiar male voice is heard, telling of "a wife who had broken her holiest vows, of a home and heart made desolate." When this apparition has passed, the old woman grins again and asks "Couldst thou have thought there were such merry times in a Mad House?" The young woman asks to hear just one more voice that is dear to her. The old woman performs her ritual for a third time, and the young woman hears the sounds of a funeral service, and "revilings and anathemas" against "the mother who had sinned against natural affection, and left her child to die".

When the noises have faded, the hag nudges the kneeling young woman, but she doesn't move. Giggling, she says to herself, "Here has been a sweet hour's sport!"

== Context of the work ==
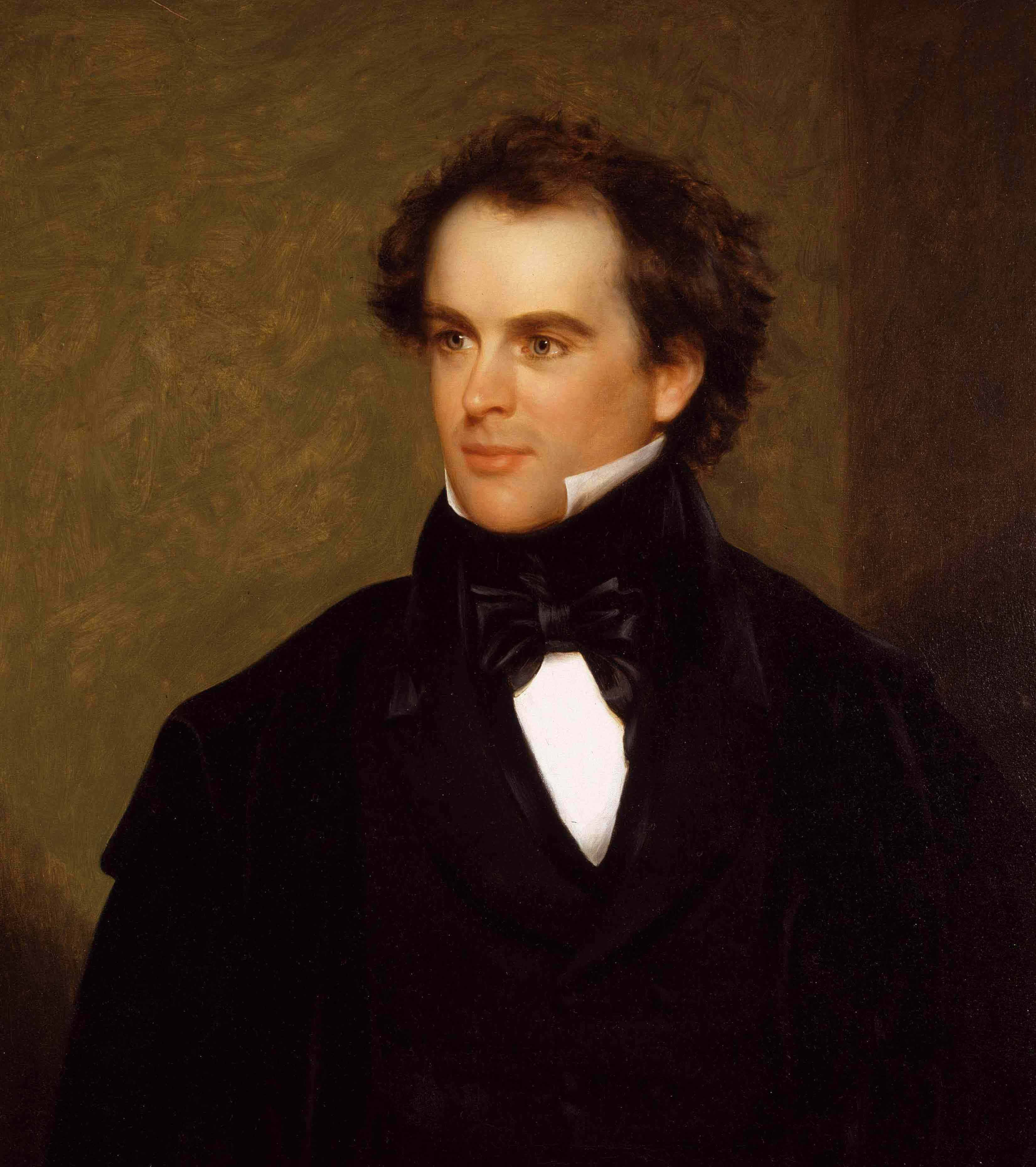
A painting of Nathaniel Hawthorne from 1840

"The Hollow of the Three Hills" is often referred to as Hawthorne's first short story. It first appeared anonymously in the Salem Gazette on November 12, 1830. Ten days earlier, on November 2 of the same year, the same newspaper had already published "The Battle-Omen", also anonymously, whose authorship is also attributed to Hawthorne by many literary scholars. After graduating from college, he lived with his family in relative poverty, seems to have avoided social contact and was disappointed in his writing ambitions. After the failure of his first novel Fanshawe (1828), he turned to the short story and remained faithful to this genre until 1850, when he finally mastered the novel form with The Scarlet Letter.

Around 1830, Hawthorne planned two collections of short prose texts, but was unable to find a publisher and eventually destroyed his manuscripts. It is likely, though not certain, that The Hollow of the Three Hills was intended at least for the first collection (Seven Tales of My Native Land), and perhaps also for the second (Provincial Tales). The original context of the work is thus lost, which may well have led to misconceptions in the reception of the story; G. R. Thompson, for example, assumes that the stories in Provincial Tales were in a dialogical structure.

In 1837, Hawthorne included the story in his first published short story collection, the Twice-Told Tales. "The Hollow of the Three Hills" appeared here as the 15th of the 19 tales in the first of the two volumes. Poe praised the story as particularly successful in his review for Graham's Magazine (1842). He highlighted the economy and effectiveness of the narrative ("Every word tells, and there is not a word which does not tell"); apparently, they corresponded perfectly to his theory of the short story, which he formulated in a very similar way a few years later in his essay The Philosophy of Composition. The literary scholar Dan McCall believes to have identified direct borrowings from or allusions to "The Hollow of the Three Hills" in Emily Dickinson's poem "I Felt a Funeral, in My Brain".

== Interpretations ==
=== Narrative style ===
"The Hollow of the Three Hills" is a story in which little happens; it is static, almost more of a draft than a story - for Marius Bewley, for example, it is a single "poetically evoked symbol." Hans-Joachim Lang places it alongside the three early works "The Battle-Omen", "The Wives of the Dead" and "An Old Woman's Tale" in a series of Hawthorne's "experiments with radical brevity," all of which are characterized by a rather abrupt ending, some of which even appear incomplete. Their radicality also lies in "the author's resignation to explanation." If Hawthorne's characteristic brooding about responsibility and guilt, sin and atonement, forgiveness and damnation is undoubtedly present, and the story thus possesses qualities beyond the merely entertaining horror of ordinary horror literature, the narrator's peculiarly objective, almost impassive description of the events makes it difficult to make simple statements about their meaning. For Lang, as for Terence Martin, the fact that its "moral" is not expressed is what makes the story unique: the fragmentary "visions" of family chaos, social exclusion and personal isolation in the midst of a "moral wilderness" are so impressive precisely because they remain uncommented.

The narrative discipline makes the ambiguity for which Hawthorne is famous possible. Much remains mysterious in the course of the story. For example, it remains unclear whether the young woman is merely frozen or dead at the end of the story. Nor is it at all clear that occult powers are actually at work in the hollow, even as the introductory sentence emphasizes that at the time of the plot, the "fantastic dreams and madmen's reveries were realized among the actual circumstances of life". A "realistic," psychological reading is thus not excluded, according to which the supposed witch only guesses and projects the supplicant's inner fears and anxieties. Of the inmates of the asylum in the second apparition, the narrator says that their "own burning thoughts had long since become their exclusive world" - another typically Hawthornian thought: the danger of solipsism, the self as a prison, as a "tomb of the heart."

Poe already pointed out a narrative peculiarity in his review: Hawthorne's decision to convey the "visions" by means of the ear rather than the eye, which gives the story a peculiarly dreamlike, abstract character. In this respect, the narrative has a counterpart in "An Old Woman's Tale", in which a procession of ghosts proceeds entirely silently and is conveyed solely by the visible.

=== Genre ===
The time and place of the plot remain extremely vague: it takes place in an unspecified location "in those strange old times, when fantastic dreams and madmen's reveries were realized among the actual circumstances of life Terence Martin sees this as a variation on the formula "Once upon a time ...": time is the place, a "neutral" setting in which the distinction between the real and the fantastical is abolished, as in a fairy tale. The opening sentence of this early short story thus already points to the Romantic understanding of art that Hawthorne formulated in his preface to the novel The House of the Seven Gables (1851): the author asks for artistic freedom beyond the strict imperatives of truthfulness or plausibility in order to fathom the deeper "truth of the heart".

Unlike many of his best-known short stories ("Young Goodman Brown", "The Minister's Black Veil") or his most famous novel The Scarlet Letter, "The Hollow of the Three Hills" is not explicitly set in the Puritan colonial era in Massachusetts. Although Michael J. Colacurcio points out the possibility that the setting of the story alludes to the topography of the city of Boston, which was built on three hills, he considers this too unspecific; Hawthorne had not yet found his purpose as a chronicler of the "moral history" of New England in this early story. Carl H. Sederholm disagrees with this interpretation and believes that the narrator's references to "those strange times" and the "gray tradition" make it clear that Hawthorne was precisely interested in an examination of the past. He shows that the transmission and communication of the past, especially through the academic historiography of the 19th century with its rational view of the world, is inadequate - in order to understand history (especially that of New England), one must understand that "superstition", which is ridiculed today, once had a firm place as a category of understanding. History therefore had an irrational, "visionary" quality that had no place in positivist historiography, but could be portrayed in literature.

There is a close relationship with the explicitly historical narratives through the prominent motif of witchcraft, which Hawthorne repeatedly imposed on himself, partly because of his family's involvement in the Salem witch trials. Ely Stock also believes that the story contains a specific biblical background- the story of the witch of Endor (1 Sam 28:3-25 ), but Kenneth W. Staggs rejects this as unconvincing. In any case, the motif is borrowed from the inventory of horror literature, which Hawthorne makes ample use of in his work. Occultism and magic are not Hawthorne's actual concern, and so the narrator also refuses to pass judgment on whether the devil is actually up to mischief in the hollow, but merely refers succinctly to the fact that "gray tradition" wants it that way; the word "witch" is also conspicuously absent; the fortune teller is just an "aged crone".

The motif of the "fallen woman" points to another genre, the "sentimental" literature, whose authors (the market was dominated by women) Hawthorne later denigrated in a much-quoted curse about the "damned mob of scribbling women". It is the combination of these two genres that provides Hawthorne with opportunities to undermine sentimental clichés. For example, Staggs points out that the fairly conventional sin of adultery is usually atoned for in sentimental literature by the protagonist "going into water", whereas Hawthorne's sinner is unmistakably doomed when she kneels in the foul water of the pond in the hollow. Her sin is more serious than a mere breach of social convention (marriage or gender roles in general), but is tantamount to a sin against nature and the cosmic order.

=== Symbolism ===
Many interpretations of the story focus on the strongly symbolically charged setting of the story. In their structuralist analyses, both Staggs and Clinton S. Burhans interpret it as a mythical symbol of a (disturbed) cosmic order. Burhans sees the symbolism of the story as being layered into a fully developed allegory and directs attention to the carefully worked out contrast between the beautiful and the ugly, youth and age, growth and decay. It first becomes clear in the young woman's encounter with the "withered" and "decrepit" old woman and is soon reversed, as the young woman is also "affected by premature decay in the prime of life." The decay of these two mortals is then linked to that of their natural surroundings; the young sinner dips the border of her garment "into the pool" to receive the visions and thus becomes one with the hollow where nothing grows but "brown grass of October" and where only dead tree trunks rot. Burhans also recognizes a sexual symbolism here: the hollow as a symbol of the womb, just as sterile and fruitless as the unfaithful relationship that drove the young woman to her doom. According to Burhans, another symbolic level is of a theological nature and points to salvation and damnation: the sinkhole appears as Hades or hell; the immersion of the robe in the putrid water is reminiscent of the "impious baptismal rite" that the devil is said to have once performed in this very place. The story ends with the sunset, which plunges the hollow into complete darkness. The hollow stands in contrast to the surrounding hills, which are densely wooded and bathed in a bright light by the setting sun. Burhans interprets them as a symbol of the Trinity, and their geometric regularity (the hollow they enclose is "almost mathematically circular") also points to the perfection of the natural order. In this allegorical reading, the fact that the young woman is doomed becomes certain early on in the story, namely at the moment when she looks up "to the edge of the hollow, as if considering whether she should not better return home without having achieved anything. But fate would have it otherwise".

Staggs sees the number three as a leitmotif, if not a structural principle of the story: the three visions successively illustrated the young woman's individual, social and "cosmic" responsibility and reflected a theologically connoted sequence of purity-sin-atonement. As a classical (or Christian) symbol of perfection, it contributes to the mythical character of the narrative, which Staggs emphasizes. However, Hawthorne turns the familiar topoi into their opposite: the hollow corresponds to a "sacred center", like the navel of the world at Delphi – a place of hierophany, an interface between the worlds of the sacred and the profane and therefore also the seat of a famous oracle. But this actually "holy" place is desecrated in Hawthorne's story: the devil is the godfather of the baptism rites that take place here, and the prayers that are said here are "not meant to be acceptable in Heaven". Instead of growth and wisdom, this place produces only decay and death.

=== Sin and guilt ===
Other commentators are more cautious with such far-reaching "cosmological" interpretations, but likewise see a gravity to the young woman's guilt that goes beyond mere adultery. Michael J. Colacurcio points out that the burden of guilt becomes heavier and heavier as the story progresses: He believes he has identified the pivotal point of the story at the moment when the young woman is surprised to discover that the old hag not only conjures up the "visions", but also partakes of them herself ("'So you heard them too!' she cried, and a feeling of unbearable humiliation triumphed over despair and fear"); the inner torment of her soul is made all the more painful by her shame towards others. The young woman only commits her most serious sin in the course of the story when she decides to transgress the barriers of "natural" knowledge and gain knowledge to which she is not entitled. Her willingness to do anything to achieve this, including surrendering to diabolical powers, reveals a variation on the Faust material in the story.

David Downing sees the story as dramatizing not so much the individual guilt and damnation of the young woman, but rather that of a society. Like a lens, the hollow at its center focuses the suffering not only of the young woman, but of her embittered parents, her insane husband, the nameless voices of the funeral procession, and thus of her entire culture, if not of humanity; their voices not only merge, but also become one with those of the autumn wind; they are all equally marked by decay. Hawthorne may have had the Puritan view of humanity in mind here, with its belief in innate depravity, the necessarily corrupted nature of man through original sin, but ultimately it becomes clear that this is a man-made hell full of perfidy, madness, curse and brutality. Hawthorne is describing a culture that he intuitively senses brings great suffering to mankind.

Hans-Joachim Lang criticizes such speculative interpretations as ahistorical; they do not take into account the traditional Christian notions of evil in general and the devil in particular, which Hawthorne's story also presupposes. Accordingly, the devil is not only implicitly but actually present at the young woman's rendezvous with the witch; the narrator assures us that the two of them in the hollow "no mortal could observe them"; but the devil is not mortal. For Lang, the biblical knowledge that the devil is the "father of lies" (John 8:44 ) is indispensable for understanding the story - there is no reason to assume that the three visions tell the truth about the fate of the young woman's family, the opposite is the case. The young woman had lost hope and faith and had therefore "gone to the devil" - not (only) in the sense of a ghost story, but in the actual, theological sense.

Alison Easton points out that the story offers not only no narrative, but also no ethical dénouement. The reader can hardly conclude with the conviction that the young woman has received her just punishment, for to do so would be to join the witch, who has the last word in the story. Like the reader, the woman is trapped in the same conventional value system that cannot excuse her transgressions; the moral conflict remains unresolved for her as for the reader.

=== Reviews ===
Opinions on the quality of the story vary considerably. In contemporary criticism, Poe saw the story as an outstanding example of Hawthorne's special abilities ("an excellent example of the author's peculiar ability"). Furthermore, in his assessment of the story he formulated: "Every word tells, and there is not a word which does not tell". This statement represents the highest honor Poe could bestow as a literary critic.

Similarly, Burhans takes the story as proof that Hawthorne achieved mastery in his very first tale; similarly Staggs, who sees here a triumph in the density of atmosphere unrivaled even by far better-known stories such as "Young Goodman Brown" and "My Kinsman, Major Molineux". Colacurcio considers it unsuccessful due to its all too unspecific subject matter, hardly more than an aesthetic finger exercise, and Neal Frank Doubleday also sees the story as a journeyman's piece at best and does not even acknowledge it with a review in his monograph on Hawthorne's early stories. For Lea Newman, too, the story is too abstractly conceived and too diffusely executed to be "effective" as literature. More recently, however, it has often been said to be ahead of its time precisely because of its peculiarly experimental structure and to correspond to modern or postmodern concepts of the short story.

Regardless of quality judgments, however, there is a consensus that this early story (unlike the first novel) anticipates Hawthorne's later work both stylistically and thematically; in the canon of his stories, however, "The Hollow of the Three Hills" occupies a rather marginal position.

== Bibliography ==
=== Editions ===
The first edition of the Twice-Told Tales can be found digitized in the Internet Archive:

- Hawthorne, Nathaniel (1837). Twice-Told Tales. Boston: American Stationers’ Co.

The modern standard edition of Hawthorne's works is The Centenary Edition of the Works of Nathaniel Hawthorne (ed. by William Charvat, Roy Harvey Pearce et al., Ohio State University Press, Columbus OH 1962–1997; 23 volumes). The Hollow of the Three Hills can be found in volume IX (Twice-Told Tales, 1974). Many of the numerous anthologies of Hawthorne's short stories contain The Hollow of the Three Hills, a common reading edition is

- Hawthorne, Nathaniel (1982) Tales and Sketches. edited by Roy Harvey Pearce. New York: Library of America.

The first edition of the Twice-Told Tales can be found digitized in the Internet Archive:

- Hawthorne, Nathaniel (1837) Twice-Told Tales. Boston: American Stationers’ Co.

=== Secondary literature ===
- Burhans Jr., Clinton S. (1961). Hawthorne's Mind and Art in "The Hollow of the Three Hills". In: The Journal of English and Germanic Philology 60:2 pp. 286–295.
- Colacurcio, Michael J. (1984). The Province of Piety: Moral History in Hawthorne's Early Tales. Duke University Press, Durham NC . ISBN 0-8223-1572-6
- Downing, David (1980). Beyond Convention: The Dynamics of Imagery and Response in Hawthorne's Early Sense of Evil. In: American Literature 51:1. pp. 463–476.
- Johnston, Paul K. (1997). Nathaniel Hawthorne's Triple Thinking in The Hollow of Three Hills. In: The Nathaniel Hawthorne Review 23:2. pp. 1–16.
- Lang, Hans-Joachim (1985) Poeten und Pointen. Zur amerikanischen Erzählung des 19. Jahrhunderts. Palm & Enke, Erlangen (=Erlanger Studien 63)
- Newman, Lea Bertani Vozar (1979). A Reader's Guide to the Short Stories of Nathaniel Hawthorne. G. K. Hall & Co., Boston. ISBN 0-8161-8398-8
- Pandeya, Prabhat K. (1975) The Drama of Evil in "The Hollow of the Three Hills". In: The Nathaniel Hawthorne Journal . pp. 177–181.
- Sederholm, Carl H. (2004). Hawthorne's Gray Tradition: Reading History and the Supernatural. In: Prism(s) 12, . pp. 39–54, doi:10.3828/EIR.12.1.2
- Staggs, Kenneth W. (1977). The Structure of Nathaniel Hawthorne's 'Hollow of the Three Hills. In: Linguistics in Literature 2:2, . pp. 1–18.
- Thompson, G. R. (1993). The Art of Authorial Presence: Hawthorne's Provincial Tales. Duke University Press, Durham, N.C. ISBN 0-8223-1321-9
