= Moody House =

Moody House (or variations such as Moody Mansion or Homestead) may refer to:

- Moody House (Bald Knob, Arkansas), listed on the National Register of Historic Places (NRHP)
- Moody Mansion, Galveston, Texas
- Moody Mansion (Pittston, Maine)
- Moody Homestead, York, Maine, NRHP-listed
- Rorick House Museum, also known as Malcolm A. Moody House, in The Dalles, Oregon, NRHP-listed
- Willis-Moody Mansion, Galveston, Texas, NRHP-listed

== See also ==
- Moody Barn, Chisago City, Minnesota
