= Scott Gibbons =

American music performer and composer

Scott Gibbons (born March 2, 1969) is an American-born composer and performer of electroacoustic music. His work is notable for its rigorous use of single and unexpected objects as sole instrumentation (for example Unheard : Sonic arrangements from the microcosmos, which uses only sounds recorded at the molecular level using the prototype of a new type of microphone; and music for the 120th anniversary of the Eiffel Tower which incorporated sounds of the tower itself). Gibbons has also created many works for large-scale spectacle with Groupe F to accompany fireworks, which embraces the sound of pyrotechnics as a part of the musical arrangement.

== Critical response ==
"Gibbons' tendency to understatement is extraordinary. What he shows us seems to be... not the event itself, but the trail." - The Wire

"It's not really possible to say how it sounds, only that it does. Knowing what it sounds like is a particular kind of knowledge that only seems to be useful, or even exist, at the time of hearing itself." - Nicholas Ridout, Performance Research

"Scott Gibbons' music... feels as if it is happening inside your own head." - The Guardian

== Lilith ==
Lilith is an American dark ambient music group formed by Scott Gibbons in 1986. Early self-released albums contained little or no text to suggest authorship or titles, and were rooted in homemade audio devices and modified consumer electronics. By the early 1990s, Lilith's music had developed in a sombre minimalist direction, with growing research into extended compositions focused around very low frequencies. On signing with the Sub Rosa label, the name Lilith was taken after Earth's fictitious invisible moon to reflect that the music often suggested more than it revealed.

Most of their works use single sound sources for instrumentation; for example rocks on "Stone" (Sub Rosa: 1992). Unlike other artists working in similar directions, Lilith would perform in concert, and released two albums which were recorded live.

Members were:

- Scott Gibbons (sound)
- Rachel Wilson (sound)
- Brien Rullman (video)

== Selected works ==
- Genesi: from the museum of sleep by Socìetas Raffaello Sanzio (1999) - music and sound for director Romeo Castellucci's landmark piece for theatre.
- Il Combattimento by Socìetas Raffaello Sanzio (2000) - with the Roberto Gini Ensemble.
- Scribble by Golan Levin, Scott Gibbons and Gregory Shakar (2000) - a performance on Levin's AVES gestural audio-video synthesis software.
- Subterranean Sky (2001) with sculptor George DeMerle.
- Dialtones by Golan Levin, Scott Gibbons and Gregory Shakar (2002) - a performance for more than 200 cell phones.
- Tragedia Endogonidia by Socìetas Raffaello Sanzio (2002–04) - music and sound for a series of eleven episodes, eleven video documents, an atlas room and numerous outgrowths.
- Feu d'Artifice by Scott Gibbons and Groupe F (2003) - music arranged and performed using only captured sound and samples of pyrotechnics.
- The Cryonic Chants by Scott Gibbons and Chiara Guidi (2005) - a vocal concert on a text which was formulaically created by a goat.
- Flame Tornado (2005) with Kevin Binkert - music arranged and performed using only captured sound and samples of Binkert's flame vortex device.
- Hey Girl directed by Romeo Castellucci (2006).
- Music for the inauguration of the Berardo Collection Museum with multimedia and pyrotechnics by Groupe F (2007)
- La Face Cachée du Soleil by Groupe F (2007) - theatre of fire, light and pyrotechnics with music by Laurent Dehors, Scott Gibbons and Eric Travers.
- Grandes Eaux by Groupe F (2007) - theatre of fire, light and pyrotechnics.
- Night Must Fall with Chiara Guidi (2008)
- Madrigale Appena Narrabile with Chiara Guidi (2008)
- Music for the launch of Microsoft Vista with multimedia and pyrotechnics by Groupe F (2008)
- La Flamme de mes Rêves (Lux Populi ep. 1) by Groupe F (2008) - theatre of fire, light and pyrotechnics.
- Music for the Opening Ceremony of the World Expo 2008 in Zaragoza with Groupe F (2008)
- des Paysages by Groupe F (2007) - theatre of fire, light and pyrotechnics.
- Inferno, Purgatorio, Paradiso directed by Romeo Castellucci (2008) - trilogy freely inspired by the Divine Comedy of Dante Alighieri, with original music by Scott Gibbons with the Hilliard Ensemble
- Music for the 120th anniversary of the Eiffel Tower with multimedia and pyrotechnics by Groupe F (2009)
- J. Sul concetto di volto nel Figlio di Dio directed by Romeo Castellucci (2010).
- Teatro Anatomico Infantile with Chiara Guidi (2009)
- l'ultima volta che vidi mio padre with Chiara Guidi (2009)
- Les Noces Royales de Louis XIV by Groupe F (2010) - theatre of fire, light and pyrotechnics.
- L'Autre Monde by Groupe F (2010) - theatre of fire, light and pyrotechnics.
- Coups de Foudre by Groupe F (2010) - theatre of fire, light and pyrotechnics.
- Music for the inauguration of the Centre Pompidou-Metz with multimedia and pyrotechnics by Groupe F (2010)
- Music for the inauguration of the Mediterrania Saïdia with multimedia and pyrotechnics by Groupe F (2010)
- Encounter with Firaz Ghazzaz (2011)
- Augustinian Melody with Chiara Guidi (2011)
- Folk. directed by Romeo Castellucci (2012).
- The Four Seasons Restaurant directed by Romeo Castellucci (2013).
- Ulysse au Pays des Merveilles by Groupe F (2013) - theatre of fire, light and pyrotechnics.
- The Breath of the Volcano by Groupe F (2013) - with Richard Nunns & Paddy Free
- Go Down, Moses directed by Romeo Castellucci (2014).
- Unheard : Sonic arrangements from the microcosmos with Romeo Castellucci (2014)
- A Fleur de Peaux by Groupe F (2014) - theatre of fire, light and pyrotechnics.
- Le Magicien d'Eau by Groupe F (2014) - theatre of fire, light and pyrotechnics.
- Le Sacre du Printemps by Romeo Castellucci (2014) - with Teodor Currentzis
- The Four Seasons Restaurant directed by Romeo Castellucci (2014).
- Oedipus the Tyrant directed by Romeo Castellucci (2015).
- Orestea (una commedia organica?) by Socìetas Raffaello Sanzio (2015) - directed by Romeo Castellucci.
- Skin of Fire by Groupe F (2015) - theatre of fire, light and pyrotechnics with music and field recordings by Scott Gibbons.
- Des Mondes Magiques by Groupe F (2015) - theatre of fire, light and pyrotechnics.
- The Minister's Black Veil directed by Romeo Castellucci (2016) - with Willem Dafoe.
- Feux Gaulois by Groupe F (2016) - theatre of fire, light and pyrotechnics.
- Feux Romains by Groupe F (2017) - theatre of fire, light and pyrotechnics.
- Suspended Time by Groupe F (2017) - commissioned for the 50th anniversary of Sgt. Pepper's Lonely Hearts Club Band by the City of Liverpool
- Democracy In America directed by Romeo Castellucci (2017).
- Music for the inauguration of the Louvre Abu Dhabi with multimedia and pyrotechnics by Groupe F (2017).
- Whist by AΦE (2017) - with Jozef van Wissem.
- Vital! by Groupe F (2017) - theatre of fire, light and pyrotechnics with music and field recordings by Scott Gibbons.
- Feux Sacrés by Groupe F (2018) - theatre of fire, light and pyrotechnics.
- La Vita Nuova directed by Romeo Castellucci (2018).
- Tutto/Everything with Romeo Castellucci (2019).
- Pavane für Prometheus directed by Romeo Castellucci (2021).
- BROS directed by Romeo Castellucci (2021).
- Notre Vaisseau by Groupe F at Pont du Gard (2021).
- From the Light Flow installation with Groupe F at Parc de la Villette (2021).
- Shadows Flow installation with Groupe F at The Arles Antique Departmental Museum (2022).
- Domani directed by Romeo Castellucci (2022).
- Milano soundtrack for the film by Yuri Ancarani, directed by Romeo Castellucci (2022).
- Geneva Journey by Groupe F (2023) - performance with over 1,300 drones.
- Persistence des Formes by Groupe F at the Louvre Abu Dhabi (2023).
- Les Marveilles du Vivant by Groupe F at Pont du Gard (2023).
- Music with Opal Gibbons for Barcelona's New Year celebration by Groupe F (2023-24).
- Bérénice directed by Romeo Castellucci (2024) - with Isabelle Huppert.
- Bena Koorliny with Richard Walley by Groupe F (2024).
- Innen video by Arthur Schmidt and GVOON (2024).
- Il mostro di Belinda directed by Chiara Guidi (2024).
- Music for the 2024 Summer Olympics torch relay with Groupe F (2024).
- La Lacrime di Eros with Romeo Castellucci, Raphaël Pichon and Ensemble Pygmalion for the Dutch National Opera (2024)
- I mangiatori di patate with Oliver Gibbons directed by Romeo Castellucci (2025).

== Discography ==
- 1987: Nipple runs. (White Noise)
- 1988: Ripped nuns. (White Noise)
- 1990: The Taboos of the Lashing Creeper by Lilith (Ladd-Frith)
- 1991: Some Modes of Probability by Lilith (White Noise)
- 1991: Mantle by Lilith (White Noise)
- 1992: Stone by Lilith (Sub Rosa)
- 1994: Orgazio by Lilith (Sub Rosa)
- 1995: Redwing by Lilith (Sub Rosa)
- 1998: Orbitronik by Orbitronik (World Domination Records)
- 1999: My Computer My Stereo by Orbitronik (Thousand)
- 1999: Unplugged by Orbitronik (Ladd-Frith)
- 1999: Field Notes by Lilith (World Domination Records)
- 2002: Dialtones by Levin/Gibbons/Shakar (Staalplaat)
- 2002: Imagined Compositions for Water by Lilith (Disques Hushush)
- 2002: Strawberry by Strawberry (Taigkyo)
- 2007: Tragedia Summa by Scott Gibbons (Rarovideo)
- 2008: The Cryonic Chants by Scott Gibbons & Chiara Guidi (KML Recordings/Sonic Invaders)
- 2022: Il Terzo Reich by Romeo Castellucci & Scott Gibbons (Xong collection - artist records, Xing)
