= The Treasure of Far Island =

1902 short story by Willa Cather

- Short story by Willa Cather
- Country: United States
- Language: English
- Genre: Short story

Publication
- Published in: New England Magazine
- Publication type: Literary magazine
- Publication date: October 1902

"The Treasure of Far Island" is a short story by Willa Cather. It was first published in New England Magazine in October 1902.

== Plot summary ==
Douglass Burnham returns home in Empire City, Nebraska, after a fifteen-year hiatus. He is picked up from the train station by his father and his old friend Rhinehold. At home, his mother is cooking dinner. The next day, they go to a party with other locals, and he meets his old friend Margie; they talk about the old days. She admits she heard of one of his plays when she was in New York City once, and even walked past him on the streets but didn't say hello as he seemed busy. He begs her to go back to Far Island, a sandbar where they used to play as children. Despite her dislike of mosquitoes, they venture out and dig out an old 'treasure' they had buried in childhood. They reflect on the fantasy games they used to play, feeling that it is still real.

== Characters ==
- Douglass Burnham, a playwright. He is from Empire City, Nebraska, and has been living in New York City for fifteen years. He has also been to Italy, particularly the Maremma.
- Mr Burnham, Douglass's father.
- Mrs Burnham, Douglass's mother.
- Rhinehold Birker, a childhood friend of Douglass and Margie's. He has always lived in Empire City, aside from his going to Arizona for treatment.
- Mrs Governor
- Margie Van Dyck, a childhood friend of Douglass's.
- Edith Grew, a woman who likes to announcing her engagements to men every so often.
- Temp, a childhood friend of Douglass and Margie's. He now lives in the Philippines.
- Bake, a childhood friend of Douglass and Margie's. He now has a cattle ranch in Wyoming.
- Mac, a childhood friend of Douglass and Margie's. He is now a government clerk in Washington, D.C.
- Jim, a childhood friend of Douglass and Margie's. He is now keeps his father's hardware store.
- Ned and Shorty, childhood friends of Douglass and Margie's. They died on a catboat on the Hudson River.
- Pagie

== Allusions to other works ==
- The story starts with a quotation from a poem by Robert Louis Stevenson, whose novel Treasure Island led to the story's title.
- Greek mythology is mentioned throughout the story, with especial allusions to Anchises and Apollo, Helen of Troy, Arcadia, Ida, Thracia, Orpheus.
- The Bible is mentioned, namely with Eden.
- Children's literature is mentioned with Alice in Wonderland.
- More literature is mentioned with John Keats's May Day Ode, and William Shakespeare's play Romeo and Juliet, with the Montagues and the Capulets, and The Tempest, with Miranda.
- The discovery of the Venus de Milo is alluded to.
- Sinbad the Sailor is also mentioned.

== Allusions to actual history ==
- Mary Tudor is said to have been fond of Calais.

== Literary significance and criticism ==
- It has been suggested that the island in the story was a place on the Republican River where the Cather children liked to play. It is also mentioned in Chapter VII of The Hired Girls, in My Ántonia.
