= Christophe Berthonneau =

French director

Christophe Berthonneau is a French director, scenographer and producer. He is renowned for his original creations and fireworks at international events. He currently holds the position of president and art director at Groupe F.

== Biography ==
Christophe Berthonneau was born in 1963 and grew up among artists of all stripes. At the age of 13, he chooses performance art as his life's purpose and subsequently participates in a multitude of artistic adventures, mainly in public spaces. At 18, fascinated by the dramatic power of fire, he embarks on an all-out research of this material. These artistic and technical achievements are now applied in many fields of the entertainment industry.

In 1992, he joins Groupe F and gathers a multidisciplinary team for the creation of « Oiseaux de Feu », the first multiform show of the company, treating the language of light in all its forms. Since then, he has designed and directed open-air shows around the globe.

His work involves exploring new scenographic, artistic and pyrotechnic territories (needs citation), he produces contemporary theatre and event performances. His creations are open to all audiences.

== Main creations ==
=== Main open-air shows ===
- Les Oiseaux de Feu (on tour from 1994 to 2000)
- Un peu plus de Lumière (on tour from 1997 to 2010)
- Joueurs de Lumière (on tour from 2004 to 2010)
- Coups de Foudre (on tour from 2008 to 2010)
- Versailles : La Face cachée du Soleil (2007 and 2008)
- L’Autre Monde, Les États et Empires du Soleil (2009)
- Les Noces Royales de Louis XIV (2010)
- Le Roi de Feu (2015, 2016, 2017)
- "Migrations" series (since 2012)
- Rhône, in Arles, for the launch of Marseille Provence, European Capital of Culture 2013
- Focus – La Saga des Photons, for the launch of Dunkirk Regional Capital of Culture 2013
- À Fleur de Peau (on tour since 2014)
- At Pont du Gard : Lux Populi (2008), Impressions (2011), Ludolux (2012), Ulysse au pays des merveilles (2013), Le Magicien d’eau (2014), Les Mondes Magiques (2015), Feux Gaulois (2016), Feux Romains (2017).
- Suspended time, original creation for the 50th anniversary of the Beatles album Sgt. Pepper's Lonely Hearts Club Band at the Sgt Pepper at 50 festival in Liverpool, 2017
- Vives réflexions, inauguration show of Louvre Abu Dhabi, 2017

=== Main pyrotechnic designs ===
- 1992 Summer Olympics closing ceremony in Barcelona
- 1998 FIFA World Cup Final
- Transition to the year 2000 on the Eiffel Tower
- 2004 Summer Olympics opening ceremony, closing ceremony and 2004 Summer Paralympics in Athens
- Inauguration of the Rio–Antirrio Bridge, 2004
- Closing of the Universal Forum of Cultures in Barcelona, 2004
- New Year in London on the London Eye, 2004 to 2009
- 2006 Winter Olympics opening ceremony, 2006 Winter Olympics closing ceremony and 2006 Winter Paralympics in Turin
- Inauguration of the Museum of Islamic Art, Doha, 2008
- Opening of the Jeff Koons exhibition at the Palace of Versailles, 2008
- Inauguration of the Burj Khalifa 2010
- Opening and closing of the 2011 AFC Asian Cup in Doha
- Pyrotechnic design for Cai Guo-Qiang's "One Night Stand" at the 2013 Paris Nuit Blanche
- Fireworks on the Eiffel Tower on Bastille Day 2004, 2009, 2014, 2015, 2016, 2018
- Opening and closing ceremonies of the 2016 Summer Olympics and 2016 Summer Paralympics in Rio de Janeiro
- New Year at the Palace of Versailles, 2021

=== Main multimedia creations ===
- 150th anniversary of Gaudí at the Sagrada Família 2001
- 120th anniversary of the Eiffel Tower 2009
- Bicentenary of Mexico 2010
- « Les Noces Royales de Louis XIV » in Versailles 2010

== Works ==
Christophe Berthonneau has co-authored two books published by Actes Sud:

- Le Théâtre du Feu, in 2002.
- Feux Royaux à Versailles, in 2008.

== Awards ==
- Officer in the Order of Arts and Letters, 2011
- « Créateur sans frontière » award granted by Cultures France, 2007
- TEA Award for outstanding achievement for « The Year 2000 Starting Signal » on the Eiffel Tower, 2000
- Recognised by Vanity Fair (1)as one of the 50 most influential Frenchmen, 2015
- Honorary Citizen of Maubeuge and Arles
