= Hey Girl =

Hey Girl may refer to:

== Film, TV and theatre ==
- Hey Girl (TV series) a TV show on MTV
- Hey Girl (play), a nontraditional theater piece by Italian director Romeo Castellucci

== Music ==
- Hey Girl (group), a Taiwanese Mandopop group
- Hey Girl! Records, is a music label based on Madrid De Los Trillos, Spain

=== Songs ===
- "Hey Girl" (Anne Wilson song)
- "Hey Girl" (Billy Currington song)
- "Hey Girl" (Delays song)
- "Hey Girl" (Freddie Scott song), written by Gerry Goffin and Carole King, covered by Billy Joel and several other artists
- "Hey Girl" (Small Faces song)
- "Hey Girl (This Is Our Time)", by CDB
- "Hey Girl" by Eddie Meduza from West a Fool Away
- "Hey Girl", by Estelle from The 18th Day
- "Hey Girl", by Hardline from II
- "Hey Girl", by Justin Bieber from Believe
- "Hey Girl", by Lady Gaga featuring Florence Welch from Joanne
- "Hey Girl", by O.A.R. from In Between Now and Then
- "Hey Girl", by Them featuring Van Morrison from Them Again
- "Hey Girl", by Zooey Deschanel and used as the theme song of the sitcom New Girl
