= The Haunted Mind =

1835 short story by Nathaniel Hawthorne

"The Haunted Mind" is a short story by Nathaniel Hawthorne. It was first published in The Token and Atlantic Souvenir, 1835. It was later included in Volume Two of Twice-Told Tales, a collection of short stories by Hawthorne published in 1837.

== Plot summary ==
In "The Haunted Mind", Hawthorne described an intermediate space between sleeping and waking. This story explores the introspective journey of a person who awakens in the middle of the night. It begins with the disorienting moment of transition from deep sleep to wakefulness, where the remnants of dreams seem momentarily tangible. The sound of a distant church clock prompts a contemplative mood, leading the individual to ponder the elusive nature of time, the ephemeral quality of the past, and the uncertainty of the future.

In the comfort of the bed, thoughts veer towards the contrasting sensations of warmth and the chilling imagery of death and graves, evoking a sense of gloom. The mind, in its vulnerable and semi-conscious state, conjures vivid personifications of personal sorrows, disappointments, and shames. These are depicted as spectral figures, each embodying different facets of the individual's emotional history and regrets.

Attempting to escape these haunting thoughts, the individual focuses on the familiar and mundane aspects of the surrounding room. Despite these efforts, the enveloping darkness seems to amplify the internal sense of despair. A longing for the comforting presence of a loved one emerges, with the imagination painting a picture of shared peace and tranquility.

As the narrative progresses, the individual enters a state of semi-consciousness where reality blends with dreamlike imagery. This phase is filled with scenes of natural beauty, joy, and simple pleasures, offering a respite from the earlier turmoil. This serene interlude, however, is punctuated by a realization of life's similarities to this fleeting hour—both are mysterious journeys with elements beyond control.

The work concludes with the character gradually returning to deep sleep, marked by the fading chimes of the distant clock. This descent into sleep is likened to a temporary death, with a hopeful note that the final passage of the soul into eternity might be as serene and familiar as this nightly transition.

== Quotes ==
"In the depth of every heart, there is a tomb and a dungeon, though the lights, the music, and revelry above may cause us to forget their existence, and the buried ones, or prisoners whom they hide." "She was your fondest Hope, but a delusive one."
