= The Minister's Black Veil =

1836 short story by Nathaniel Hawthorne

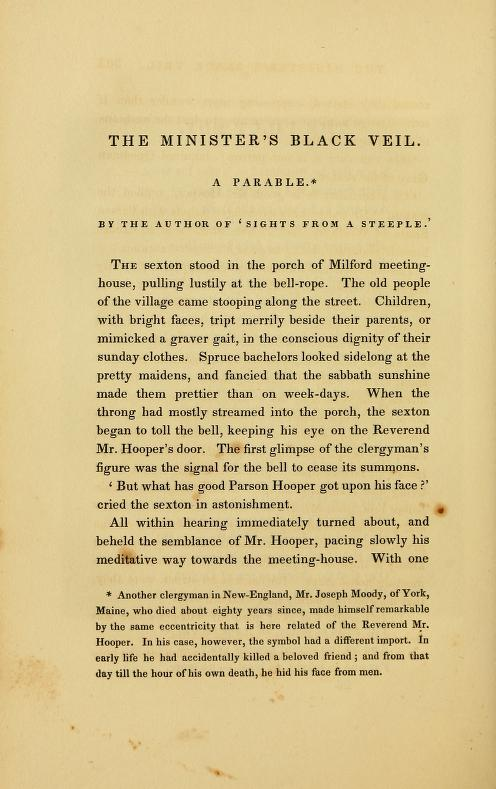
"The Minister's Black Veil", as it first appeared in 1836

"The Minister's Black Veil" is a short story written by Nathaniel Hawthorne. It was first published in the 1836 edition of The Token and Atlantic Souvenir, edited by Samuel Goodrich. It later appeared in Twice-Told Tales, a collection of short stories by Hawthorne published in 1837.

== Plot summary ==
The story begins with the sexton standing in front of the meeting-house, ringing the bell. He is to stop ringing the bell when the Reverend Mr. Hooper comes into sight. However, the congregation is met with an unusual sight: Mr. Hooper is wearing a black semi-transparent veil that obscures all of his face but his mouth and chin from view. This creates a stir among the townspeople, who begin to speculate about his veil and its significance. As he takes the pulpit, Mr. Hooper's sermon is on secret sin and is "tinged, rather more darkly than usual, with the gentle gloom of Mr. Hooper's temperament". This topic concerns the congregation who fear for their own secret sins as well as their minister's new appearance. After the sermon, a funeral is held for a young lady of the town who has died. Mr. Hooper stays for the funeral and continues to wear his now more appropriate veil. It is said that if the veil were to blow away, he might be "fearful of her glance". Mr. Hooper says a few prayers and the body is carried away. Two of the mourners say that they have had a fancy that "the minister and the maiden's spirit were walking hand in hand". That night another occasion arises, this time a joyous one—a wedding. However, Mr. Hooper arrives in his veil again, bringing the atmosphere of the wedding down to gloom.

By the next day, even the local children are talking of the strange change that seems to have come over their minister. Yet, no one is able to ask Mr. Hooper directly about the veil, except for his fiancée Elizabeth. Elizabeth tries to be cheerful and have him take it off. He will not do so, even when they are alone together, nor will he tell her why he wears the veil. Eventually, she gives up and tells him goodbye, breaking off the engagement.

The one positive benefit of the veil is that Mr. Hooper becomes a more efficient clergyman, gaining many converts who feel that they too are behind the black veil with him. Dying sinners call out for him alone. Mr. Hooper lives his life thus, though he is promoted to Father, until his death. According to the text, "All through life the black veil had hung between him and the world: it had separated him from cheerful brotherhood and woman's love, and kept him in that saddest of all prisons, his own heart; and still it lay upon his face, as if to deepen the gloom of his dark-some chamber, and shade him from the sunshine of eternity".

Even though Elizabeth broke off their engagement, she never marries and still keeps track of the happenings of Hooper's life from afar. When she finds out that he is deathly ill she comes to his death bed to be by his side. Elizabeth and the Reverend ask him once again to remove the veil, but he refuses. As he dies, those around him tremble. He tells them in anger not to tremble, not merely for him but for themselves, for they all wear black veils. Father Hooper is buried with the black veil on his face.

== Development and publication history ==
Hawthorne may have been inspired by a true event. A clergyman named Joseph Moody of York, Maine, nicknamed "Handkerchief Moody", accidentally killed a friend when he was a young man and wore a black veil from the man's funeral until his own death.

The story was published as "The Minister's Black Veil, a Parable" and credited "by the author of Sights from a Steeple" in The Token and Atlantic Souvenir for 1836; the issue also included Hawthorne's "The May-Pole of Merry Mount" and "The Wedding Knell". It was later included in the collection Twice-Told Tales.

== Analysis ==
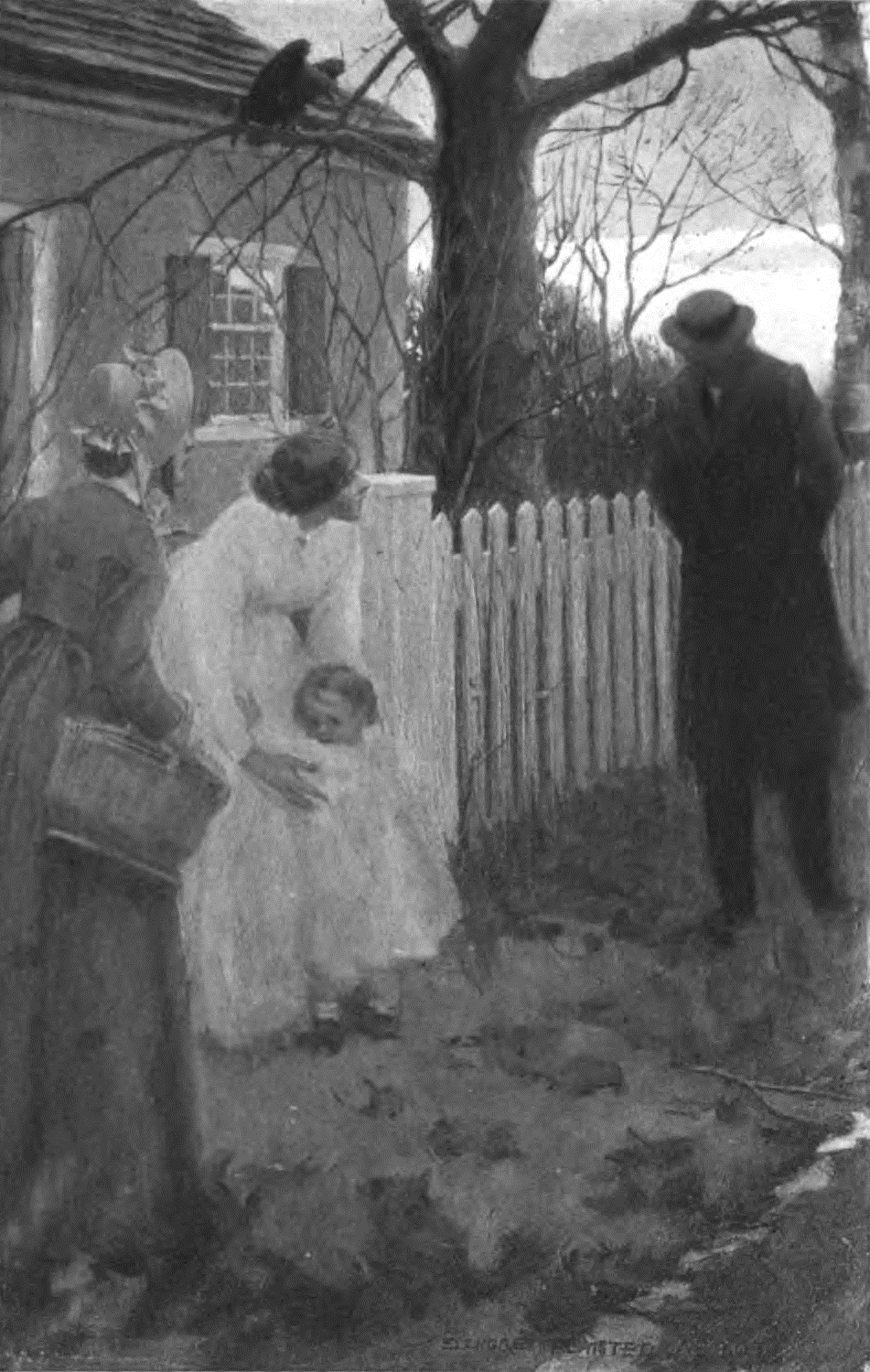
"The children fled from his approach", illustration by Elenore Abbott, 1900

Like many of Hawthorne's works, the setting of the story is a town in Puritan New England. The scene provides the backdrop for a psychological exploration of the themes of sin, repentance, and morality. Much of the story focuses on the acrimonious reaction of the congregation to the seemingly benign veil. Hawthorne uses their reaction as a critique of the Puritan image of original sin, using the veil as a representation not of "secret sin" but the inherent sinful nature of all people.

The story is both allegorical and didactic. The main themes are hidden sin and underlying guilt, with Hooper's method of preaching being to wear his sin on his face in a literal way. The townspeople grow uncomfortable with him because they start to become aware of their own sin. Hawthorne keeps the motive of the veil unknown to the reader. But the interpretation of the story generally rests on some moral assessment or explanation of the minister's symbolic self-veiling. Literary critic Edgar Allan Poe proposed that the issue of the minister's self-veiling was a mystery conceived to be solved or inferred by the reader. While Poe proposed this, Hawthorne never lets the reader know the reasoning behind the veil. While the veil is the main symbol in the story, it is also ironic. Hooper, in his stubborn use of the veil parable of one sin, is unconsciously guilty of a greater sin: that of egotistically warping the total meaning of life. In addition to standing for a man's concealment or hypocrisy and for Hooper's own sin of pride with its isolating effects, it stands also for the hidden quality of second sin. Hawthorne's use of ambiguity can be portrayed in many different ways: the manipulation of setting, manipulation of lighting and effects, and the use of an unreliable narrator to weave a shocking story that could or could not be likely. The narrator's credibility tends to be questionable because it is not a direct source. In using a third-person narrator, the minister's motives are never solidified, which keeps up the suspense.

=== Hidden nature of guilt ===
Hooper arouses in a sermon the notion of secret sin and the sad mysteries in which we hide from our nearest and dearest. Hooper acknowledges the problem of sin, the guilt that is admitted openly, and the guilt of sin that is repressed or hidden from the world. When the Reverend Hooper makes the people aware of the darkness within his being, he dissolves the barrier between his repugnant, repressed self and his conscious self. This barrier is characterized by the veil, which is transferred into the expression of hidden guilt. Hooper, in the story, announces to the congregation at his bedside that everyone wears a black veil; he implies that everyone has some form of secret guilt.

=== Communion of sinners ===
Hooper leads the townspeople in realizing that everyone shares sin no matter how much they try to avoid facing it. All people sin and it is up to them whether they face their sin or ignore it. Hooper tries to teach a lesson. In content, the lesson may be very much like the sermon on "secret sin" Hooper was scheduled to teach, but the townspeople are uncomfortable with the medium. The veil is something they have to see every day, rather than a sermon just once or twice a week.

=== Morality ===
Hawthorne's use of Hooper's veil teaches that whether we face it or not, we all sin and must accept what we have done, because judgment will come for everyone. Hooper decides to represent hidden sin and guilt in a literal way to reach out to his followers.

John H. Timmerman notes that because of Hawthorne's writing style Hooper's insistent use of the black veil, Hooper stands as one of his arch-villains. This is from Hooper's act of separating himself from the rest of humanity and denying his love for Elizabeth in favor of the veil.

== Symbols ==
The black veil is a symbol of secret sin and how terrible human nature can be. This could represent the secret sin that all people carry in their hearts, or it could be a representation of Mr. Hooper's specific sin, which some readers think to be adultery. Hooper as Everyman bearing his lonely fate in order to portray a tragic truth; and there is the implicit one of human imbalance, with Hooper's actions out of all proportion to need or benefit. Edgar Allan Poe speculated that Minister Hooper may have committed adultery with the lady who died at the beginning of the story, because this is the first day he begins to wear the veil, "and that a crime of dark dye, (having reference to the young lady) has been committed, is a point which only minds congenial with that of the author will perceive." Minister Hooper also seems to be unable to tell his fiancée why he wears the veil due to a promise he has made, and is not willing to show his face to the lady even in death. Finally, two funeral attendees see a vision of him walking hand in hand with the girl's spirit.

In a different view, the black veil could represent the Puritan obsession with sin and sinfulness. Puritans held beliefs of predestination and that only "God's elect" will be saved when the day of judgement comes, and this weeding out process of finding the saved versus not saved was a large part of Puritan life. The reaction to the minister's veil is one of annoyance and fear, "'I don't like it,' muttered an old woman, as she hobbled into the meetinghouse. 'He has changed himself into something awful, only by hiding his face.'" We are given no clues in the story up to this point as to how or why or when the minister came to have the black veil over his face, it is just there, and as far as we are told the minister is doing nothing different from his normal routine. The one and only difference is a simple veil covering his face and the way his congregation thinks about him now. This is Hawthorne criticizing the overly judgmental nature of the Puritans belief on sin, for them sin was an undeniable mistake, "Hooper need not have committed any specific sin; for the hardened Puritan, his humanity was sinful enough, and he wore it the way the medieval penitent would his hair shirt. Anything less than absolute perfection was absolute corruption"

On the next page following the old woman's quote Hawthorne uses the narrator to point out what the congregation is really feeling on the inside, even though their outward reaction displays something entirely different, "A subtle power was breathed in his words. Each member of the congregation, the most innocent girl, and the most hardened of breast, felt as if the preacher had crept upon them, behind his awful veil, and discovered their hoarded iniquity of deed or thought." This "iniquity of deed or thought" seems to hark back to the Spanish inquisition (hence the use of iniquity) and suggests the Puritan congregation is starting to realize their own faults: that being the overly harsh judgement they put on the minister and anyone else for superstitious things such as a black veil. The fear ultimately draws from the congregation's thoughts over being saved or not being saved. They sound loud and proud in being critical of the minister for his veil, but they are clearly weak and not confident inside their own minds about their personal salvation, so the harsh judgement of others could possibly be seen as a way to relieve themselves for a people were never sure about whether they were really going to heaven.

== Critical response ==
When the story was published in Twice-Told Tales, an anonymous reviewer in the Boston Daily Advertiser for March 10, 1837, noted that he preferred "the grace and sweetness of such papers as 'Little Annie's Ramble,' or 'A Rill from the Town-pump,' to those of a more ambitious cast, and in which the page glows with a wider and more fearful interest, like 'The Minister's Black Veil' and 'Dr. Heidegger's Experiment.'" Edgar Allan Poe offered a few critiques of Nathaniel Hawthorne's tales. Hawthorne received a mixed review from Poe, who writes that "high imaginations gleam from every page". He notes, however, that versatility is lacking in Hawthorne's tone and character development. Poe claims that Hawthorne is a man of "truest genius" but needs to work on subject areas of his writing. In his review of Twice-Told Tales, Poe also reveals a disdain for allegory, a tool which Hawthorne uses extensively.

== Legacy and adaptations ==
Reverend Hooper's sermon in the short story was the launching point of the dramatic work The Minister's Black Veil by Socìetas Raffaello Sanzio (2016), directed by Romeo Castellucci, with Willem Dafoe as Reverend Hooper, text by Claudia Castellucci and original music and sound design by Scott Gibbons.
