= Twice-Told Tales =

Short story collection by Nathaniel Hawthorne

- Cover of the first edition
- Author: Nathaniel Hawthorne
- Language: English
- Genre: Short stories
- Publisher: American Stationers Co.
- Publication date: 1837
- Publication place: United States
- Media type: Print (hardback)
- Pages: 334 pp

Twice-Told Tales is a short story collection in two volumes by Nathaniel Hawthorne. The first volume was published in the spring of 1837 and the second in 1842. The stories had all been previously published in magazines and annuals, hence the name.

== Publication ==
Hawthorne was encouraged by friend Horatio Bridge to collect these previously anonymous stories; Bridge offered $250 to cover the risk of the publication. Many had been published in The Token, edited by Samuel Griswold Goodrich. When the works became popular, Bridge revealed Hawthorne as the author in a review he published in the Boston Post.

The title Twice-Told Tales was based on a line from William Shakespeare's King John (Act 3, scene 4): "Life is as tedious as a twice-told tale, / Vexing the dull ear of a drowsy man." The quote referenced may also be Hawthorne's way of acknowledging a belief that many of his stories were ironic retellings of familiar tropes. The title also alludes to the last four lines of Book XII of the Odyssey by Homer. In Alexander Pope's translation, Odysseus finishes telling the tale of his journeys to Queen Arête, King Alkinoös and the Phaiakian court:

My following fates to thee, O king, are known,

And the bright partner of thy royal throne.
Enough: in misery can words avail?

And what so tedious as a twice-told tale?

The book was published by the American Stationers' Company on March 6, 1837; its cover price was $1. Hawthorne had help in promoting the book from Elizabeth Peabody. She sent copies of the collection to William Wordsworth and to Horace Mann, hoping that Mann could get Hawthorne a job writing stories for schoolchildren. After publication, Hawthorne asked a friend to check with the local bookstore to see how it was selling. After noting the initial expenses for publishing had not been met, he complained: "Surely the book was puffed enough to meet with sale. What the devil's the matter?" By June, between 600 and 700 copies were sold but sales were halted by the Panic of 1837, and the publisher went out of business within a year.

On October 11, 1841, Hawthorne signed a contract with publisher James Munroe to issue a two-volume edition of Twice-Told Tales with 21 more works than the previous edition. 1,000 copies were published in December of that year with a cover price of $2.25; Hawthorne was paid 10% per copy. Hawthorne complained that he still struggled financially. Editor John L. O'Sullivan suggested Hawthorne buy back unsold copies of Twice-Told Tales so that they could be reissued through a different publisher. At the time of this suggestion, 1844, there were 600 unsold copies of the book. Hawthorne lamented "I wish Heaven would make me rich enough to buy the copies for the purpose of burning them."

After the success of The Scarlet Letter in 1850, Twice-Told Tales was reissued with the help of publisher James T. Fields. In a new preface, Hawthorne wrote that the stories "may be understood and felt by anybody, who will give himself the trouble to read it, and will take up the book in a proper mood."

== Critical response ==
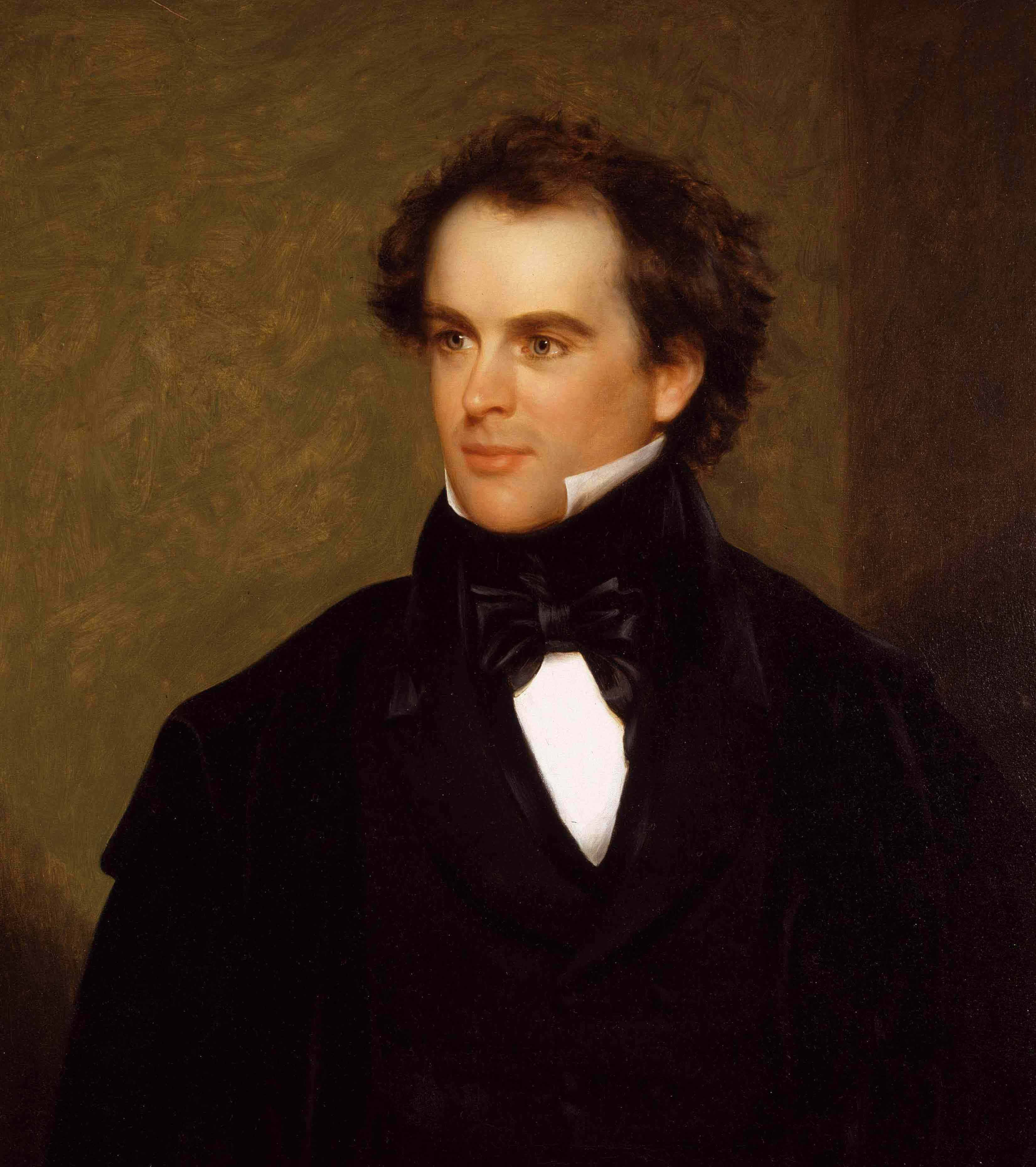
Nathaniel Hawthorne portrait by Charles Osgood, 1840

About a week after the publication of the book, Hawthorne sent a copy to the poet Henry Wadsworth Longfellow, his classmate from Bowdoin College. Longfellow had given a speech at their commencement calling for notable contributions to American literature. By this time, Longfellow was working at Harvard University and becoming popular as a poet. Hawthorne wrote to him "We were not, it is true, so well acquainted at college, that I can plead an absolute right to inflict my 'twice-told' tediousness upon you; but I have often regretted that we were not better known." In his 15-page critique in the April issue of the North American Review, Longfellow praised the book as a work of genius. "To this little book", Longfellow wrote, "we would say, 'Live ever, sweet, sweet book.' It comes from the hand of a man of genius." For his review of the second edition, Longfellow noted that Hawthorne's writing "is characterized by a large proportion of feminine elements, depth and tenderness of feeling, exceeding purity of mind." He referred to the collection's "The Gentle Boy" as "on the whole, the finest thing he ever wrote". The two authors would eventually build a strong friendship.

Generally, reviews were positive. Park Benjamin, Sr. stated that the author was "a rose baptized in dew". For the Boston Quarterly Review, Orestes Brownson noted Hawthorne's writings as "a pure and living stream of manly thought and feeling, which characterizes always the true man, the Christian, the republican and the patriot." After reading Twice-Told Tales, Herman Melville wrote to Evert Augustus Duyckinck that the stories weren't meaty enough. "Their deeper meanings are worthy of a Brahmin. Still there is something lacking—a good deal lacking to the plump sphericity of the man. What is that?—He does'nt [sic] patronise the butcher—he needs roast-beef, done rare."

Edgar Allan Poe wrote a well-known, two-part review of the second edition of Twice-Told Tales, published in the April and May 1842 issues of Graham's Magazine. Poe particularly praised Hawthorne's originality as "remarkable". He nonetheless criticized Hawthorne's reliance on allegory and the didactic, something he called a "heresy" to American literature. He did, however, express praise at the use of short stories (Poe was a tale-writer himself) and said they "rivet the attention" of the reader. Poe admitted, "The style of Hawthorne is purity itself. His tone is singularly effective--wild, plaintive, thoughtful, and in full accordance with his themes." He concluded that, "we look upon him as one of the few men of indisputable genius to whom our country has as yet given birth."

The Grolier Club later named Twice-Told Tales the most influential book of 1837.

== Contents ==
- "The Gray Champion"
- "Sunday at Home"
- "The Wedding-Knell"
- "The Minister's Black Veil"
- "The May-Pole of Merry Mount"
- "The Gentle Boy"
- "Mr. Higginbotham's Catastrophe"
- "Little Annie's Ramble"
- "Wakefield"
- "A Rill from the Town-Pump"
- "The Great Carbuncle"
- "The Prophetic Pictures"
- "David Swan"
- "Sights from a Steeple"
- "The Hollow of the Three Hills"
- "The Toll-Gatherer's Day"
- "The Vision of the Fountain"
- "Fancy's Show Box"
- "Dr. Heidegger's Experiment"
- "Legends of the Province-House"
  - I. "Howe's Masquerade"
  - II. "Edward Randolph's Portrait"
  - III. "Lady Eleanore's Mantle"
  - IV. "Old Esther Dudley"
- "The Haunted Mind"
- "The Village Uncle"
- "The Ambitious Guest"
- "The Sister Years"
- "Snow-Flakes"
- "The Seven Vagabonds"
- "The White Old Maid"
- "Peter Goldthwaite's Treasure"
- "Chippings with a Chisel"
- "The Shaker Bridal"
- "Night Sketches"
- "Endicott and the Red Cross"
- "The Lily's Quest"
- "Foot-prints on the Sea-shore"
- "Edward Fane's Rosebud"
- "The Threefold Destiny"

== Adaptations ==
In 1963, United Artists released a horror trilogy film titled Twice-Told Tales, with content very loosely adapted from three Hawthorne stories. The three stories were: "Dr. Heidegger's Experiment", which actually was one of the "Twice-Told Tales"; the Hawthorne novel The House of the Seven Gables; and another short story, "Rappaccini's Daughter". The film is regarded as a classic of sorts in the field of low-budget Hollywood horror, with Vincent Price, Sebastian Cabot, and Beverly Garland performing. The 2016 film Wakefield is a modern adaptation of the story of the same name.
