= The Great Carbuncle =

1835 short story by Nathaniel Hawthorne

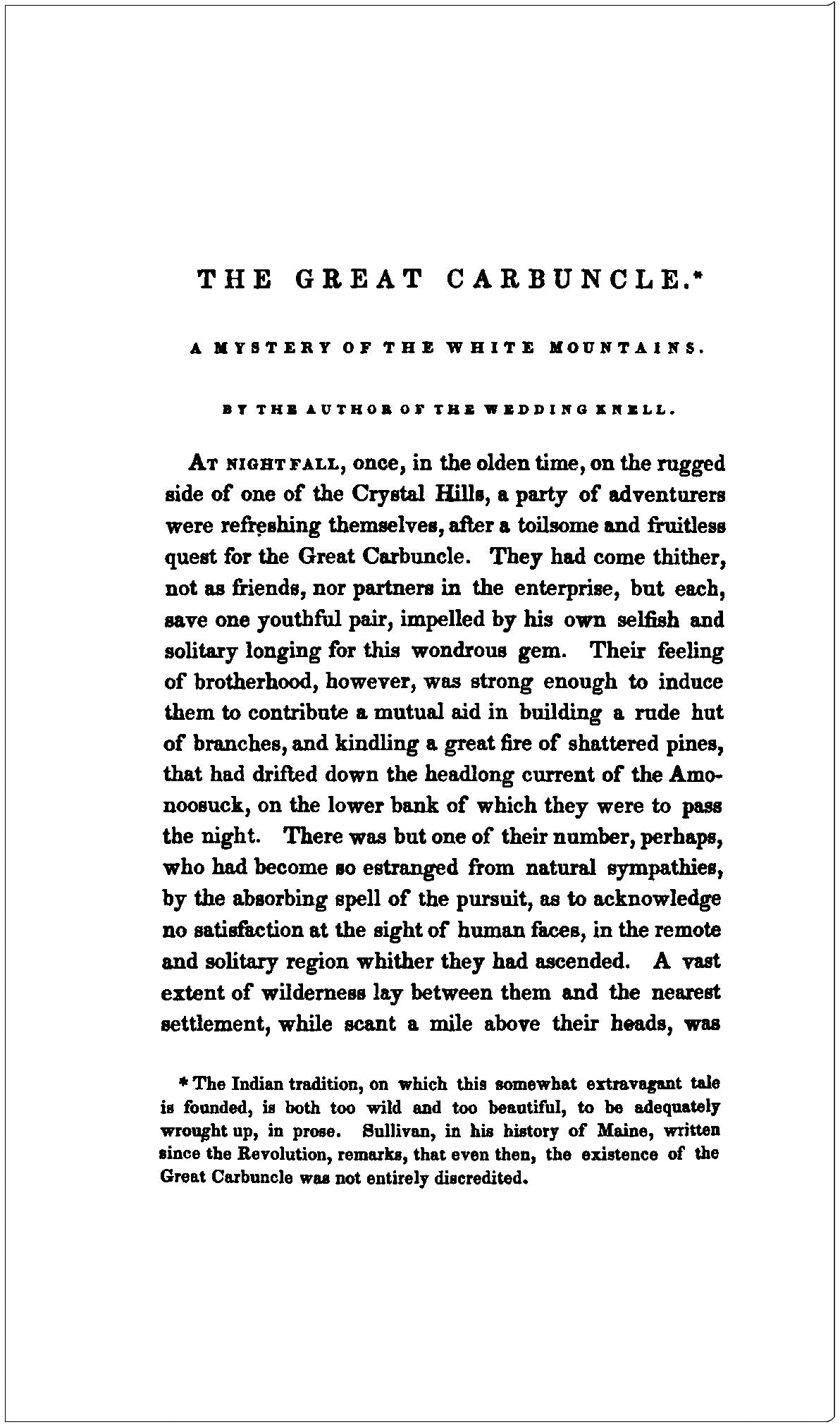
First page of the anonymous first edition in the 1837 issue of The Token and Atlantic Souvenir (published in 1836)

"The Great Carbuncle" is a short story by Nathaniel Hawthorne. It first appeared in December 1835 before being included in the collection Twice-Told Tales in 1837.

== Plot synopsis ==
In the White Mountains, a band of eight adventurers gathers together. They are each on a personal quest for the Great Carbuncle, a brilliant gem legendary in its elusiveness. The adventurers are as follows:

- The Seeker: a 60-year-old man who has sought the Carbuncle his entire life, and who plans to die alongside it once he finds it.
- Doctor Cacaphodel: a European chemist, who intends to analyze the Carbuncle and publish his findings.
- Master Ichabod Pigsnort: a merchant, who wishes to sell the Carbuncle to the highest bidder.
- The Cynic: a bespectacled man with a constant sneer. He considers the hopes of the other adventurers futile and makes derisive comments about them. His goal is to prove that the Carbuncle does not exist by searching everywhere for it.
- The Poet: a man who hopes the Carbuncle will bring him inspiration.
- Lord de Vere: a wealthy prince, who wants to use the Carbuncle's brilliance as a symbol of his family's greatness for posterity.
- Matthew and Hannah: newlyweds, who wish to use the gem as a light in their household and as a conversation piece.

The next morning, Matthew and Hannah wake up realizing that the others have left before them. Even though they fear they have lost the Carbuncle, they take their time in preparing for their morning's adventure. As they begin to climb a great mountain, they find themselves surrounded by the mists at its peak and fear that they will become lost. Spying a great red brilliance, though, they realize that the Carbuncle must be near and find it atop a cliff overlooking a lake. At the base of the cliff lies the Seeker, who has already died trying to reach the gem. The Cynic approaches and claims that he cannot see the Carbuncle; at Matthew's urging, he removes his spectacles and is permanently blinded by its brilliance. Matthew and Hannah decide to leave it where it is, knowing that it will overwhelm everything else in the world, and lead the Cynic down the mountain.

The story closes with an account of the other searchers' fortunes after this adventure:

- Pigsnort loses his fortune due to capture by Indians and the failure of his business.
- Cacaphodel analyzes a piece of ordinary granite from the mountain and publishes his findings – as extensive as they would have been if he had used the Carbuncle itself - in a European scientific journal.
- The Poet finds a piece of ice, which he claims is a perfect match for his idea of the Carbuncle, and is inspired by it to write bleak, cold verses.
- De Vere spends his life pondering his ancestors' greatness; when he dies, he is laid to rest among them with only torches to highlight his vanity.
- The Cynic wanders the world in desperate search of any light that he can perceive, and eventually dies in the Great Fire of London.
- Matthew and Hannah live a long and peaceful life together, often telling the tale of their search.

Conflicting reports begin to spread as to the fate of the Carbuncle. Some accounts claim that it lost its luster and became an ordinary stone; others contend that it fell into the lake, and that the Seeker's spirit can sometimes be seen bending down toward it. A few people believe that the Carbuncle still retains its original glory and venture into the mountains after it – and the narrator reveals that he is one of them.

== Publication history ==
Hawthorne was informed by a trip to Vermont and New Hampshire beginning in September 1832. "The Great Carbuncle" was published in the December 1835 issue of The New-England Magazine as the second (and final) installment of his series "Sketches from Memory, By a Pedestrian", after "The Ambitious Guest" in the previous issue. These two stories were among several of Hawthorne's works inspired by the White Mountains, along with his story "The Great Stone Face" and a nonfiction essay titled "Our Evening Party Among the Mountains".

The story was republished as "The Great Carbuncle, a Mystery of the White Mountains" credited as "by the author of The Wedding Knell" in the annual The Token and Atlantic Souvenir in 1837. It was finally published with the author's name in the compilation Mosses from an Old Manse (1846).

== Analysis ==
Hawthorne explores the importance of honesty, simplicity, and selflessness in "The Great Carbuncle." These positive characteristics are most often demonstrated by Hannah and Matthew during the search for the Carbuncle; they sacrifice personal gain, alter their goals, and pivot their actions to assist others for the good of the group.

By contrast, characters' selfish motivations and greed elicit negative results. The other six adventurers refuse to abandon their personal interests in the quest; for example, Doctor Cacaphodel wants to enhance his reputation by studying the Carbuncle, the Poet wants to use it an inspiration for his writing, and the Cynic is determined to disprove its existence. Each of these characters meets a different, and sometimes tragic, fate related to their intended use for the stone. The story reinforces Hawthorne's value of selflessness and simplicity as opposed to selfishness and greed.

This story also suggests that hard work and determination do not guarantee success. Though most of the characters are experts in their given fields, their knowledge does not help them at all.
