= Moody Homestead =

Historic house in Maine, United States

- U.S. National Register of Historic Places
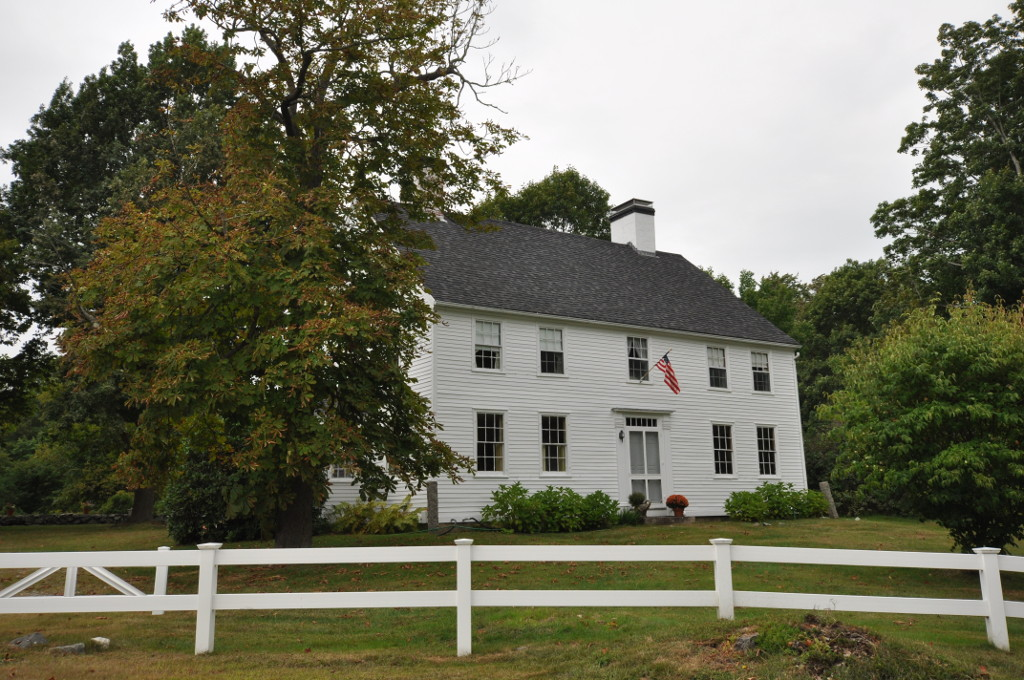

- Location within Maine Location within the United States
- Location: 100 Ridge Rd., York, Maine
- Coordinates: 43°9′23″N 70°38′2″W
- Area: 2 acres (0.81 ha)
- Built: 1790
- Built by: Josepy Moody
- NRHP reference No.: 75000209
- Added to NRHP: April 28, 1975

The Moody Homestead is a historic house at 100 Ridge Road in York, Maine. The main house, built in 1790, is attached to an ell that is estimated to date to the late 17th century. The house has been owned by descendants of the locally prominent Moody family since the 1770s. It was listed on the National Register of Historic Places in 1975.

== Description and history ==
The Moody house is located on the northwest side of Ridge Road in central York, about halfway between York Harbor and the Cape Neddick area. Its main block is a 2 1/2-story wood-frame structure, with a side-gable roof, twin interior chimneys, and clapboard siding. To the rear is a 1 1/2-story ell, estimated to date to 1690–1700, which connects the main block to a barn. The main block has typical Georgian features, including a five-bay facade with central entrance. Each gable end has a small projecting vestibule, of which the south-facing one also has an entrance. The interior has a central-hall plan, with two rooms on either side of a generous center hall and stairway.

The rear ell of the house was probably built by a member of the Stone family, who sold that house, along with a substantial tract of land, to Joseph Moody. Moody was the grandson of Rev. Samuel Moody of Byfield, Massachusetts, who served as York's minister for many years, and whose later descendants include Ralph Waldo Emerson. The younger Moody was also ordained a minister, and was active in civic affairs of the town of York and York County. He had a habit of covering his face with a dark cloth, apparently due to the shame over a hunting accident in which a friend was killed. His habit is said to be the inspiration behind Nathaniel Hawthorne's short story, "The Minister's Black Veil". The design of the main house, erected for Moody in 1790, is said to be based on the house of William Dummer in Byfield, which still stands on the grounds of The Governor's Academy. At the time of the house's listing on the National Register of Historic Places in 1975, it was still owned by Moody's descendants.

== See also ==
- National Register of Historic Places listings in York County, Maine
