= The Ambitious Guest =

1835 short story by Nathaniel Hawthorne

- Short story by Nathaniel Hawthorne

Publication
- Published in: The New-England Magazine
- Publication date: June 1835

"The Ambitious Guest" is a short story by Nathaniel Hawthorne. First published in The New-England Magazine in June 1835, it was republished in the second volume of Twice-Told Tales in 1841.

== Plot ==
A young traveler stops for the night with a family that lives in a "notch" next to a mountain. They make friendly conversation, interrupted once by the sound of a wagon carrying other travelers, and then by the sound of rocks falling from the slope. The father reassures the visitor that rockfalls happen regularly without causing harm, but that the family has a "safe place" to go in the event of a serious collapse.

The group carries on with their friendly conversation. The visitor acknowledges that he is young and has no accomplishments of note, but hopes he will have "achieved my destiny" before he dies and then "I shall have built my monument!" The father expresses the wish for a more humble legacy.

Suddenly, they hear the sound of a much larger avalanche. They scream in fear of "The Slide!" and bolt outside for their safe place. But they are all caught up in the rock slide and killed, while the house is completely undamaged. Their bodies are swept away and never found. Locals mourn the loss of the family but are unaware of their ambitious guest.

== Composition and publication history ==
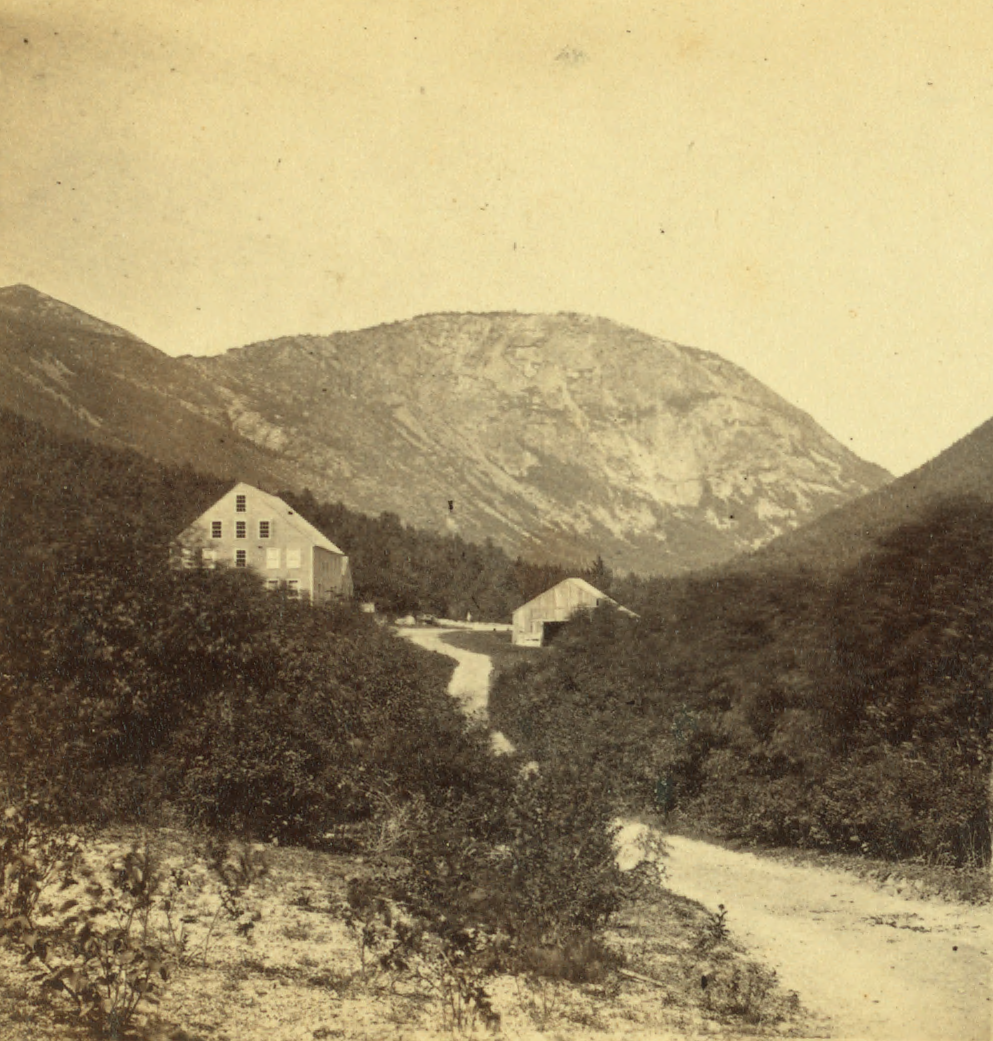
"The Ambitious Guest" was inspired by a real-life incident at the Willey House in New Hampshire in 1826.

The basis of the story is the Willey tragedy of Crawford Notch, New Hampshire. On August 28, 1826, a family living in the Notch of the White Mountains was killed by an avalanche as they rushed from their home attempting to seek safety. The home they fled, however, was unharmed. Hawthorne visited the area four years later. He was also inspired by a trip beginning in September 1832 that took him through New Hampshire and Vermont.

"The Ambitious Guest" was published as the first of a series of travel pieces he titled "Sketches from Memory, By a Pedestrian", in the November 1835 issue of The New-England Magazine. The second in the series, "The Great Carbuncle", was published a month later before the series was discontinued. In addition to those two stories, Hawthorne also used the backdrop of the White Mountains in his story "The Great Stone Face" and in a nonfiction essay "Our Evening Party Among the Mountains".

Hawthorne biographer Brenda Wineapple suggests that "The Ambitious Guest" expresses Hawthorne's own desire for fame and uncertainty of the future at the early stage in his career when it was written. Christopher Johnson argues that the real protagonist of the story is nature itself, as evidenced by the personification of the mountain. Hawthorne is showing, then, that man's attempts to dominate nature are hubris and impossible.
