= Eric Sundquist =

American writer, academic and professor

- Born: 1952 (age 73–74)
- Occupation: professor
- Writing career
- Subjects: American literature, culture of the United States

Eric Sundquist (born 1952) is an American scholar of the literature and culture of the United States. Sundquist earned his B.A. from the University of Kansas (1974) and his Ph.D. from Johns Hopkins University (1978). Sundquist is the Andrew W. Mellon Professor of the Humanities Emeritus and former chair of the English Department at Johns Hopkins. He is a former member of the UCLA Department of English, and was Dean of the College of Arts and Sciences at Northwestern University.

== Awards ==
Sundquist was elected to the American Academy of Arts and Sciences in 1997 for contributions to his field. In 2006 he received the Andrew W. Mellon Foundation's Distinguished Achievement Award, the largest research award in the humanities.

== Personal life ==
Sundquist is a close personal friend of noted literary scholar and jazz musician Michael Colacurcio. Sundquist is also married and has a few stepchildren. He has quite a few grandchildren whom he loves and adores. He currently resides in Virginia with his wife.

== Books ==
- King's Dream: The Legacy of Martin Luther King's "I Have a Dream" Speech (2009)
- Strangers in the Land: Blacks, Jews, Post-Holocaust America (2005)
- To Wake the Nations: Race in the Making of American Literature (1993), winner of the James Russell Lowell Prize from the Modern Language Association for best book published during the year, the Christian Gauss Award from Phi Beta Kappa for the best book in the humanities, and a Choice Outstanding Academic Book Award.
- The Hammers of Creation: Folk Culture in Modern African-American Fiction (1992)
- Faulkner: The House Divided (1983)
- Home as Found: Authority and Genealogy in Nineteenth-Century American Literature (1978)
