= The New-England Magazine =

Literary periodical (1831-1835)

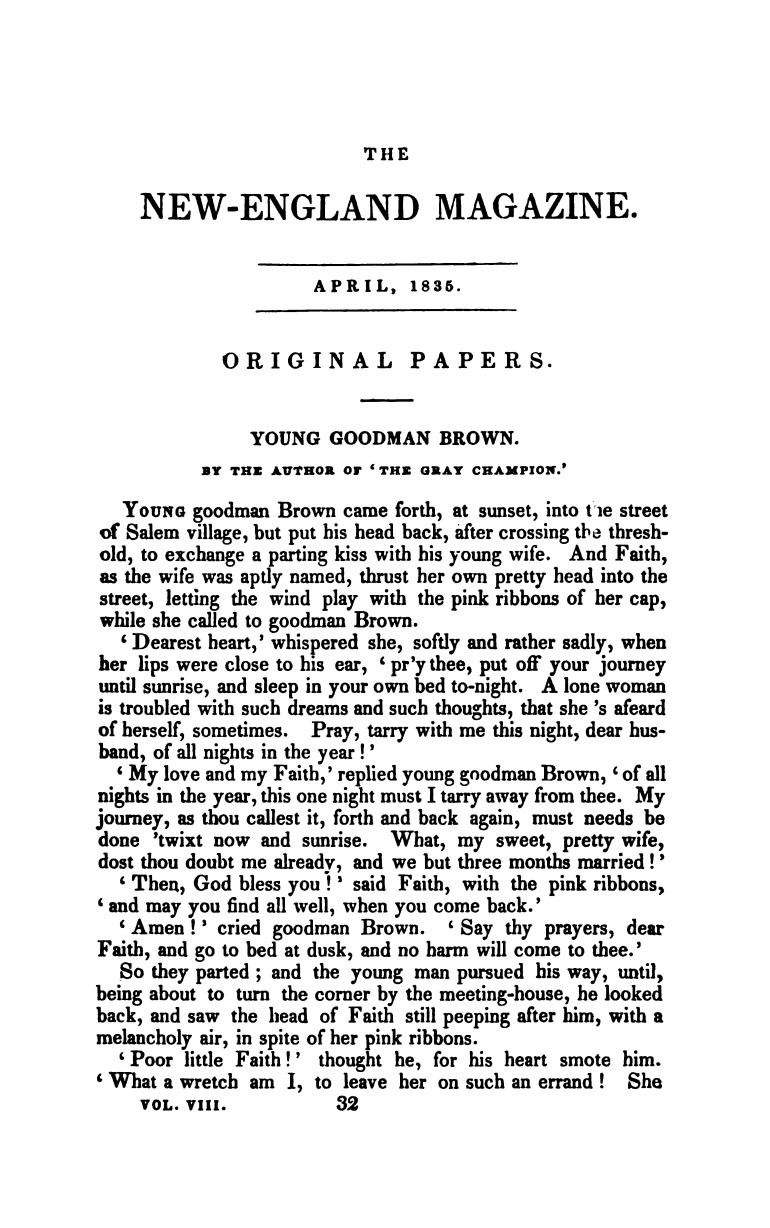
First page of "Young Goodman Brown" from The New-England Magazine, April 1835

The New-England Magazine was an American monthly literary magazine published in Boston, Massachusetts, from 1831 to 1835.

== Overview ==
The magazine was published by Joseph T. Buckingham and his son Edwin. The first edition was published in July 1831, and it published a total of 48 editions. After its final issue, in December 1835, the magazine merged with the New York-based American Monthly Magazine.

The magazine has been described as "one of antebellum America's few worthwhile literary journals". Its contributors included Nathaniel Langdon Frothingham, Henry Wadsworth Longfellow, Edward Everett, and Samuel Gridley Howe. Beginning in November 1831, Oliver Wendell Holmes Sr. included two essays that evolved into his "The Autocrat of the Breakfast-Table" series, which became his most popular prose works. Several of Nathaniel Hawthorne's early short stories were published in the magazine, including "The Ambitious Guest" (November 1835) and "The Great Carbuncle" (December 1835).

The magazine has no connection to The New England Magazine, a Boston publication published from 1884 to 1917.
