= Lady Eleanore's Mantle =

Short story by Nathaniel Hawthorne

"Lady Eleanore's Mantle" is the third legend in the four-part short story "Legends of the Province-House" by American author Nathaniel Hawthorne. This short story first appeared in The United States Democratic Review (Dec. 1838, Vol 2. Issue 12), and was later collected in an updated edition of Twice-Told Tales.

== Plot synopsis ==
Lady Eleanore Rochcliffe moves to Boston to live with her distant relative, Colonel Shute. She is known not only for her immense pride but also her magnificently embroidered mantle, which was made by a dying woman and is believed to possess magical qualities.

When she arrives in town, Jervase Helwyse, a man who loves her but only receives her scorn, offers for her to step on him as she exits her coach. She accepts his offer.

A ball is held in honor of her arrival. Although she remains within a circle, Rochcliffe looks upon the festivities with scorn. Helwyse arrives and asks Rochcliffe to drink from his silver cup to prove that she has not placed herself above the sympathies of others. He also asks her to remove her mantle. Laughing at him, she pulls it tighter over her head.

Shortly thereafter, an epidemic of smallpox appears. It attacks the rich and proud before affecting the poor. Red flags are erected outside the houses of the infected. Everyone believes that the mantle is the source of the epidemic, since it was made by a dying woman and is worn by one who has placed herself above human sympathies.

Helwyse arrives at Rochcliffe's province house and finds her on her death bed. Rochcliffe says Nature has retaliated against her since she has scorned others. She is buried with her mantle, and Helwyse leads the casket waving a red flag. Soon after, the epidemic subsides.

== Historical setting ==
Though not explicitly stated, the story is set in 1721 or 1722, after Shute assumed the governorship of Massachusetts Bay Colony and during a smallpox epidemic.
