= Socìetas Raffaello Sanzio =

- Formation: 1981
- Type: Theatre group
- Location: Cesena, Italy
- Members: Romeo and Claudia Castellucci; Chiara and Paolo Guidi
- Website: societas.es

The Socìetas Raffaello Sanzio (SRS) is an Italian experiential theater company founded in 1981. Its initial development was part of movement in Italian theater which did not require a background in theater but was influenced by rock, poetry, comics, television and more. By the end of the 1990s, the work done by this group had influenced a number of newer groups, winning awards for various works. The performances of this company shuns conventional coherent narrative and focuses more on visual and auditory impact, using silences, word fragments and even animals and machines as performers. The company is based in Cesena, near Bologna, Italy where it has its own theater, but it has performed in various venues in Europe, Asia, Oceana, and the Americas.

== History ==
Socìetas Raffaello Sanzio was founded in 1981 in the Italian city of Cesena by Claudia Castellucci (b. 1958), her brother Romeo Castellucci (b. 1960) and Chiara Guidi (b. 1960), together with Barbara Bertozzi, Letizia Biondi, Raffaele Wassen [Tamburini] and the production director Gabriele Gosti. Chiara's brother Paolo Guidi (b. 1962) joined them the following year. In 1979, members of the future company attended a performance by Italian theater company Magazzini Criminali (Criminal Warehouse). According to them, they were prompted to dedicate themselves to theater as they, especially Romeo Castellucci, opposed the museum-like quality of the performance, which lacked movement. The group first performed their first work at an apartment in Rome in November 1980, officially founding the company the following year, in Cesena, Italy, (near Bologna) first named Gruppo Espressione and then Esplorazineo Teatro. The young company embraced the Gesamtkunstwerk aesthetic, and originally all productions were written by members.

By the end of the 1980s, the group had changed name again, to Società Raffaello Sanzio, then tweaked to the Latin Societas. The name refers to artist Raphael (full Italian name Raffaello Sanzio), reflecting the group members’ education and interest in the arts. The use of Societas (Society) was chosen it indicate that they considered themselves a community, or Romeo Castellucci's explanation “a community of strangers.”

Their work of the first twenty years can be divided into three phases which correspond to three publications Teatro Iconoclasta (Iconoclastic Theater), Teatro della Super-Icona (Theater of the Super-Icon) and Epopea della polvere (Epic of Dust). During their first ten years, they were specifically interested in experimenting with different theatrical techniques and devices. Their work was based on ideas rather than dramatic texts, with the idea of making concepts material and communicating beyond language. For example, in La Generalissima, a new language was invented for one of the characters. Near the end of this period, they began adding non-human elements such as animals, either to represent something about a human character or an abstract concept. Early examples of this include Alla bellezza tanto antica (In Praise of Such Ancient Beauty - 1987), which had two pythons on the stage, followed by sheep, some goat and six baboons on the stage of La Discesa di Inanna (Inanna's Descent - 1989).

SRS had great impact on experimental theater companies in Italy in the 1990s such as Teatrino Clandestino, Fanny & Alexander, Impasto, Motus and Masque. By the 1990s, they were exploring myths such as Gilgamesh (1990) and deconstructions of classics such as in Amleto (1992) and Julius Cesar (1997) .

Claudia Castellucci is one of main philosophers of the group who has written numerous articles and other texts since the 1980s, including theoretical pieces on how art and life inter-relate. Moreover, the company sought to create new modes of expression beyond those traditionally found in dramatic art. For instance, they organized a series of rhetoric actions, the so-called oratorie (starting from 1983). These oratories functioned as abrupt interventions, frequently in non-theatrical spaces, during which a polemic text was declaimed in front of an audience demanding a level of “Ciceronian rhetoric”.

Tragedia Endogonidia expresses Claudia Castellucci's basic theory, initially touched upon in early works, that it is necessary to negate traditional theater language as every detail of the performance implies and reflects the entire point of it, and make that point universal. The series was initiated in Cesena in January 2002 and ended there in December 2004, with intermediate episodes in cities such as Brussels, Rome, Strasbourg, London and Marseille, with the episodes loosely based on the location in which they were shown. As an experiment with sound and its possibilities, the Socìetas Raffaello Sanzio presented the concert Voyage au bout de la nuit (1999), based on the novel by Louis-Ferdinand Céline, where the deconstruction of language involved elements of sound and rhythm, noises and phonetic inventions. Subsequently, the performance Il Combattimento (2000), from Montevedi's eighth book of madrigals, explored the sources of Western Opera.

In 1989, their home base became what is now the Comandini Theater in Cesena. Until 2004, the Theater opened its doors sporadically to the public and only during SRS events. Since that year, the company has decided to open its doors to the city, with performances of other groups and hosting festival, beginning with the 2005/2006 season of the “Contemporary Theater.” In 2008, it hosted “Nature” and “Mantica” events that blend academics and performance with seminars, lectures, conferences and shows.

== Artistry ==
The society is a community of artists who disdain the values of a world they feel they do not belong to. Individual members specialize in certain aspects of the production process, but have a say in all aspects of staging. According to Italian director Federico Tiezzi, Claudia Castellucci and Chiara Guidi are the intellectual soul of the company, with Romeo Castellucci and Paolo Guidi more in charge of its practical side. Despite their famous namesake's use of physical perspective in his paintings, the company reject this as it “…makes you lose the internal perspective… Chiara Guidi explains that “We start from the presumption that superficial and pleasing things should not be done ... we must do something that hits, something that transforms.”

The group is part of a movement in Italian theater in the 1970s and 1980s, where members did not necessarily have a background in theater, but were influenced by rock music, poetry, comics, television, advertisement and movies to create works with strong visual impact, in which linear coherent narrative was absent most of the time. SRS is part of the second wave of this movement, along with Teatro della Valdoca and Albe, both founded in the same region two years after SRS.

SRS development was distinct from their contemporaries in that they widened the definition of theater, using fragmented works, artificial silence, violent sounds and haunting music, including children and animals in performances along with the simple presence of bodies marked by aging, anorexia, obesity and illness, as well as animals and even self-operating machines as performers. The main idea behind the group is that theater is mostly based on the visuals and sound of the set. They also have worked to dismantle traditional theatrical language in order to create a new one, as well as to increase the audience's awareness of the nature of the stage and human's as “permanent spectators.”

== Europe Theatre Prize ==
In 2000, Socìetas Raffaello Sanzio was awarded the Europe Prize Theatrical Realities, received by Romeo Castellucci and Chiara Guidi in Taormina, with the following motivation:

Having come to the theatre from the visual arts, the Societas Raffaello Sanzio, which in twenty years' work has moved from a provocative ludic approach to the invention of a language, from iconoclastic theatre to a return to an imaginary Sumerian tradition, has now reached full maturity and taking the lead in new young drama by staging the great classics. Founded by two Castellucci and two Guidi brothers from Cesena, the Socìetas has remained an extended family group in which mothers, aunts, sons, daughters and animals all play a part, and has now taken on the new role of teaching new actors and children. It has also adapted a series of non-mystifying fairy-tales for the stage for children. But it has been the process of re-inventing the classics by personally re-experiencing them and focusing on the communication of energy, that led this company to tour the world and become the main attraction at major festivals. And now we have Romeo Castellucci's group moving from an autistic Hamlet prey to his animalistic physicality, in a mechanized context, to a radical reading of a different Shakespeare, based on a corporality that does not exclude disease; and hence to a cosmic vision in two weighty triptychs: the imaginary and creative Orestea and the memorable recreation of Genesis. This is a self-analysis of the superhuman work of the artist and a reflection on the history of man and the progress of science through the mystery of the relationship between good and evil, in an increasingly less verbal and more visual conception of the theatre, where the rapid sequence of the electric sparks of sound is an increasingly decisive factor in the emotional attack on the audience.

== Productions and venues ==
- Santa Sofia. Khmer Theatre, 1986
- Inanna's Descent, 1989
- Gilgamesh, 1990
- Isis and Osiris, 1990
- Hamlet - the Vehement Externalism of a Mollusc's Death, 1992
- Aesop's Fables, 1992
- Hänsel and Gretel, 1993
- Thumbkin, 1995
- Oresteia, an Organic Play?, 1995
- Donkeyskin, 1996
- Julius Caesar, 1997
- Genesi - from the Museum of Sleep, 1999
- Voyage au Bout de la Nuit, 1999
- The Combat, 2000
- Uovo di bocca, 2001
- Endogonidia Tragedy, 2002–2004

Venues aside from their own theater have included the Festival d’Avignon, the Hebbel Theater in Berlin, the Kunsten Festival des Arts, the International Festival Norway in Bergen, the Odéon Théâtre de l'Europe avec le Festival d'Automne in Paris, the Romaeuropafestival in Rome, Le Maillon Théâtre in Strasbourg, the London International Festival of Theater, Les Bernardines avec le Théâtre du Gymnase in Marseilles and the Festival Internacional Cervantino in Mexico.

Exhibitions include Rhetorica. Mene Tekel Peres, Bologna and Palermo, 2000; Uovo di bocca, Rome, 2001; To Cartage Then I Came, Festival d’Avignon, 2002 and Tempo incerto, Avellino, 2003.

== Other projects ==
The company has also published a number of books which include Dal teatro iconoclasta al teatro della super–icona, Socìetas Raffaello Sanzio, (Ubulibri, Milano 1992), Uovo di bocca - scritti lirici e drammatici, Claudia Castellucci, (Bollati Boringhieri, Torino, 2000), Rhetorica - Mene Tekel Peres, Romeo Castellucci, (Aldo Grompone, Roma, 2000), L'epopea della polvere - Il teatro della Socìetas Raffaello Sanzio (Ubulibri, Milano, 2001), Les Pélerins de la Matière - Theorie et Praxis du Théâtre - Ecrits de la Socìetas Raffaello Sanzio (Les Solitaires Intempestifs, Besançon 2001), To Carthage then I Came, Romeo Castellucci, Claudia Castellucci, Joe Kelleher, Nicolas Ridout (Actes Sud, Arles, 2002) and The Theater of the Socìetas Raffaello Sanzio, Claudia Castellucci, Romeo Castellucci, Chiara Guidi, Jooe Kelleher, Nicholas Ridout, (Routledge, New York, 2007).

Videos by the group and members include Brentano, by Romeo Castellucci, (1995, 25'), Diario sperimentale della scuola infantile anno I, by Chiara Guidi, Romeo Castellucci and Stefano Meldolesi (1996, 58’), Diario sperimentale della scuola infantile anno II, by Chiara Guidi and Romeo Castellucci (1997, 49’), Genesi - from the Museum of Sleep, by Cristiano Carloni and Stefano Franceschetti (2000, 60’), Epitaph, by Romeo Castellucci (2000, 8’), Le Pélerin de la Matière, by Cristiano Carloni and Stefano Franceschetti (2000, 45’), Cesena, by Romeo Castellucci (2002, 25’), Avignon, by Cristiano Carloni and Stefano Franceschetti (2003, 27’ and Tragedia Endogonidia - Socìetas Raffaello Sanzio, by Romeo Castellucci, video by Cristiano Carloni and Stefano Franceschetti, music by Scott Gibbons (2007, 340,15').

The Cryonic Chants - Objective Songs And Poems, Taken From An Impassive Animal by Scott Gibbons and Chiara Guidi, with video by Romeo Castellucci, (2004, 50'), was a musical performance, the tour of which was documented and released as a live recording on enhanced CD by the Sonic Invaders imprint of KML Recordings in 2008.

== Recognition ==
Their first award came in 1996 with the Special Ubu Prize for contributions to experimental theater. Since they have been awarded a number of awards including Premio Masque d’Or for Orestea, as best foreign performance of the year, Festival Theatre des Ameriques, Montreal, Quebec, 1997, Premio Europa Realtà Teatrali, Taormina, 2000, Best International Production for Genesi - from the Museum of Sleep, Dublin Theatre Festival, 2000 and Ubu Prizes for Genesi from the museum of sleep, as best performance of the year, 2000.

About the archive of Socìetas Raffaello Sanzio: www.arch-srs.com
