= The New England Magazine =

Literary periodical (1884-1917)

- Categories: literary magazine
- Frequency: Monthly
- Founded: 1884
- Final issue: 1917
- Country: United States
- Based in: Boston, Massachusetts
- Language: English

The New England Magazine was a monthly literary magazine published in Boston, Massachusetts, from 1884 to 1917. It was known as The Bay State Monthly from 1884 to 1886.

The magazine was published by J. N. McClinctock and Company.

The magazine has no connection to the 1830s publication The New-England Magazine.
