= Hey Girl! (play) =

Hey Girl! is a 2007 play by the Italian director Romeo Castellucci. According to the theatre critic Neil Genzlinger, Hey Girl! is a series of stage tableaux devoted to women or, more precisely, the history of the oppression of women.
