= Moody House (Bald Knob, Arkansas) =

Historic house in Arkansas, United States

- U.S. National Register of Historic Places
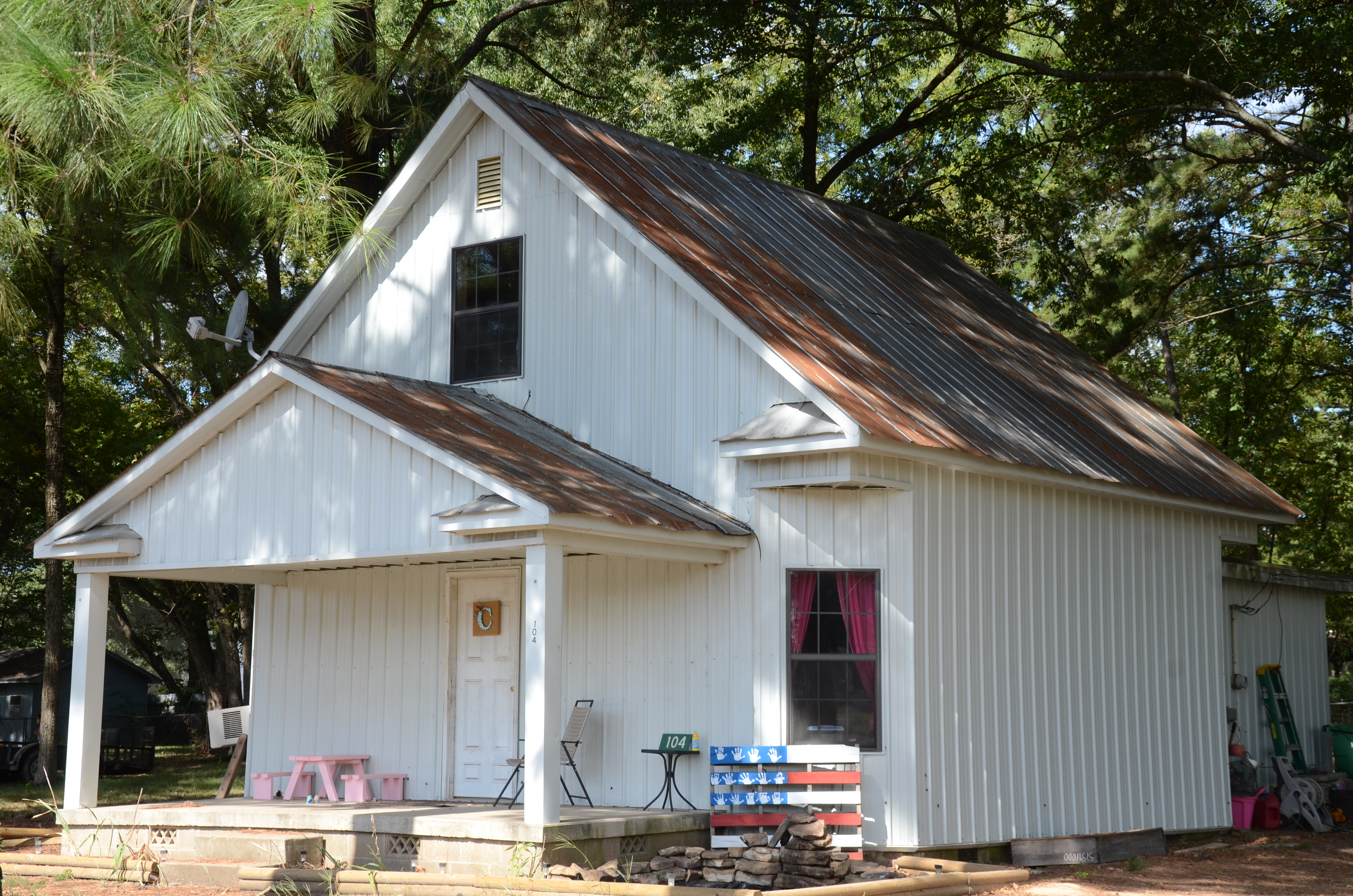

- Location within Arkansas Location within the United States
- Location: 104 Market St., Bald Knob, Arkansas
- Coordinates: 35°18′24″N 91°34′16″W
- Area: less than one acre
- Built: 1914
- Built by: A.P. Moody
- Architectural style: Frame gable entry
- MPS: White County MPS
- NRHP reference No.: 91001277
- Added to NRHP: July 20, 1992

The Moody House is a historic house at 104 Market Street in Bald Knob, Arkansas. It is a single-story wood-frame structure, with a gabled roof, vertical siding, and a foundation of brick piers. A gabled porch extends across most of the front, supported by box columns. Built about 1915, it is one of White County's few surviving houses from that period.

The house was listed on the National Register of Historic Places in 1992.

== See also ==
- National Register of Historic Places listings in White County, Arkansas
