= Michael J. Colacurcio =

American journalist (born 1939)

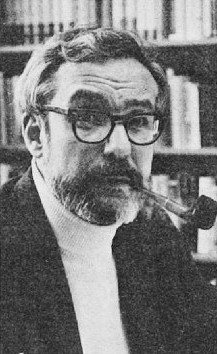
- Colacurcio c. 1979
- Born: July 2, 1939 (age 87); Cincinnati, Ohio, United States
- Occupations: Professor, scholar, educator
- Writing career
- Genre: American literature
- Subjects: Puritanism, 19th century American literature, Hawthorne
- Notable works: The Province of Piety, Doctrine and Difference, Godly Letters
- Website: www.english.ucla.edu/all-faculty/267-colacurcio-michael-j

Michael Joseph Colacurcio (born July 2, 1939) is a distinguished professor of English at University of California, Los Angeles. He specializes in American literature and literary history.

== Biographical information ==
=== Education and academic career ===
Michael Colacurcio studied at Xavier University (B.A., 1958; M.A., 1959) and the University of Illinois Urbana-Champaign (Ph.D., 1963). He taught English literature at Cornell University from 1963 to 1976 (during the 1968-1969 academic year he taught at Ohio State University). Colacurcio has taught at the University of California, Irvine, then at the University of California, Los Angeles (UCLA), where he currently teaches in the Department of English.

=== Scholarship ===
Colacurcio's main interest is American literature of the colonial and Romantic periods. While he has written extensively on such subjects as Puritanism, Herman Melville, and Ralph Waldo Emerson, he is perhaps best known for his scholarship on the work of Nathaniel Hawthorne.

The Province of Piety

In The Province of Piety, Colacurcio argues against symbolist or psychologizing interpretations and maintains that Hawthorne's fiction ought to be understood primarily as historical literature, that is, as it reflects on the moral history of his native New England.

Hawthorne "possessed the mind of a modern intellectual historian," according to Colacurcio, who compares his subject to the American historian Perry Miller: "For like Miller, it may be suggested, Hawthorne carried on a life-long dialectic with the historical 'thesis' of American Puritanism; it was his 'flood subject,' exercising a tyranny that bent the mind and baffled choice." And as a writer of fiction, "Hawthorne had a nearly flawless sense of the way some text always comes between the observer and the origins he would observe, making the historian's own tale twice-told at its very most original."

Critical reception

Historian David Levin says, "Mr. Colacurcio's massive study, more powerfully than any other single work I know, advances our understanding of Hawthorne's development and practice as a historical writer," adding: "Whether or not we can read Hawthorne intelligently or profitably without knowing the history of colonial New England, Mr. Colacurcio proves that we will read Hawthorne more intelligently if we take the trouble to see the range and depth of his historical judgment." Literary critic Merton Sealts, Jr. notes that "The Province of Piety has significant interdisciplinary implications," and that, "future critics of Hawthorne cannot ignore the impressive argument of this book."

Other works

Colacurcio's Doctrine and Difference is a collection of writings that demonstrate the lasting influence of Puritan orthodoxy in the New England literary tradition, with essays on Jonathan Edwards, Ralph Waldo Emerson, Emily Dickinson, and others.

His book, Godly Letters, a study of the Puritan tradition in American literature, is described by a reviewer in The New England Quarterly as "an illuminating and deeply searching compendium that embodies the culmination of a lifelong career in research and teaching."

In 2015, a festschrift titled A Passion for Getting It Right: Essays and Appreciations in Honor of Michael J. Colacurcio’s 50 Years of Teaching was published in Colacurcio's honor. It includes contributions from former students and colleagues such as Andrew Delbanco and Eric J. Sundquist.

Colacurcio's most recent book is the magisterial two-volume Emerson and Other Minds (Baylor University Press, 2020–21).

=== Honors ===
Colacurcio is the recipient of several distinguished teaching awards from both Cornell University and UCLA.

In 2007, he was elected to the American Academy of Arts and Sciences in recognition of his contributions to his field.

== Additional Information ==
Michael J. Colacurcio has supervised the doctoral dissertations of numerous individuals including Lauren Berlant and David Van Leer.

== Bibliography ==
- The Province of Piety: Moral History in Hawthorne's Early Tales. Harvard University Press, Cambridge, Mass. 1984. ISBN 0674719573
  - Paperback: Duke University Press, Durham NC 1995. ISBN 0822315726
- (Editor): New Essays on "The Scarlet Letter". Cambridge University Press, Cambridge 1985. ISBN 0521319986
- Doctrine and Difference: Essays in the Literature of New England. Routledge, New York and London 1997. ISBN 0415912385
- Godly Letters: The Literature of the American Puritans. University of Notre Dame Press, Notre Dame IN 2006. ISBN 0268022909
- A Passion for Getting It Right: Essays and Appreciations in Honor of Michael J. Colacurcio’s 50 Years of Teaching. Peter Lang, 2015. ISBN 1433128934
- Emerson and Other Minds: Volume 1, Idealism and the Moral Self. Baylor University Press, 2020. ISBN 9781481311779
- Emerson and Other Minds: Volume 2, Idealism and the Lonely Subject. Baylor University Press, 2021. ISBN 9781481311793
