= Groupe F =

Groupe F is a production company specialised in the design and performance of live shows and pyrotechnic events. It operates on five continents.

== History ==
Founded in 1990 in Bessèges (Gard, F) by François Montel, Alain Burkhalter and Didier Mandin, Groupe F takes off internationally in 1992 with the arrival of Éric Noel, Nicolas Mousques, Caroline and Christophe Berthonneau, designing the pyrotechnic effects of the Barcelona Summer Olympics closing ceremony. In 1993, Groupe F goes on a world tour with its show "Oiseaux de Feu" (Birds of Fire), followed by "Un peu plus de Lumière" and also performs the closing fireworks of the 1998 FIFA World Cup.

On 31 December 1999, Groupe F stages the pyrotechnic show on the Eiffel Tower celebrating the transition to the year 2000. Building on the worldwide success of the event, the group recruits a multidisciplinary team for the artistic and technical implementation of its major projects. Jonas Bidaut, Cédric Moreau, Eric Travers and Jeff Yelnik have supported the international development of Groupe F ever since.

In 2000, Groupe F starts exploring new scenographic territories and creates tools for monumental shows, combining light, video mapping, music, fire and human performers. The Palace of Versailles, the Pont du Gard and the Eiffel Tower host these new creations on several occasions.

In November 2017, the Ministry of Culture entrust the company with the opening show of the Louvre Abu Dhabi.

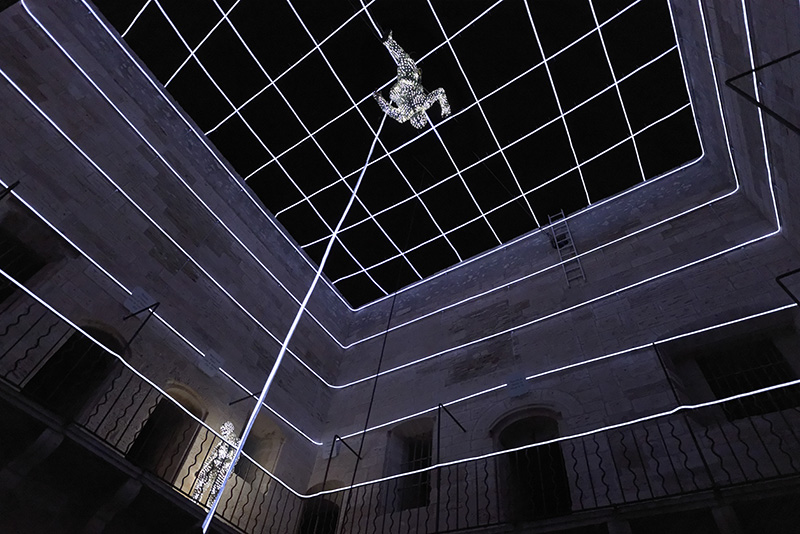
Migrations, chateau d'if. 2012

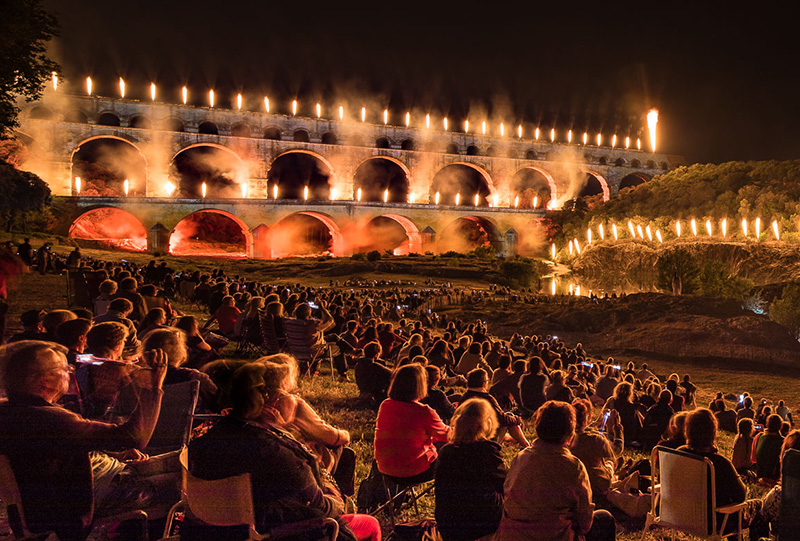
Feux Romains, Pont du Gard. 2017

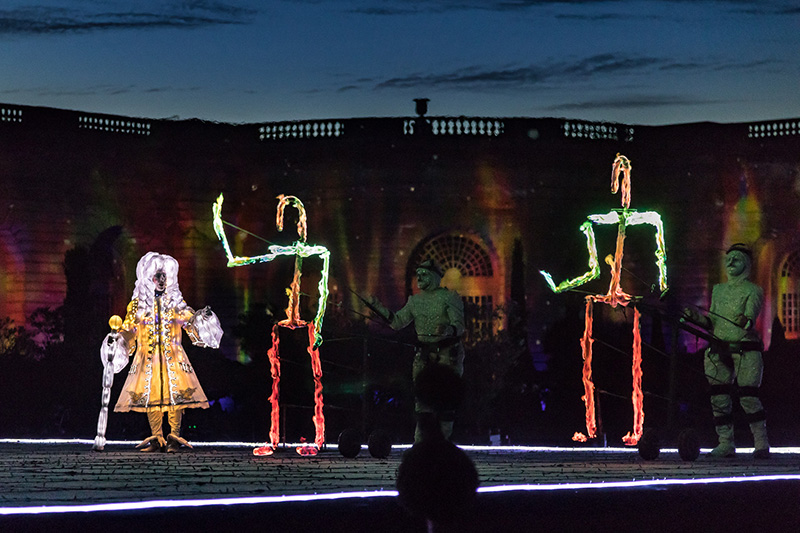
Le Roi de Feu, chateau de Versailles. 2017

== Main live shows ==
- Les Oiseaux de Feu (on tour from 1994 to 2000)
- Un peu plus de Lumière (on tour from 1997 to 2010)
- Joueurs de Lumière (on tour from 2004 to 2010)
- Coups de Foudre (on tour from 2008 to 2010)
- Versailles : La Face cachée du Soleil (2007 and 2008)
- L'Autre Monde, Les États et Empires du Soleil (2009)
- Les Noces Royales de Louis XIV (2010)
- Le Roi de Feu (2015, 2016, 2017)
- "Migrations" series (since 2012)
- Rhône, in Arles, for the launch of Marseille Provence, European Capital of Culture 2013
- Focus – La Saga des Photons, for the launch of Dunkirk Regional Capital of Culture 2013
- À Fleur de Peau (on tour since 2014)
- At the Pont du Gard : Lux Populi (2008), Impressions (2011), Ludolux (2012), Ulysse au pays des merveilles (2013), Le Magicien d'eau (2014), Les Mondes Magiques (2015), Feux Gaulois (2016), Feux Romains (2017)
- Suspended time, original creation for the 50th anniversary of the Beatles album Sgt. Pepper's Lonely Hearts Club Band at the Sgt Pepper at 50 festival in Liverpool, 2017
- Vives réflexions, inauguration show of Louvre Abu Dhabi, 2017

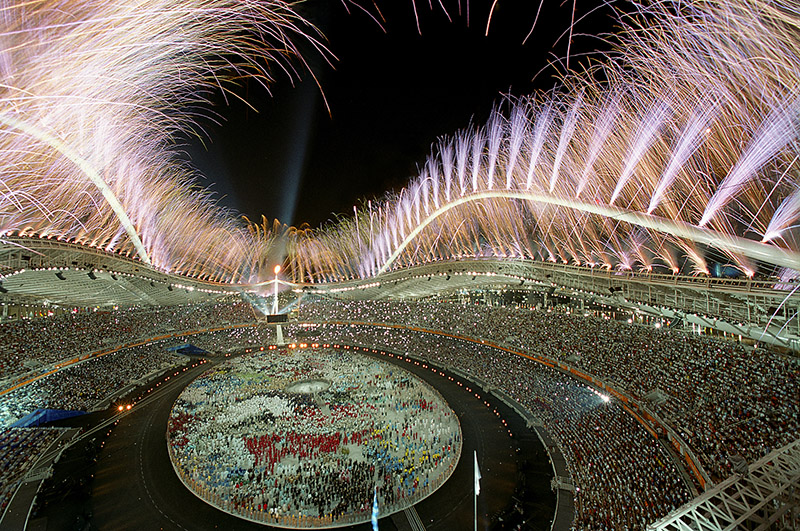
Athens Olympic Games opening ceremony, 2004

== Main pyrotechnics events ==
- Closing of the Barcelona Summer Olympics, 1992
- Closing of the 1998 FIFA World Cup
- Transition to the year 2000 on the Eiffel Tower
- Opening and closing of the 2004 Athens Summer Olympics and Paralympics
- Inauguration of the Patras bridge, 2004
- Closing of the Universal Forum of Cultures in Barcelona, 2004
- New Year in London on the London Eye, 2004 to 2009
- 2007: Inauguration of the new TGV Est line
- Opening and closing of the 2006 Winter Olympics and Paralympics in Turin
- Inauguration of the Museum of Islamic Art, Doha, 2008
- Opening of the Jeff Koons exhibition at the Palace of Versailles, 2008
- Johnny Hallyday's Tour 66
- Inauguration of the Burj Khalifa 2010
- Opening and closing of the 2011 AFC Asian Cup in Doha
- New Year on Taipei 101, Taiwan, 2012–2015
- Pyrotechnic design for Cai Guo-Qiang's "One Night Stand" at the 2013 Paris Nuit Blanche
- Fireworks on the Eiffel Tower on Bastille Day 2004, 2009, 2014, 2015, 2016, 2018, 2020
- Opening and closing ceremonies of the 2016 Summer Olympics and Paralympics in Rio
- Inauguration of the Lotte World Tower in Seoul, South Korea, 2017

== Visual identity ==
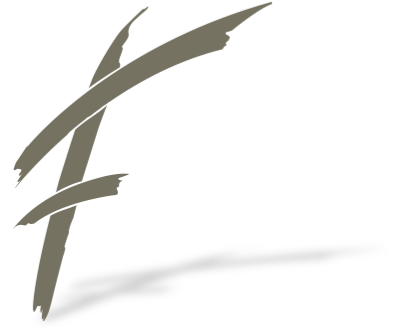
2017–present
