= Romeo Castellucci =

Italian theatre director

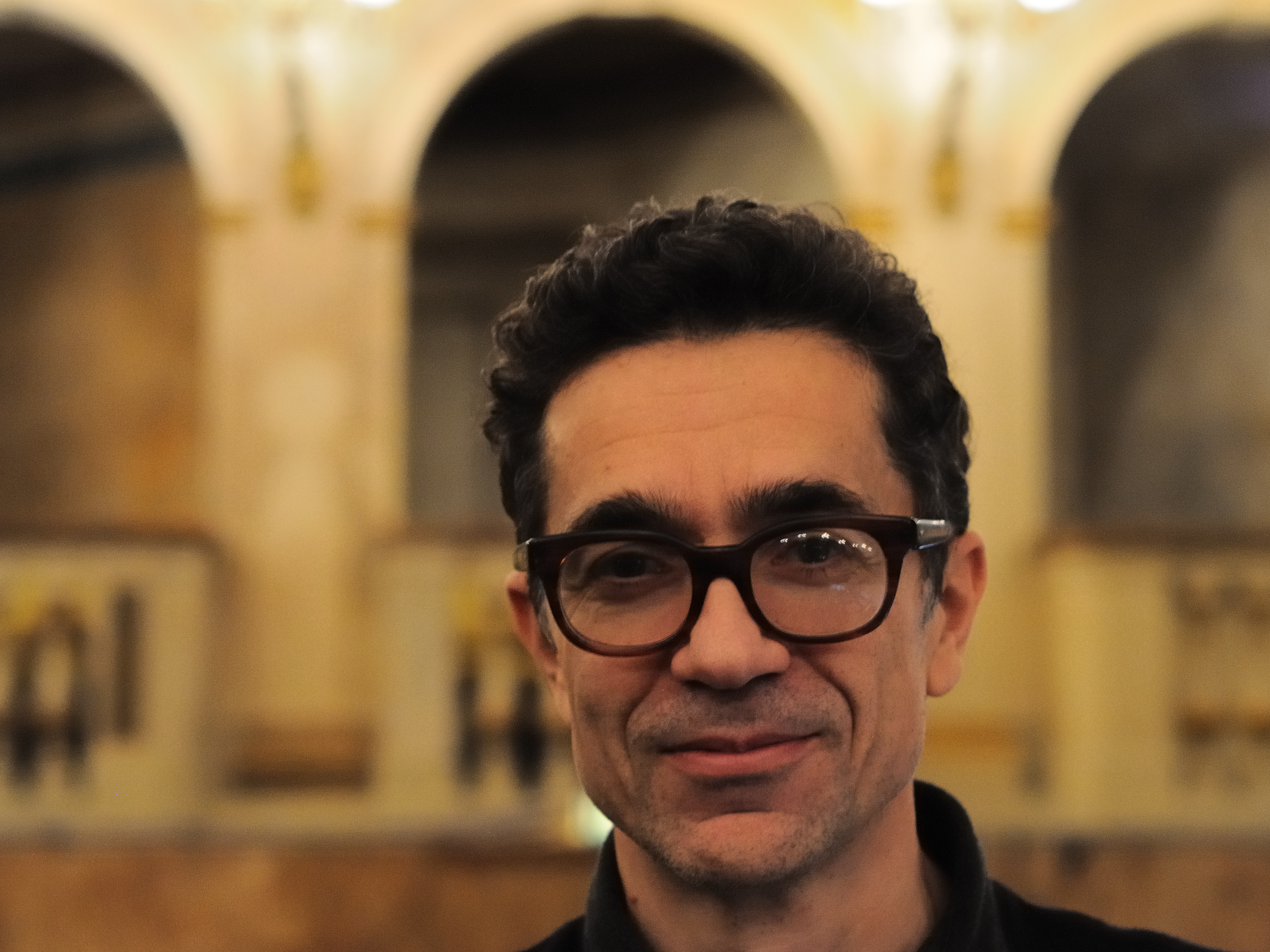
- Born: August 4, 1960 (age 66); Cesena, Italy
- Occupations: Theatre director, playwright, artist, designer
- Writing career
- Period: 1981–present

Romeo Castellucci (born August 4, 1960) is an Italian theatre director, playwright, artist and designer. Since the 1980s he has been one part of the European theatrical avant-garde.

== Biography ==
Romeo Castellucci graduated with a degree in painting and stage design from the Accademia di Belle Arti di Bologna. In 1981, jointly with Claudia Castellucci and Chiara Guidi, he founded Socìetas Raffaello Sanzio.

Since then he has produced numerous plays as an author, director and a designer of sets, lighting, sound and costumes. His works, which combine multiple arts to achieve a holistic effect, have been presented in more than 50 countries. Castellucci’s dramatic lines challenge the primacy of literature. His theatre is a visual, complex art rich in vision. He has developed a language that is comprehensible in the same way as music, sculpture, painting and architecture can be.

Since 2006, Castellucci has been working individually. His productions are regularly invited to the world’s most prestigious theatres, opera houses and festivals.

Romeo Castellucci has released more than a dozen books and has received numerous awards and recognitions, including:

- Europe Prize Theatrical Realities, with Chiara Guidi, awarded to Socìetas Raffaello Sanzio (Taormina, 2000)
- Best Opera Director (Opernwelt magazine, 2014)
- The Golden Lion for Lifetime Achievement (La Biennale Teatro di Venezia; 2013)
- Honoris Causa (Università di Bologna, 2014)
- Knight of the Order of Arts and Letters by the Ministry of Culture of the French Republic (2002)
- Prize for Best International Production for Genesi. From the Museum of Sleep (Dublin Theatre Festival, 2000)
- Ubu Prize (1997, 2000, 2004, and 2006 with special distinction).
- Masque d’Or Prize for best foreign play for Orestea (una commedia organica?)(Festival Theatre des Ameriques in Canada, 1996).

In 2003 he became director of the theatre section of the 37th edition of the Venice Biennale, and in 2008 he was one of two "associate artists" at the Festival d'Avignon, and created three pieces inspired by Dante's Divine Comedy.

On 2 August 2013, he was awarded the Golden Lion for Lifetime Achievement by the Venice Biennale (Theatre Section) with the following motivation: 'For his ability to create a new theatrical language that blends theatre, music and the plastic arts. For creating worlds in which the excellence of the representation of dreamlike states is achieved, which is perhaps the most beautiful affirmation that can be made of theatre. For staging a representation of something impossible to represent, such as a nightmare."

His work is still regularly invited and produced by the most prestigious prose theatres, opera houses and international festivals in over fifty countries covering all continents.

For the three-year period 2021-2024, he is artist-in-residence as ‘Grand Invité’ of Triennale Milano.

In the field of opera, in the two-year period 2023-2024, he will work on Richard Wagner's Der Ring des Nibelungen for La Monnaie in Brussels and the Liceu Theatre in Barcelona.

In March 2024, he created Bérénice, a monologue loosely based on Jean Racine, with Isabelle Huppert.

In 2025, he made his debut at the Venice Biennale with I mangiatori di patate (The Potato Eaters), a performance staged on the island of Lazzaretto Vecchio, and in Geneva with a version of Pergolesi's Stabat Mater, performed by Barbara Hannigan and Jacub Josef Orlinski.

In 2026, he will appear for the first time at La Scala in Milan with Pelléas et Mélisande.

== Stage works ==
- Cenno (1981)
- Diade incontro a monade (1981)
- Persia-Mondo (1981)
- Popolo Zuppo (1982)
- I fuoriclasse della bontà (1983)
- Oratoria n.1: Rimpatriata Artistica (1983)
- Oratoria n.2. Raptus (1984)
- Oratoria n.3: Interferon (1984)
- Kaputt necropolis (1984)
- Glory glory, alleluja (1985)
- Santa Sofia. Teatro Khmer (1986)
- Oratoria n.4: Tohu Wa Bohu (Apparenze pre-mondiali) (1986)
- I Miserabili (1987)
- Oratoria n.5: Sono consapevole dell’odio che tu nutri per me (1987)
- Alla bellezza tanto antica (1988)
- Il gran reame dell’adolescenza [La cripta degli adolescenti, L’adolescente sulla torre d’avorio, Oratoria n.5.: Sono consapevole dell’odio che tu nutri per me] (1988)
- La discesa di Inanna (1989)
- Gilgamesh (1990)
- Iside e Osiride (1990)
- Ahura Mazda (1991)
- Amleto. La veemente esteriorità della morte di un mollusco (1992)
- Le favole di Esopo (1992)
- Masoch. I trionfi del teatro come potenza passiva, colpa e sconfitta (1993)
- Hansel e Gretel (1993)
- Lucifero. Quanto più una parola è vecchia tanto più va a fondo (1993)
- Oratoria n.6: con evidenza per coloro che intendono (1993)
- Persona (1994)
- Festa plebea con Oratoria n.7: anche il peggiore può parlare, ma non deve farlo per me (1994)
- Le fatiche di Ercole (1994)
- Orestea (una commedia organica?) (1995)
- Buchettino (1995)
- Pelle d'asino (1996)
- Giulio Cesare (1997)
- Ophelia (1997)
- La prova di un altro mondo (1998)
- Genesi. From the Museum of Sleep (1999)
- Voyage au bout de la nuit (1999)
- Il Combattimento dai Madrigali guerrieri et amorosi, Libro VIII (2000)
- Tragedia Endogonidia [C.#01 CESENA, A.#02 AVIGNON, B.#03 BERLIN, BR.#04 BRUXELLES/BRUSSEL, BN.#05 BERGEN, P.#06 PARIS, R.#07 ROMA, S.#08 STRASBOURG, L.#09 LONDON, M.#10 MARSEILLE, C.#11 CESENA] (2002-2004)
- Crescite [Dal Ciclo della TRAGEDIA ENDOGONIDIA] (2002-2004)
- Cryonic Chants (2004)
- Hey Girl! (2007)
- Divina Commedia: Inferno, Purgatorio, Paradiso (2008)
- Storia contemporanea dell'Africa. Vol. III (2008)
- Io penso (2010)
- Sul concetto di volto nel figlio di Dio (2010)
- Parsifal (2011)
- Il velo nero di pastore (2011)
- Persona (2011)
- Attore, il tuo nome non è esatto (2011)
- The Phenomenon Called I (2011)
- The Four Seasons Restaurant (2012)
- DAMMERUNG e NOTHUNG (2012)
- Folk (2012)
- Hyperion. Letters of a Terrorist (2013)
- Schwanengesang D744 - Canto del Cigno (2013)
- Natura e origine della mente (2013)
- Orphee et Eurydice (2014)
- The Rite of Spring (2014)
- Neither (2014)
- Ödipus der Tyrann de Friedrich Hölderlin, d’après Sophocle (2015)
- Moses and Aron (2015)
- St. Matthew Passion (2016)
- Democracy in America
- Tannhäuser (2017)
- Salome (2018)
- The Magic Flute (2018)
- Il Primo Omicidio (2019)
- Requiem (2019)
- Don Giovanni (2021)
- Bros (2021)
- Bluebeard's Castle by Béla Bartók (2022)
- Resurrection (2022)
- De Temporum Fine Comoedia by Carl Orff (2022)
- domani (performance, 2022)
- Daphne by Richard Strauss (2023)
- Senza Titolo (performance, 2023)
- Ma (2023) (movie 2026)
- De Walküre by Richard Wagner (2024)
- Bérénice (2024)
- Le Lacrime di Eros (2024)
- Stabat Mater by Giovanni Battista Pergolesi (2025)
- I mangiatori di patate (2025)
- Pelléas and Mélisande (2026)
- Saint François d'Assise (2026)

== Discography ==
- Il Terzo Reich – co-author Scott Gibbons (2022, LP, Xong collection, Xing, Italy)

== Bibliography ==
- Colusso Tiziana, Società Raffaello Sanzio: Il Teatro Iconoclasta, Ravenna: Essegi, 1989.
- Castellucci Claudia & Castellucci Romeo, Il teatro della Socìetas Raffaello Sanzio. Del teatro iconoplasta alla super-icona, Milano: Ubulibri, 1992.
- Castellucci Claudia & Castellucci Romeo, Les Pèlerins de la matière. Théorie et praxis du théâtre. Écrits de la Socìetas Raffaello Sanzio, Besançon: Les solitaires intempestifs, 2001.
- Castellucci Romeo & Guidi Chiara & Castellucci Claudia, Epopea della polvere. Il teatro della Socìetas Raffaello Sanzio 1992-1999: Amleto, Masoch, Orestea, Giulio Cesare, Genesi, Milano: Ubulibri, 2001.
- Castellucci Romeo & Socìetas Raffaello Sanzio, Epitaph, Besançon: Les solitaires intempestifs, 2003.
- Tackels Bruno, Les Castellucci, Besançon: Les solitaires intempestifs, 2005.
- Castellucci Claudia & Castellucci Romeo & Guidi Chiara & Kelleher Joe & Ridout Nicholas, The Theatre of Socìetas Raffaello Sanzio, London: Routledge, 2007.
- Pitozzi Enrico & Sacchi Annalisa, Itinera: Trajectoires de la forme. Tragedia Endogonidia, Arles: Actes Sud, 2008.
- Papalexiou Elena, Romeo Castellucci, Socìetas Raffaello Sanzio: When Words turn to Matter, Athens: Plethron, 2009.
- Papalexiou Eleni, “Ecce Homo”, in Theater der Zeit, Berlin, Januar 2011.
- Papalexiou Eleni, “The body as dramatic material in the theatre of Romeo Castellucci”, in Prospero European Review. Theatre and Research, 2, 2011.
- Papalexiou Eleni, "Le corps comme matière dramatique dans le théâtre de Romeo Castellucci", in Utopie et pensée critique dans le processus de création, Besançon: Les Solitaires Intempestifs, 2012.
- Semenowicz Dorota, To nie jest obraz, Poznan: Fundacja Malta / Koproracja Ha!Art, 2013.
- Sacchi Annalisa, "Shakespeare per la Socìetas Raffaello Sanzio", Pisa, ETS, 2014.
- Dukanic Filip, L'esthétique de la disparition sur la scène contemporaine : Castellucci, Goebbels, Ikeda, doctoral dissertation, supervised by Joseph Danan and Jean-Marc Larrue, forthcoming in 2017. (in French)
- Di Matteo Piersandra (ed.),Toccare il reale. L’arte di Romeo Castellucci, Napoli: Cronopio, 2015. (ISBN 8898367139)
- Leifeld Denis, Performances zur Sprache bringen. Zur Aufführungsanalyse von Performern in Theater und Kunst, transcript, Bielefeld 2015. (in German; ISBN 978-3-8376-2805-0)
- Papalexiou Eleni, “The Dramaturgies of the Gaze: Strategies of Vision and Optical Revelations in the Theatre of Romeo Castellucci and the Socìetas Raffaello Sanzio”, in G. Rodosthenous (ed.), Theatre as Voyeurism. The pleasures of Watching, London: Palgrave-Macmillan, 2015.
- Papalexiou Eleni, “Nyx Teleia. Nella notte profonda del mondo greco antico”, in Piersandra Di Matteo (ed.), Toccare il reale. L’arte di Romeo Castellucci, Napoli: Cronopio, 2015.
- Kelleher Joe, The Illuminated Theatre: Studies on the Suffering of Images, London: Routledge, 2015.
- Papalexiou Eleni, “Romeo Castellucci, Go down, Moses”, in Peak Performances, Montclair State University, 9-12 June 2016.
- Figueira João Francisco, Laissez-vous toucher… A portrait by Romeo Castellucci, Lisbon, KKYM, 2018. (paper ISBN 978-989-54070-0-2; ebook ISBN 978-989-54070-2-6)
- Papalexiou Eleni, ‘Romeo Castellucci or the Visionary of the non-Visual’, in: The Great European Stage Directors, L. Van den Dries & T. de Laet (eds), London: Bloomsbury-Methuen, 2019, pp 87-117 & 204-212
