= Isaac Bissell =

American patriot post rider (1749 – 1822)

- Born: January 25, 1749; Windsor, Connecticut Colony, British America
- Died: July 28, 1822 (aged 73); Connecticut
- Resting place: Old Center Cemetery in Suffield, Connecticut
- Other names: Isaac Bissell Sr.
- Occupation(s): Post rider, colonial militia officer
- Spouse: Amelia Leavitt (m. 1776; died 1809)

Isaac Bissell (January 25, 1749 – July 28, 1822) was a patriot post rider who delivered mail between Boston and Hartford, Connecticut. On April 19, 1775, the British made an attack on Lexington and Concord, igniting the American Revolutionary War. He was assigned to alert American colonists of the news and rally them to assist the Massachusetts minutemen. Traveling from Watertown, Massachusetts, on the Upper Post Road to Hartford, Connecticut, and through Connecticut Colony, he carried the Lexington Alarm message from Joseph Palmer. He rode again in July 1779 to deliver the New Haven Alarm. Bissell served the Connecticut Militia throughout the Revolutionary War.

== Early life ==
Isaac Bissell was born January 25, 1749, in Windsor, of the Connecticut Colony. His parents were Samuel and Mary Bissell, the daughter of Isaac Kibbe of Enfield, Connecticut. Isaac's father died September 18, 1759. From Burke's Distinguished Families of America, the first Bissell family member to arrive in the British colonies was Captain John Bissell. He arrived in the Plymouth Colony in 1628, and after twelve years, he settled in Windsor, Connecticut.

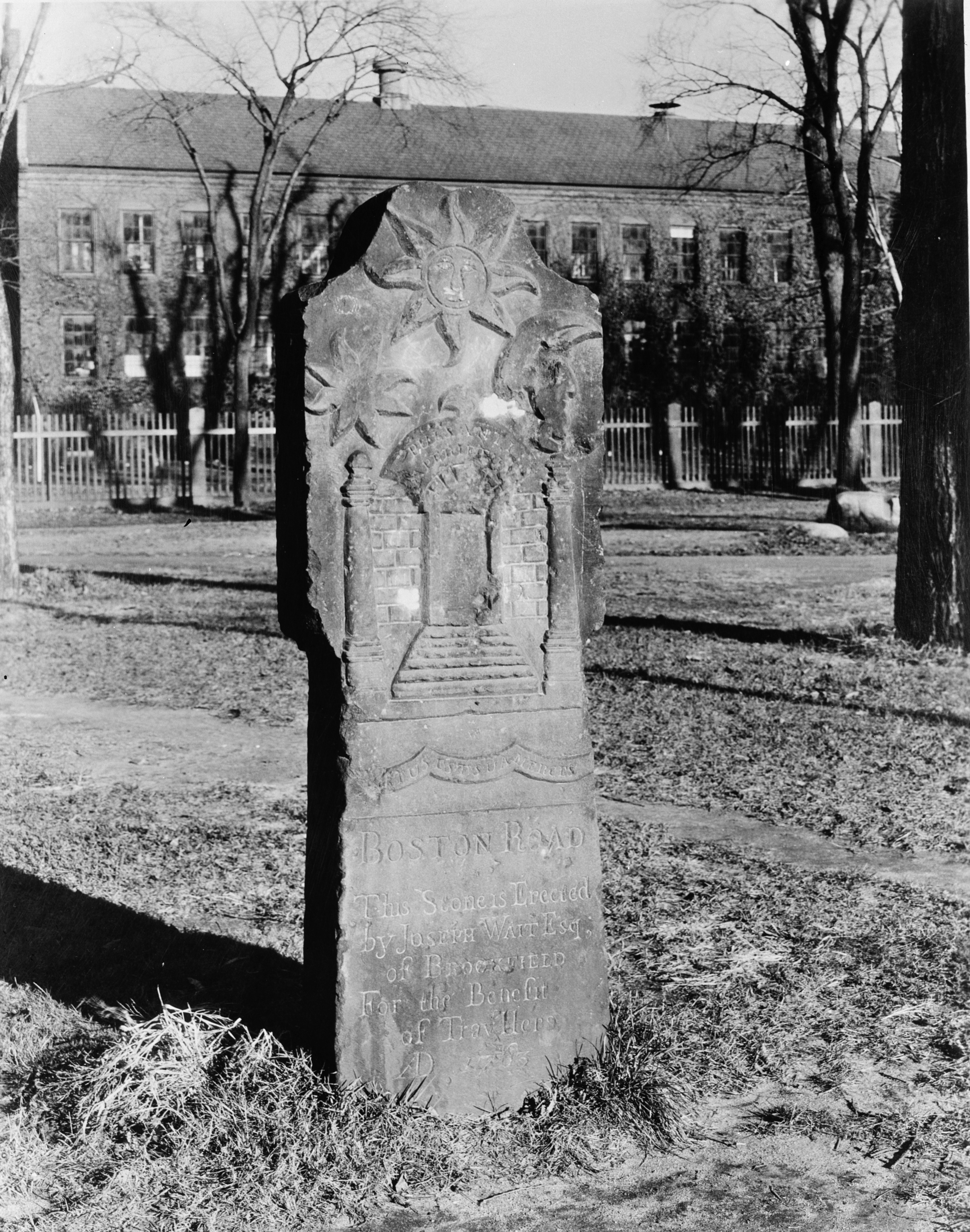
Boston Post Road milemarker at Springfield, Massachusetts

Bissell was a post rider who rode on horseback between Boston and Hartford, Connecticut Colony on the Upper Post Road, a mail delivery route. After Worcester, he stopped at Springfield, before going to Hartford in Connecticut.

== Lexington alarm ==
=== Dispatch ===
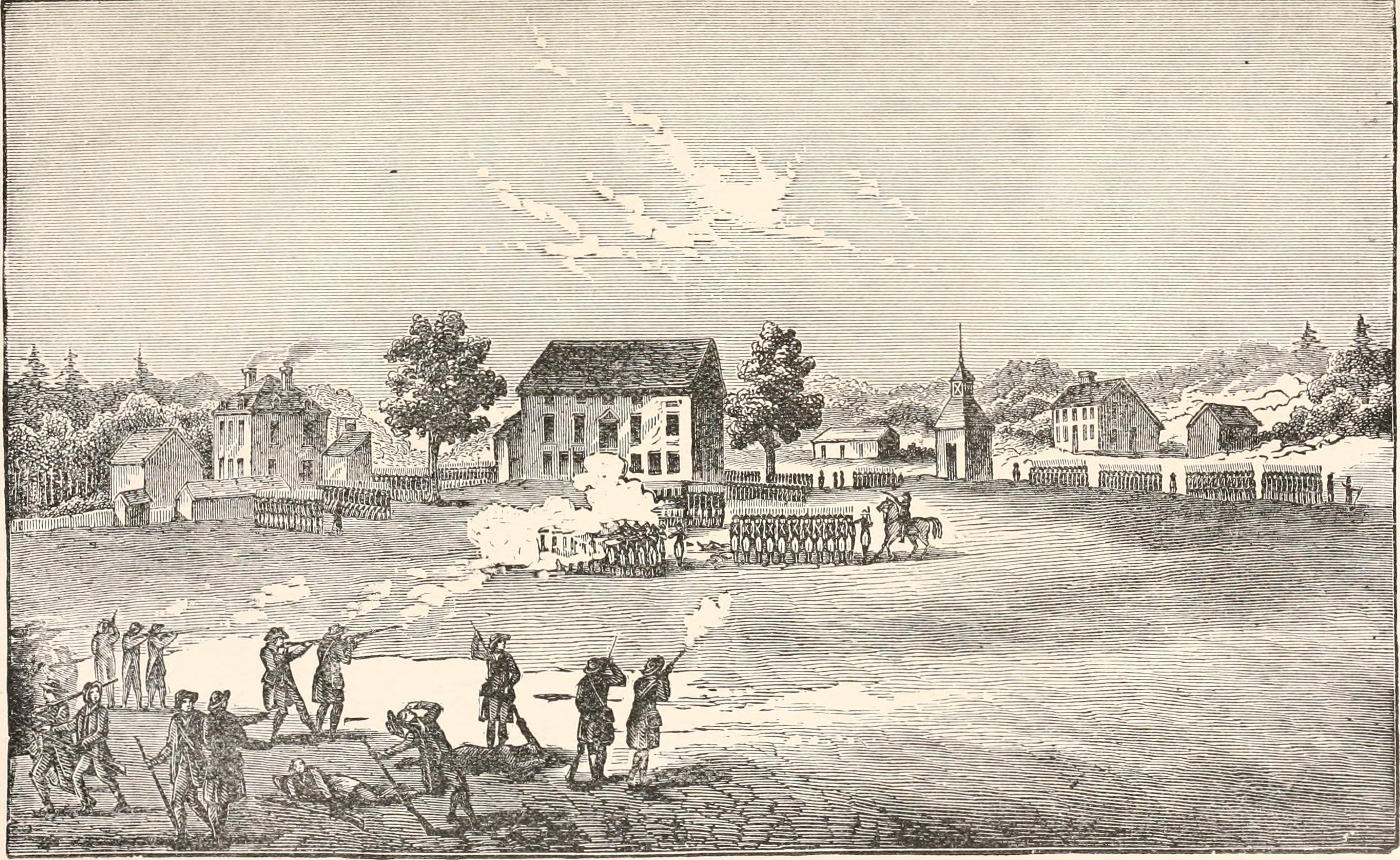
Elias Nason and George J. Varney, Battle of Lexington, April 19, 1775, A Gazetter of the state of Massachusetts, 1890

British soldiers opened the American Revolutionary War with the Siege of Boston and Battle of Lexington, when they marched from Boston to Lexington, outnumbering the patriot soldiers on April 19, 1775. That day, Joseph Palmer of the Committee of Safety met Isaac Bissell at the Lexington Green. (Note: Bissell said in a letter to Joseph Palmer that they had met at Lexington. Bissel wrote, "Sir you may Remember when Lexington Fite was you gave me an Express to Cary to Hartford in Connecticut which I did".) He sent Isaac Bissell on a ride to and through Connecticut to warn people that the war with Britain had begun. (Note: Isaac Bissell was to be paid 2 pounds and 1 shilling and given a certificate to alarm colonists in Hartford and then throughout Connecticut of the British invasion for a total of six days, as discussed at the Committee of Safety on July 7, 1775. The payment was officially ordered on April 23, 1776, by the Massachusetts House of Representatives when Col. Palmer, who had given the original message, verified the rider's identity as Isaac Bissell and petitioned the government on his behalf. In his correspondence about the payment, Bissell identified himself as Isaac Bissell of Suffield.)

Other post riders carried the message throughout a network of mail routes in Massachusetts, Connecticut, Rhode Island, and New Hampshire. Post riders rode through bad weather, poor road conditions, and moonless nights, which controlled whether they were able to travel three or four miles an hour. The purpose of the call to arms was to have militias in five colonies rally to support the minutemen of the Massachusetts militia.

The copy of the dispatch at Springfield, Massachusetts, states:

Watertown, Wednesday Morning, 10 o’clock,

To all the friends of American liberties be it known that this morning before break of day a brigade consisting of about 1000 or 1200 men landed at Phips' farm in Cambridge and marched to Lexington where they found a company of our colony militia in arms; upon them they fired without any provocation and killed six and wounded four others. By an express this moment from Boston we find another brigade are now on the march from Boston purported to be about 1000, the bearer Isaac Bissell is charged to alarm the country quite to Conn. and all persons are desired to furnish him with such horses as they may be needed. I have spoke to several persons who have seen the dead and wounded. Pray let the delegates from this colony to see this.

— Z. [sic] Palmer

One of the C'm' of Say, Col. Foster is one of the delegates (Note: There is no mention in the source of attestations from Worcester or any other stops before Springfield.)

Bissell first rode to Marlborough, Massachusetts, and his next stop was to Worcester on the Upper Post Road in the afternoon, where his horse (or Israel Bissell's horse) fell dead due from exhaustion outside the town meetinghouse. The town clerk, Nathan Baldwin, made copies of the dispatch. (Note: According to Borneman, some believe incorrectly that Bissell veered from his usual route. This could have been because there were two Bissells riding from Worcester. Isaac went west. Israel went south.) From Worcester, another rider carried the alarm south to Brooklyn, while Isaac Bissell traveled west on the Upper Post Road on the morning of April 20. Bissell continued on to Springfield, where the dispatch was recorded with the names of 61 townsmen, and then to Hartford. On April 20, 1775, armed companies of men from Springfield, West Springfield, and Suffield began their march for Boston. Other riders spread the message to other towns from each of his stops.

The six-day journey throughout Connecticut required Bissell to obtain fresh horses along the route. In Connecticut, the message reached 48 towns and 4,000 men answered the call to arms. Within a few hours of receiving the dispatch, men from the towns that Bissell stopped at were ready to march to Boston.

=== Timeline ===
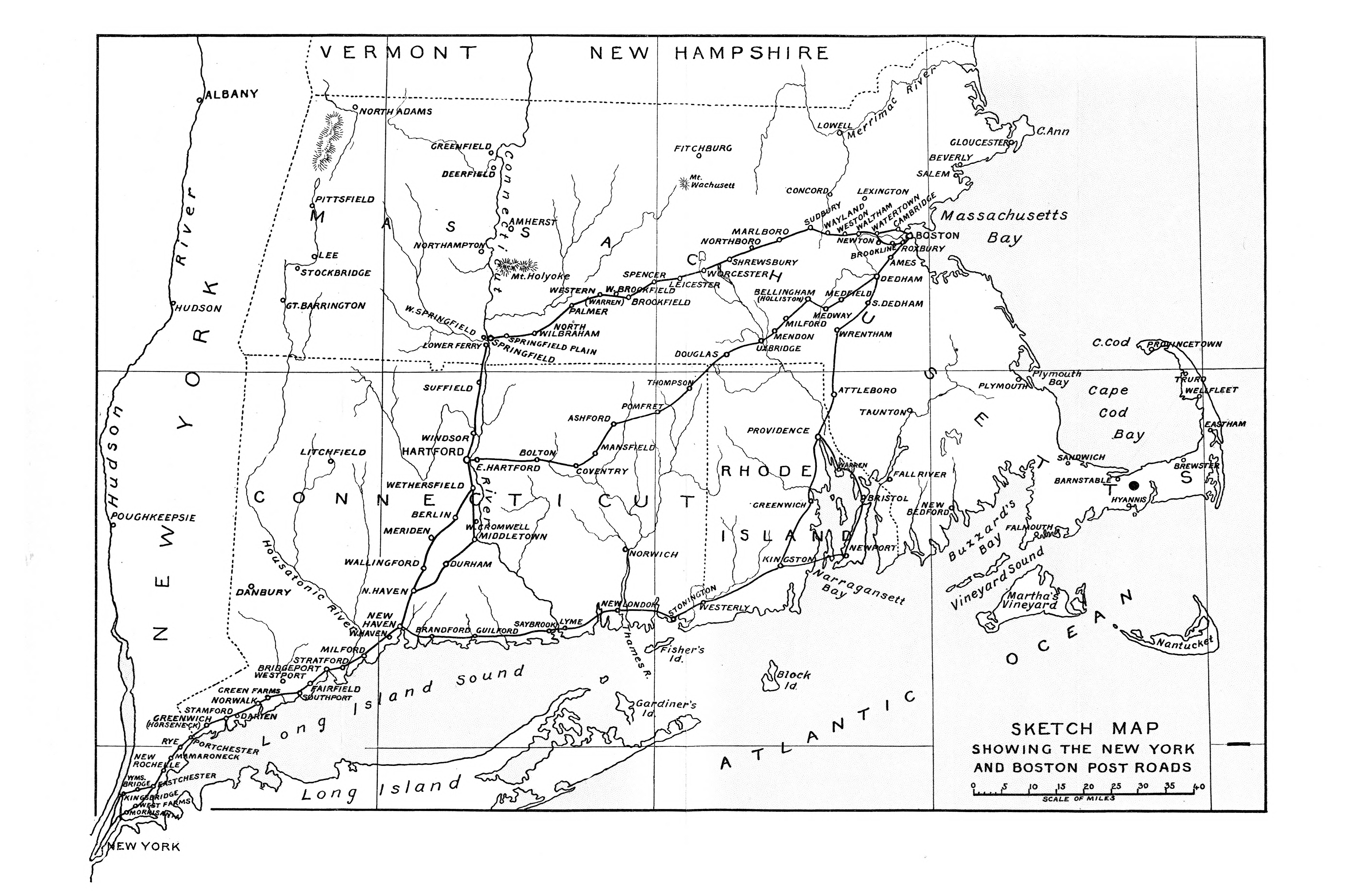
Map of Boston Post Roads, showing the Boston and New York roads, 1914

Isaac Bissell traveled 3 to 4 miles (4.8 to 6.4 km) per hour across his route. The speed varied depending upon whether he was traveling on a moonless night or in inclement weather.

- Lexington Green, April 19 or Watertown, Massachusetts
- Marlborough, Massachusetts, April 19
- Worcester, Massachusetts, arrived April 19 afternoon (Note: The town clerk, Nathan Baldwin, took the dispatch, made copies, and attested to its message.) and traveled west the morning of April 20
- Springfield, Massachusetts, a copy of the dispatch at Springfield shows that Isaac Bissell was the bearer of the message. It is worded similarly to the dispatch delivered by Israel Bissell.
- Hartford, Connecticut
- Wethersfield, Connecticut, John Silas

General Joseph Hawley stated the Bissell's role was important to rally soldiers for the battles in Concord and Lexington. Shortly after townspeople got the word that the war had begun, people headed for the battle, either individually or as members of three companies.

=== Two post riders named Bissell ===
Isaac Bissell took a westerly route in Massachusetts, from Worcester, down to Hartford, and then throughout the Connecticut countryside for a total of six days. The dispatch that Isaac carried to Springfield identifies him as the bearer.

Israel Bissell, sometimes confused with Isaac, was a postrider who spread the Lexington Alarm south through Connecticut, reportedly to Philadelphia. (Note: Historian Lion G. Miles states that Bissell rode only as far as Hartford, Connecticut. The notice in the broadsheet mentions Bissell riding throughout Connecticut and does not mention Philadelphia.) Israel Bissell's normal mail route was from Boston to New York. (Note: McKenna states that there are no vital records about Israel Bissell or records that he delivered messages about the Lexington Alarm. The Israel Bissell article documents his early life, father and brother, that Elias Boudinot wrote in his diary that he had met Israel Bissell in Elizabethtown, New Jersey, and he was a post rider for the British, and then for the patriots.) The dispatch carried by Israel Bissell through Connecticut and to New York identified him as the bearer. The copy of the call to arms that arrived in Philadelphia identified the bearer as Trail Bisel or Bisiel.

== Revolutionary War ==
At the time that the war broke out, Bissell was living in Suffield, Connecticut.

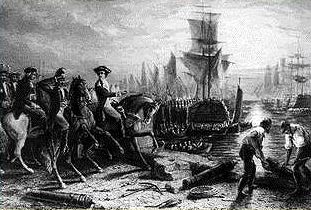
J. Godfrey, after a painting by Michael Angelo Wageman, British evacuation of Boston, March 17, 1776, at the end of the Siege of Boston, engraving, ca. 1861

Bissell made two rides as a call to arms. The first time was the Lexington Alarm of April 19, 1775. He sounded the New Haven Alarm in July 1779. Bissell served in the Connecticut Militia during the war. He first served as a private in Captain Elihu Kent's Company of the Suffield, Connecticut Militia. In 1776, he served as a sergeant in Captain Harmon's Company of Colonel Erastus Wolcott's Regiment, participating in the Siege of Boston (April 19, 1775 – March 17, 1776). After the Siege of Boston, Bissell did not serve again until the British attacked Connecticut in 1779, when he served in Captain Simeon Sheldon's Company.

== Personal life ==
Bissell married Amelia Leavitt on July 4, 1776. Born December 12, 1757, she was the daughter of Captain John Leavitt. They had sons Isaac and Horace, or Asaph. After the war, Bissell worked as a blacksmith in Suffield. He operated the business at his six-acre property, with the house called the Timothy Swan House. He sold the property in April 1788. Amelia died November 15, 1809, and was buried in Hanover, New Hampshire. Bissell died on July 28, 1822, and was buried at the Old Center Cemetery in Suffield, Connecticut. A Revolutionary War marker resides at his grave.

One of his grandsons is George Bissell.

== See also ==
Midnight ride on April 18, 1775

- Paul Revere
- William Dawes
- Samuel Prescott

Danbury, Connecticut ride of April 26, 1777

- Sybil Ludington

== Bibliography ==
- Borneman, Walter R. (2014). American spring : Lexington, Concord, and the road to revolution. New York: Little, Brown and Company. ISBN 978-0-316-22102-3.
- Copeland, Alfred Minott (1902). "Our county and its people" : A history of Hampden County, Massachusetts. Boston: Century Memorial Publishing Company.
- Johnston, Henry Phelps (1889). Record of service of Connecticut men in the I. War of the Revolution, II. War of 1812, III. Mexican War. Connecticut. Adjutant-General's Office. Hartford, Connecticut: Case, Lockwood & Brainard Company.
- Philbrick, Nathaniel (2013). Bunker Hill. Wheeler Publishing. ISBN 978-1-4104-5778-3.
- Scheide, John H. (April 1940). "The Lexington Alarm" (PDF). American Antiquarian.
