= Horace Mann Jr. =

American botanist (1844–1868)

Horace Mann Jr
- Born: February 25, 1844; Boston, Massachusetts
- Died: November 11, 1868 (aged 24)
- Resting place: Burial Ground, Providence, Rhode Island
- Occupation: botanist
- Known for: study of Hawaiian flora; travels with Henry David Thoreau

Horace Mann Jr. (February 25, 1844 – November 11, 1868) was an American botanist, son of Horace Mann. His mother was one of the famous Peabody Sisters Mary Tyler Peabody Mann. Mentored in botany by Henry David Thoreau, whom he accompanied on an expedition to Minnesota, Mann took classes in zoology with Louis Agassiz and assisted William Tufts Brigham on a botanical survey of the Hawaiian Islands. Mann was to have headed the botanical garden at Harvard, but died of tuberculosis at age twenty-four. His own herbarium was purchased by Cornell University and became the basis of that university's collection. He is credited with the discovery of more than 100 species.

== Early years ==
Horace Mann Jr. was born in Boston on February 25, 1844. He was the eldest of three sons of education reformer Horace Mann and his second wife, Mary Tyler Peabody Mann, and the grandson of Nathaniel Peabody. Mann was educated by his parents, who believed in teaching through hands-on study, at home in West Newton, Massachusetts. In 1853, the family moved to Yellow Springs, Ohio, where the elder Horace Mann established Antioch College. Although not old enough for college enrollment when first they arrived, young Horace had an inquisitive mind and was exposed to state of the art scientific learning.

As a youth, Horace's interests ran to science, exploration and travel. After completing his first year of college at Antioch in 1859, Mann spent several weeks in the Boston home of Samuel Gridley and Julia Ward Howe.

Upon his father's death due to typhoid fever in 1859, the family returned to their mother's home-state of Massachusetts and the village of Concord, renting for a time the home of Mann's aunt and uncle, Nathaniel and Sophia Hawthorne, known as The Wayside.

== Education and scientific studies ==
In 1861, Mann accompanied Henry David Thoreau on a journey of exploration and discovery that took them to Minnesota, where it was believed the climate would benefit Thoreau's tuberculosis. Thoreau had been one of the young man's mentors in examination of the natural world. The pair left Concord, Massachusetts on May 11, 1861 and arrived at St. Paul on May 26. Thoreau's health continued to decline, however, and they returned to Concord on July 11.

That fall, Mann began studies at Lawrence Scientific School at Harvard College, taking lessons in zoology with Louis Agassiz. Mann studied and taught botany under Asa Gray. Gray was grooming Mann to replace him as Harvard's botany professor until Mann died.

In 1864, Horace Mann accompanied William Tufts Brigham on a botanical survey of the Hawaiian Islands, where they discovered more than 100 plant taxa new to science, including Cyanea lobata or the genera Platydesma and Alsinidendron. The Hawaiian fern Diellia mannii is named in Mann's honor. Mann graduated Harvard in 1867, writing his thesis on the topic of Hawaiian flora; titled Enumeratio of Hawaiian Plants, it was published in 1867.

== Death and legacy ==
It was Asa Gray's hope that Horace Mann become his successor at the botanical garden and in the botany department at Harvard University in 1868, but Mann died of tuberculosis on November 11, the same day that he was elected to the American Academy of Arts and Sciences. He left unfinished his Flora of the Hawaiian Islands. Mann's personal herbarium of ca.12,500 sheets was purchased in 1869 by Andrew Dickson White; it was the first accession into the Cornell University Herbarium and forms the original nucleus around which the Cornell University herbarium grew. In addition to Enumeratio of Hawaiian Plants, Horace Mann, Jr., wrote other works in regard to Hawaiian flora, including Flora of the Hawaiian Islands and Analysis of the Hawaiian Flora, which was finished by William Tufts Brigham and published after Mann's death.
