= Israel Bissell =

American patriot (1752–1823)

- Born: 1752; East Windsor, Connecticut, Connecticut Colony, British America
- Died: October 24, 1823 (aged 71); Hinsdale, Massachusetts, U.S.
- Other name: Israel Bissel
- Occupations: Post rider, colonial militia officer
- Spouse: Lucy Hancock (1784–1823; his death)
- Children: 4

Israel Bissell, also spelled Bissel (1752 – October 24, 1823), was a patriot post rider who delivered mail between Boston, Massachusetts and New York.

On April 19, 1775, British forces fired on colonists in Lexington and Concord, inciting the American Revolutionary War. Bissell was assigned to alert American colonists of the news and rally them to assist the Massachusetts minutemen. The Lexington Alarm message was carried by Bissell through eastern Massachusetts, Connecticut, New York City, New Jersey, and ultimately to Philadelphia, Pennsylvania.

The order stated that Bissell was to travel through Connecticut, which he did; traveling along the Old Post Road from Watertown, Massachusetts to New Haven; where the dispatch included an order to take the message to Philadelphia. In New York, General Alexander McDougall added an order to obtain a new rider to convey the message to Philadelphia. According to the Sons of the American Revolution and Elizabeth Norton Hunt, Bissell went the entire way to Philadelphia.

Along the way, Bissell shouted "To arms, to arms, the war has begun", and carried a message from Joseph Palmer asking townspeople to send soldiers to the fight. Benedict Arnold of New Haven, Israel Putnam of Pomfret, and others mustered soldiers and headed for the battlegrounds in Massachusetts.

== Early life ==
Israel Bissell was born in 1752 in East Windsor of the Connecticut Colony of the British Colonies. He was the son of Israel Bissell Sr. (Note: Phillip Mack Smith raises the question, was the rider Israel or Israel Sr.? Both fought in the war. Smith is the brother of Edward Church Smith, who wrote The History of Middlefield, Mass. The Israel Bissell of this article is referred to as a 23-year-old man at the time of the ride.) His family settled in East Windsor after they immigrated from England.

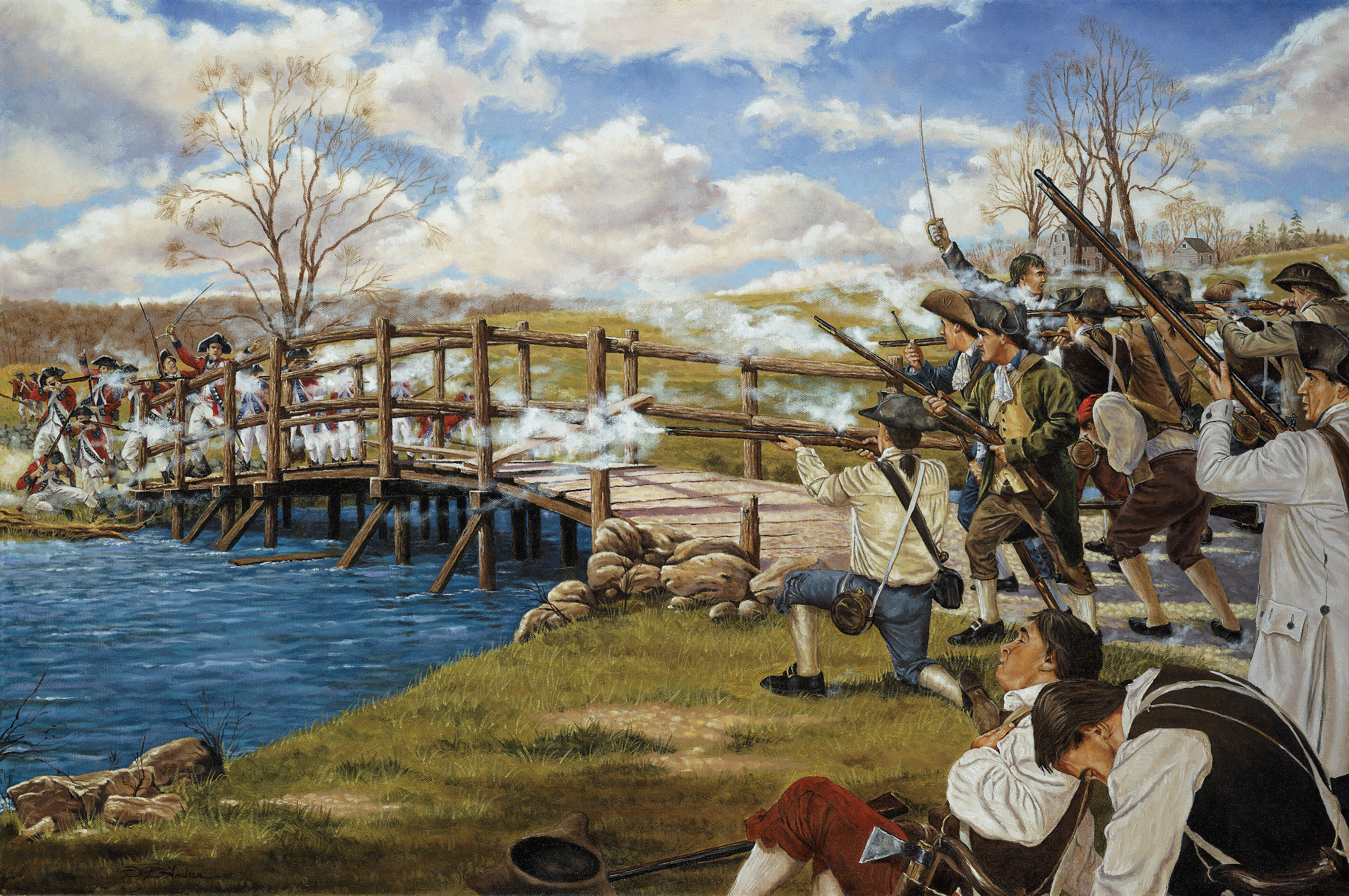
Domenick D'Andrea, The Shot Heard 'Round the World, Battles of Lexington and Concord, April 19, 1775

Bissell was a post rider who carried mail between Boston and New York for the British Crown (subject to decisions made by King George III and the British Parliament). When the British fired Benjamin Franklin from the post of Postmaster General for the British Colonies, the Patriots established mail routes. Bissell worked for them, transporting the mail, including dispatches for the Sons of Liberty along the same route. In preparation for a war, the Massachusetts Committee of Safety chose Bissel to carry the call to arms from Watertown when the war began. (Note: Bissell was said to be a member of the Committee of Safety, but its eleven members at the beginning of 1775 were Benjamin Church, Richard Devens, Jabez Fisher, John Hancock, William Heath, Azor Orne, Joseph Palmer, John Pigeon, Joseph Warren, Abraham Watson, and Benjamin White.)

== Lexington Alarm ==
=== Dispatch ===
On April 19, 1775, Joseph Palmer of the Committee of Safety sent Israel Bissell on a ride through Connecticut to warn colonists that the war with Britain had begun. The purpose of the dispatch was to have militias in five colonies rally to support the minutemen of the Massachusetts militia at the Battles of Lexington and Concord.

Bissell carried the "call to arms" message to Worcester, south and west through Connecticut, and ultimately to Philadelphia. The New York copy of the dispatch stated:

Watertown, Wednesday near
10 o'Clock, 19th April 1775.

To all the friends of American liberty be it known that this morning before break of day, a brigade, consisting of about 1,000 to 1,200 men landed at Phip's Farm, at Cambridge, and marched to Lexington, where they found a company of our colony militia in arms, upon whom they fired without any provocation, killed six men and wounded four others. — By an express from Boston, we find another brigade are now upon their march from Boston, supposed to be about 1,000. The Bearer, Israel Bissell, is charged to alarm the country quite to Connecticut, and all persons are desired to furnish him with fresh horses, as they may be needed. — I have spoken with several persons who have seen the dead and wounded; pray let the delegates from this colony to Connecticut see this, they know Col. Foster of Brookfield one of the delegates.

— J. Palmer, one of the Committee of Safety

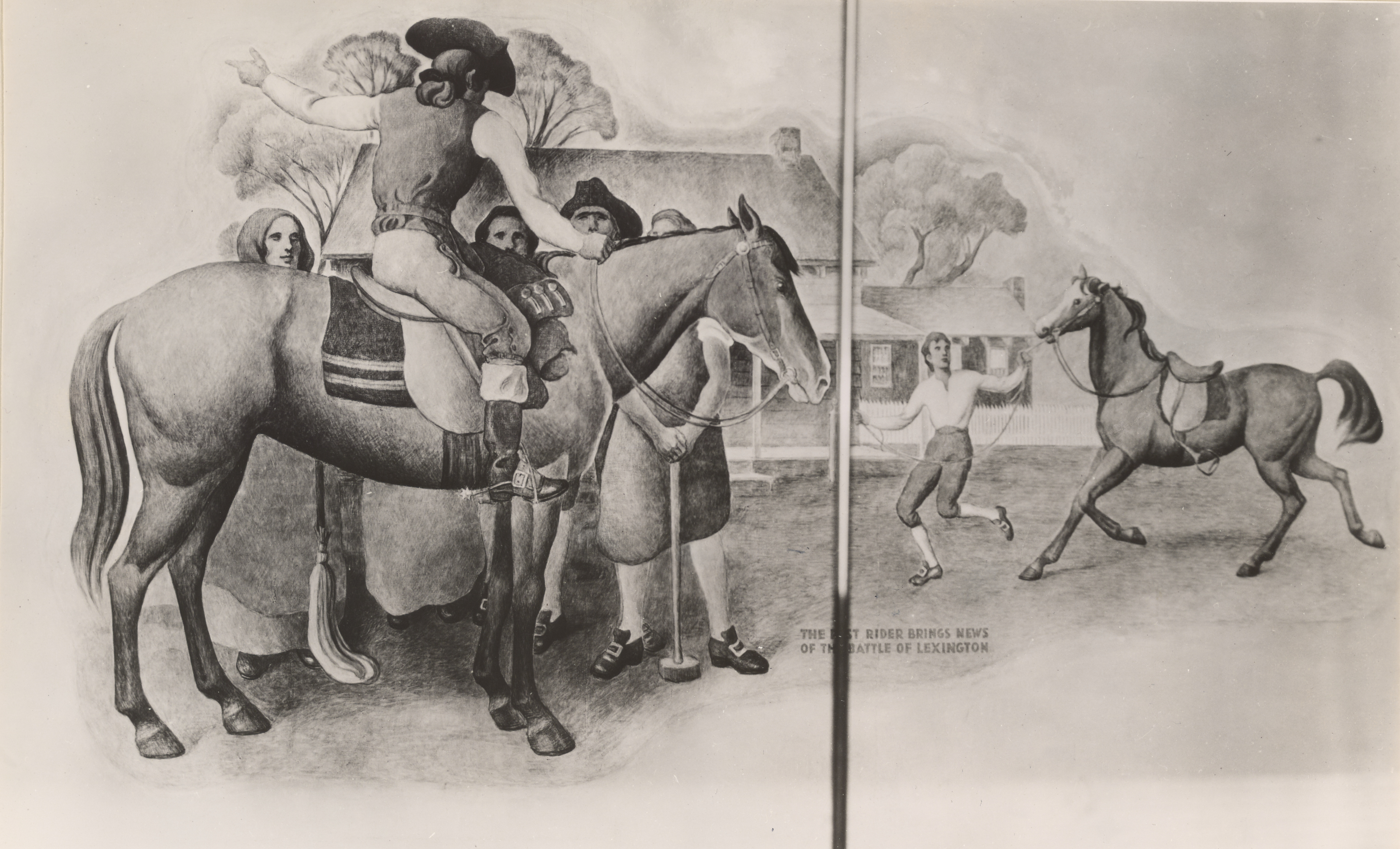
David Hutchison, The Post Rider Brings News of the Battle of Lexington, mural for the United States Post Office in New Rochelle, New York, 1940

Bissell left Palmer and traveled to Worcester, passing many people walking towards Lexington. Along the way, Bissell shouted "To arms, to arms, the war has begun" and "the war has begun, the war has begun". Townspeople rang church bells and fired cannons to alert neighboring colonists.

Bissell averaged about 69 miles (111 km) per day on the 345 miles (555 km) journey, (Note: The Sons of the Revolution state that the route was 350 miles (560 km). Hunt said that the journey was 400 miles (640 km).) requiring him to obtain fresh horses along the route. According to tradition, Bissell's horse was exhausted after the first leg from Watertown to Worcester. Bissell said to have made the trip within two hours, crossing a distance of 36 miles (58 km) that was generally one or two days travel for a post rider. (Note: Traditionally, Bissell was said to have arrived in Worcester before noon, which would have meant that he covered 36 miles (58 km) in about two hours, which Scheide said would not have been feasible. There was a kind of horse, now extinct, that were bred for speed. The Narragansett Pacer, "according to accounts, [could] travel 100 miles (160 km) in one day".)

Scheide states that Bissell may have arrived in Worcester in the late afternoon or evening and rested overnight to get to Brooklyn by 11 a.m. on April 20, 1775. The Sons of the American Revolution state that Bissell left Worcester for Connecticut on the morning of April 20, 1775, Monroe Stearns said, "Bissell rode so hard that his horse dropped dead in Worcester that night. The next morning he got a fresh horse, and rode on." (Note: Also see Smith's article, which states that the horse's fate was documented in an old history of Worcester County.)

As stated in the notice, Bissell was to ride throughout Connecticut, and yet he delivered the message to New York and ultimately to Philadelphia, where the Continental Congress convened.

Images of the dispatches, with attestations, from The Lexington Alarm by John Scheide
- Handwritten dispatch at Norwich, Connecticut, see the image between pages 50 and 51
- Handwritten dispatch at Elizabethtown, New Jersey, see the image between pages 66 and 67
- A portion of the handwritten dispatch at Philadelphia, Pennsylvania, see the image between pages 56 and 57

Bissell generally had to convince the townspeople that the dispatch was not a false alarm. The dispatch was copied for the town's records, with the original order by Joseph Palmer and attestations of the previous stops. Bissell took a break at some of the stops to get a nap and some food before he took the dispatch for the next stop on his route. Townspeople printed the alarm in broadsides and newspapers. At New Haven, the dispatch was amended to include an order to take the message on to Philadelphia, "We thought it necessary and expedient to communicate by express, expecting your speedy aid to forward the same to the Congress at Philadelphia..." At New York, the dispatch was amended by General Alexander McDougall to obtain a new rider to convey the message to Philadelphia. According to the Sons of the American Revolution, several historians believe that Israel Bissell rode the entire route to Philadelphia. From New York, the message was delivered at stops in New Jersey, before going on to Philadelphia. (Note: The map between pp. 60 and 61 of The Lexington Alarm identifies the towns that received the Lexington Alarm messages in April and May 1775.)

=== Timeline ===
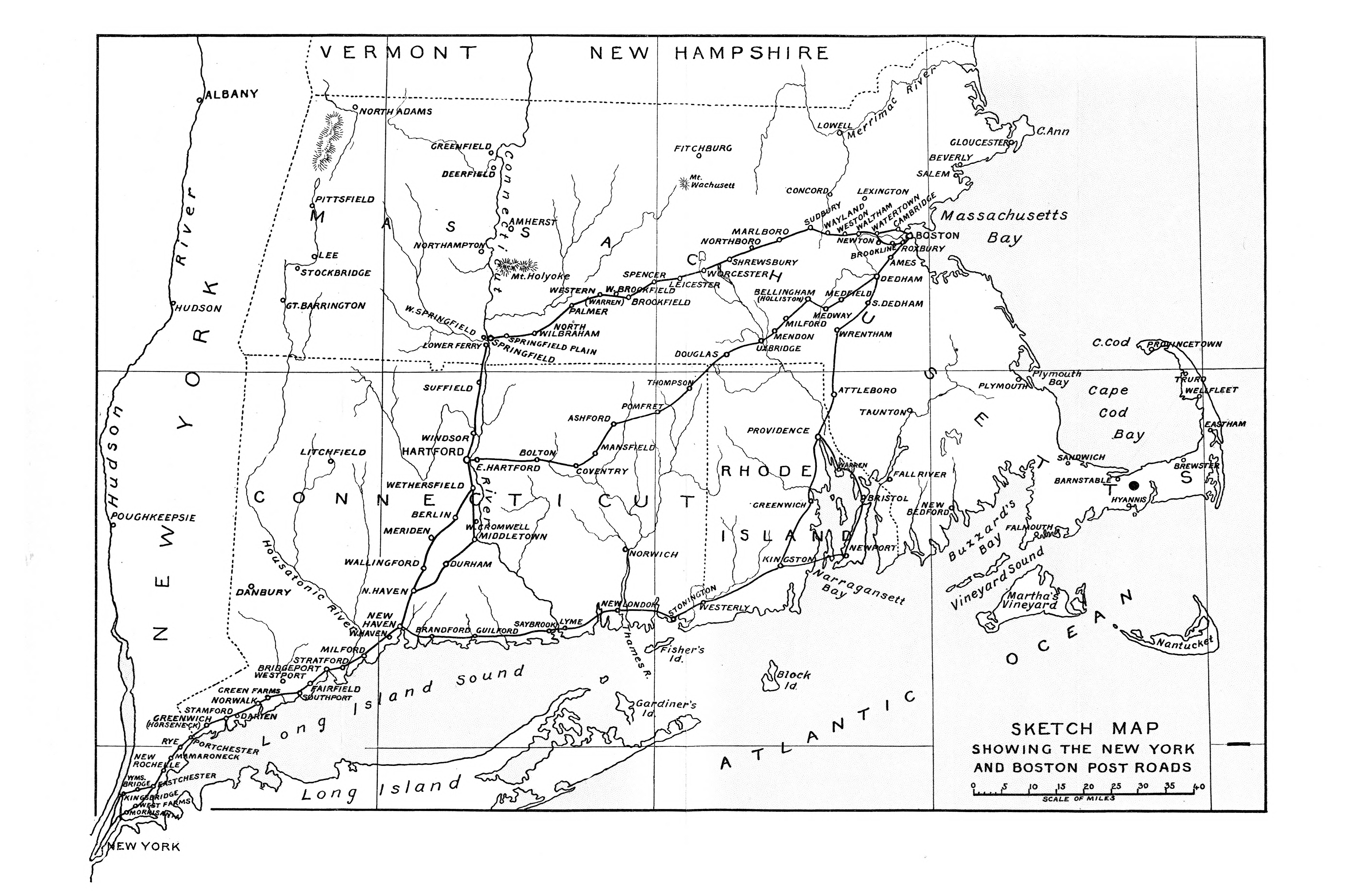
Map of Boston Post Roads, showing the Boston and New York roads, 1914

The timeline of the ride is based on the date and the time of the attestations at Bissell's stops. The attestations meant that the signers understood that the war had begun. The stops were:

- April 19, 10 a.m., Watertown, Massachusetts (Note: The Worcester Society of Antiquity states that Bissell left Watertown at 9 a.m. Captain Timothy Bigelow, and a little later, those under Captain Benjamin Flagg, for a total of 110 troops, set off for Lexington and Concord. They learned that the British returned to their camp in Boston. Hearing that news, they turned towards Cambridge, just outside of Boston. Bissell is referred to as Israel and Trail.)
- April 19, Worcester, Massachusetts (Note: From the Norwich attestation, there was no time or day indicated for Worcester.)
- April 20, Pomfret, Connecticut - Bissell told Israel Putnam, who was plowing his fields with his son Daniela, that the war had started. (Note: There are no official attestations that show that Pomfret, Connecticut, received the news with the first express. There was an update about the state of the war sent in a second Lexington Alarm update, which was likely an oral update on April 20 at 3 p.m. The notice had updated information about the Battle at Concord. The second express did not make it to Norwich until the morning of April 21.)
- April 20, 11 a.m., Brooklyn, Connecticut

External image
- "To Christopher Leffingwell Esq. Or Either the Committee of Correspondence – Norwich", Leffingwell House Museum

- April 20, 4 p.m., Norwich, Connecticut (Note: There is a copy of the handwritten document between pages 50 and 51. Governor Jonathan Trumbull was in Norwich when the town received news that the war had begun. Trumbull returned to his house in Lebanon and set up a supply depot at his store, which became the "war office". He asked express riders to get an update on the war before he convened a state assembly meeting.)
- April 20, 7 p.m., New London, Connecticut (Note: At New London, a message was added to the notice to stop in Saybrook and East Haddam.)
- April 21, 1 a.m., Lyme, Connecticut, where he took a ferry across the Connecticut River.
- April 21, 4 a.m., Old Saybrook, Connecticut
- April 21, 7 a.m., Killingworth, Connecticut
- April 21, 8 a.m., East Guilford, Connecticut
- April 21, 10 a.m., Guilford, Connecticut
- April 21, noon, Branford, Connecticut
- April 21 or 22, New Haven, Connecticut (Note: There is no attestation of when the message was received in New Haven, but it is there that a message was added to the dispatch to ride to Philadelphia.)
- April 22, 8 a.m., Fairfield, Connecticut
- April 23, 2 p.m. received per General McDougall, attestation at the 4 p.m. meeting of the Committee of Sixty, (Note: Chapman said that Bissell arrived at the Merchant's Coffee House on Wall Street at noon.) Wall Street, New York City (Note: The dispatch was addressed to Captain Isaac Sears (of the Committee of Sixty). Bissell met with the Committee of Sixty. General McDougall ordered for the rider to ride through the night and early morning of April 24. The message from New York also asked the rider to stop in New Brunswick and Elizabethtown in New Jersey.)
- April 24, Elizabeth, New Jersey (Note: The time of arrival is not known, but McDougall ordered for the rider to ride through the night and early morning of April 24.) (Note: Elias Boudinot noted in his diary that Bissell had delivered the dispatch.)
- April 24, 2 a.m., New Brunswick, New Jersey
- April 24, 6 a.m., Princeton, New Jersey
- April 24, 9, a.m., Trenton, New Jersey (Note: Bissell's name was spelled "Irael Bissel" by Fairfield and "Trail Bissel" at Trenton.) A message was said to be delivered to Trenton by Comm. Eben Hasard.
- April 24, 5 p.m., Philadelphia (Note: The copy of the call to arms that arrived in Philadelphia identified the bearer as Trail Bisel or Bisiel.) (Note: Taft said that Bissell arrived at High Street in the morning. Hunt states that Bissell arrived in Philadelphia before midnight on April 23. A copy of the handwritten document is in the collection of the Historical Society of Pennsylvania.)

Bissell may have traveled with two horses on the Upper Post Road to Worcester. Bissell then rode the Lower Post Road, where he headed south into Connecticut, and crossed the Middle Post road at Pomfret. From there, Bissell traveled a road from Norwich to New London. After his arrival, colonists and people in neighboring towns were alerted by the firing muskets and ringing of church bells that the war had begun.

Samuel Parsons of New London added a note, "You will see, by a Letter to your Committee of Correspondence, the necessity of rallying all your forces immediately... We shall march before noon tomorrow." Answering the call, Benedict Arnold of New Haven, Israel Putnam of Pomfret, and others mustered soldiers and headed for Massachusetts. Putnam assembled men for the Connecticut Militia, commanded them on their march to Boston, and arrived there at dawn. Benedict formed a group of soldiers in New Haven, including Yale College students and soldiers from the Connecticut State Guards, and followed Putnam to battle.

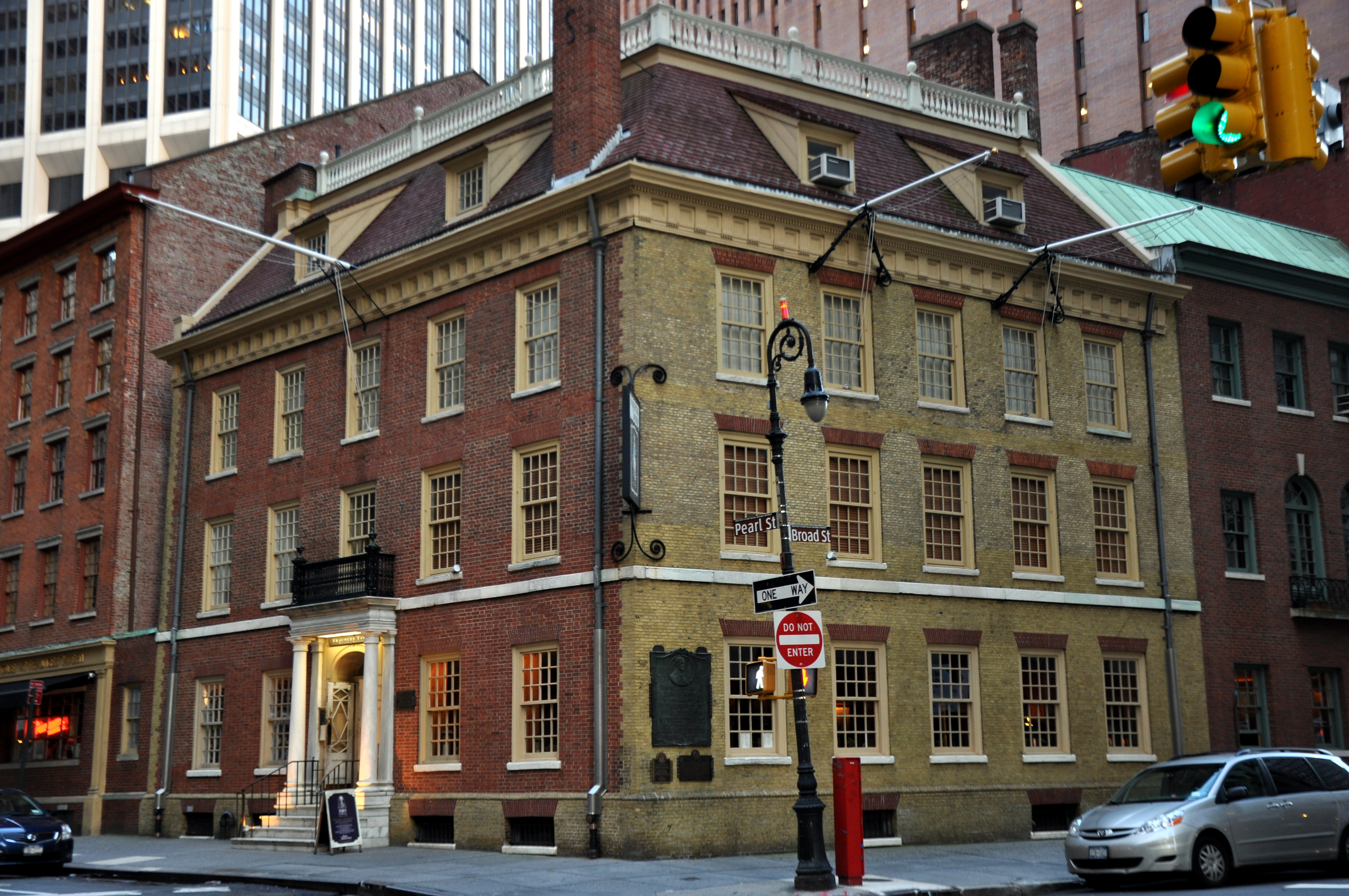
Fraunces Tavern in Lower Manhattan, a meeting place of the Committee of Sixty

A riot erupted in Manhattan, New York City, (Note: The riot was a sign of things to come with the Capture of New York City.) with news of the battles in Lexington and Concord. The colonists seized arms at City Hall and supplies destined for Boston. The patriots set two sloops on fire, closed the port, and took possession of the Custom House. Men joined the militia. By the time the news of the Lexington Alarm made it to Philadelphia, 50,000 armed colonists marched for Boston. In Philadelphia, 8,000 people assembled when they heard the ringing of the Liberty Bell.

Bissell returned to Connecticut. Copies of the manuscript were sent to other locations, like Maryland, North Carolina, and other areas. See this notice printed in Baltimore.

=== Two post riders named Bissell ===
Isaac Bissell took a westerly route in Massachusetts, from Worcester, down to Hartford, and then throughout the Connecticut countryside for a total of six days. The dispatch that Isaac carried to Springfield identifies him as the bearer.

Israel Bissell spread the word about the start of the war. His usual mail route was from Boston to New York. (Note: McKenna states that there are no vital records about Israel Bissell or records that he delivered messages about the Lexington Alarm. The Israel Bissell article documents his early life, father and brother, and that Elias Boudinot wrote in his diary that he had met Israel Bissell in Elizabethtown, New Jersey, and he was a post rider for the British, and then for the patriots.) The dispatch carried by Israel Bissell through Connecticut and to New York identified him as the bearer. The copy of the call to arms that arrived in Philadelphia identified the bearer as Trail Bisel or Bisiel.

== The war and after ==
After completing his ride, Bissell returned to Connecticut, where he joined the army alongside his brother, Justis. They both were among the men from East Windsor, Connecticut, who served under Captain Wolcott. His father, Israel Sr. also served in the war. The younger Israel served in June 1775, in Captain Stoughton's company, and, in 1776, he served under Captain Wolcott for one month. His father died in 1776, and Bissell returned to the family home to take care of the farm.

After the war, Bissell moved to Middlefield, Massachusetts, where he became a sheep farmer. Bissell married Lucy Hancock of Longmeadow, who gave birth to four children. Bissell, his wife, and three children moved to a farm in Hinsdale, Massachusetts in 1790. Bissell died there on October 24, 1823, and he was buried in the Maple Street Cemetery in Hinsdale. The Daughters of the American Revolution placed a historical marker beside his grave in 1967. Printed on the marker is "In Memory of Israel Bissell, post-rider from Lexington to Philadelphia alerting towns of the British attack at Lexington April 19, 1775." Isadore Goodman of Pittsfield donated the former Israel Bissell homestead to the Conservation Commission of Hinsdale to be used as a historical memorial.

== Legacy ==
Hinsdale historian Marion Ransford reported that the Daughters of the American Revolution installed a special marker at Bissell's grave.

In the late 1990s, David Roth artists made paintings for the Union Oyster House of Boston of historical figures including Israel Bissell.

== In popular culture ==
Bissell was the subject of "Ride, Israel, Ride", an epic poem by Marie Rockwood of Stockbridge, Massachusetts.

The remarkable ride of Israel Bissell is a partly fictional account of Bissell's ride written by Alice Schick, Marjorie N. Allen, and Joel Schick in 1976.

Gerard Chapman wrote the poem, "Listen my children and you shall hear of Israel Bissell of yesteryear, a poet-less patriot whose fame, I fear, was eclipsed by that of Paul Revere."

Bissell was portrayed by David Bluvband on the cult public access program, The Chris Gethard Show in the episode "18th Century American Gladiators", which aired in August 2014.

Bissel was mentioned in ABC's show, American Housewife, Season 5 Episode 2.

== See also ==
Midnight ride of April 18, 1775

- Paul Revere
- William Dawes
- Samuel Prescott

Danbury, Connecticut ride of April 26, 1777

- Sybil Ludington

== Bibliography ==
- Hunt, Elizabeth Norton (1965). "Israel Bissell — An Unsung Hero". The Daughters of the American Revolution Magazine. Vol. 95, no. 5. National Society of the Daughters. pp. 434–436.
- Johnston, Henry Phelps (1889). Record of service of Connecticut men in the I. War of the Revolution, II. War of 1812, III. Mexican War. Connecticut. Adjutant-General's Office. Hartford, Connecticut: Case, Lockwood & Brainard Company.
- Merritt, Elizabeth (June 1946). "The Lexington Alarm, April 19, 1775: Messages sent to the Southwaid after the Battle". Maryland Historical Magazine. Vol. XLI, no. 2.
- Scheide, John H. (April 1940). "The Lexington Alarm" (PDF). American Antiquarian.
- Smith, Walter Lewis (April 1956). "The Famous Ride Nobody Remembers". Yankee. Vol. 20, no. 4. Yankee Publishing, Inc. There is a map of Bissell's route on page 42.
- Stearns, Monroe (1967). The story of New England. New York: Random House.
