= Lexington Alarm =

Message distributed at the start of the American Revolutionary War

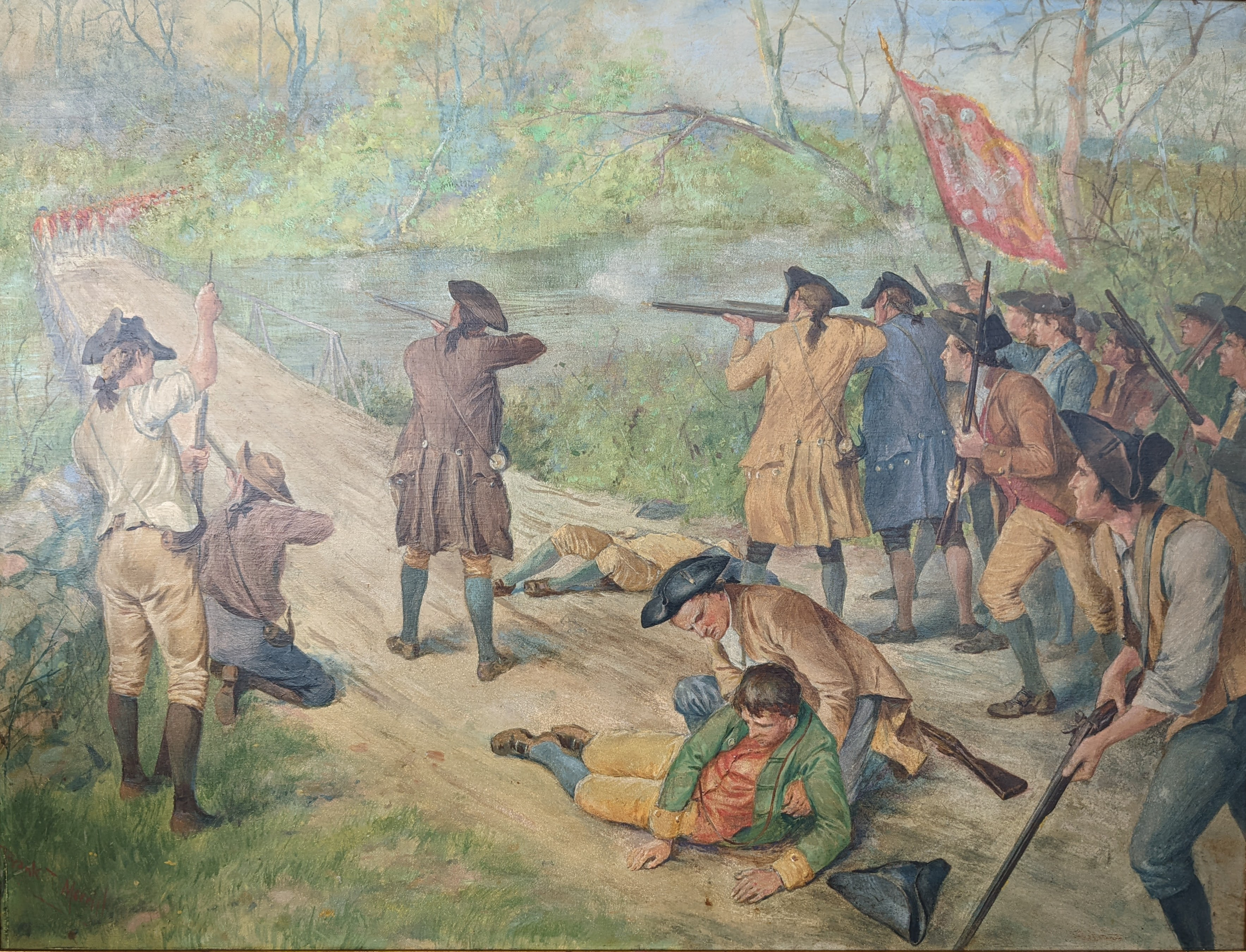
Frank T. Merrill, North Bridge, Concord, 1775 (oil painting, 1909). The Battles of Lexington and Concord began on April 19, 1775, with the shot heard round the world at the North Bridge and Lexington Green

The Lexington Alarm announced, throughout the American Colonies, that the Revolutionary War began with the Battle of Lexington and the Siege of Boston on April 19, 1775. The goal was to rally patriots at a grass roots level to fight against the British and support the minutemen of the Massachusetts militia.

== Committees of correspondence ==
As the British Crown and Parliament policies created an increasingly greater divide with American colonists, the Sons of Liberty organization was founded. Samuel Adams led the creation of the Committees of correspondence, including the Committee of safety, to uphold the rights of colonists and communicate and respond to noteworthy events. Adams brought the issue before a town meeting in Boston on November 2, 1772. Soon the organization spread to other towns in Massachusetts and like-minded organizations were established by July 1773, in other colonies. A committee for intercolonial correspondence was established by Virginia's House of Burgesses. By 1774, there were committees established in every colony.

Wherever the power of Great Britain was thrown off or disavowed, all political control passed by its natural course into the hands of the people… Hence the primary movement was to bring the people to understand their interests and act in concert, and the first means used to attain this end was the establishment of Committees of Correspondence in different parts of the country.

— Jared Sparks, American historian and educator

The network that was created allowed for planning and execution of activities when the colonial assemblies and the Continental Congress were not in session. Although the committees were not started as revolutionary endeavors, according E. D. Collins' Committees of Correspondence, "Its importance as a piece of revolutionary machinery can hardly be overestimated."

Towns developed the methods that they would use to manage and respond to dispatches, with Boston central to the overall network's operations. There were up to 8,000 delegates, or members, to the committee across the colonies, which became a mechanism for patriots to communicate with other patriots. Loyalists did not have a similar means to communicate throughout the colonies, which impacted the result of the war.

A false alarm was generated when the British removed 250 half-barrels of gunpowder from a powder house in Charlestown, Massachusetts on September 1, 1774. Thirteen boats carried 260 British soldiers to carry off the gunpowder. A man warned that British soldiers were headed for Cambridge, initiating the Powder Alarm. At about the same time, a communication was sent of the perceived threat, and a group of men left on horseback to investigate the happenings at the British camp. They reported that there was no movement there. In the meantime, a message that men were shot in Boston by the British was carried through Connecticut to New York by September 5 and the next day to Philadelphia, where the First Continental Congress was held on September 6. The Congress, with Joseph Palmer, planned for a network of couriers to transport messages throughout the colonies. A Committee of safety was formed in October 1774 to evaluate the need for alarms and set them in motion. Its eleven members at the beginning of 1775 were Benjamin Church, Richard Devens, Jabez Fisher, John Hancock, William Heath, Azor Orne, Joseph Palmer, John Pigeon, Joseph Warren, Abraham Watson, and Benjamin White.

Realizing the ramifications of a communication going out that would result in men being mustered and commencing to fight, Joseph Hawley, a member of the Massachusetts Provincial Congress, wrote on February 22, 1775,

I have been most seriously contemplating the commission and most important trust of our committee of safety, and especially that branch of it which relates to their mustering the minutemen and others of the militia... The soldiers, when thus mustered... will suppose it their duty to fight... They will suppose that the continent have devolved the resolution ofthat question upon this province, and that this province have devolved it on the committee of safety, and that the committee, by calling them, have decided it... Thus, hostilities will be commenced...

When once the blow is struck it must be followed, and we must conquer, or all is lost forever... I beg of you, therefore, as you love your country, to use your utmost influence with our committee of safety, that the people be not mustered, and that hostilities be not commenced, until we have the express, categorical decision of the continent, that the time is absolutely come that hostilities ought to begin.

== Rides beginning April 18, 1775 ==
=== Initial rides ===
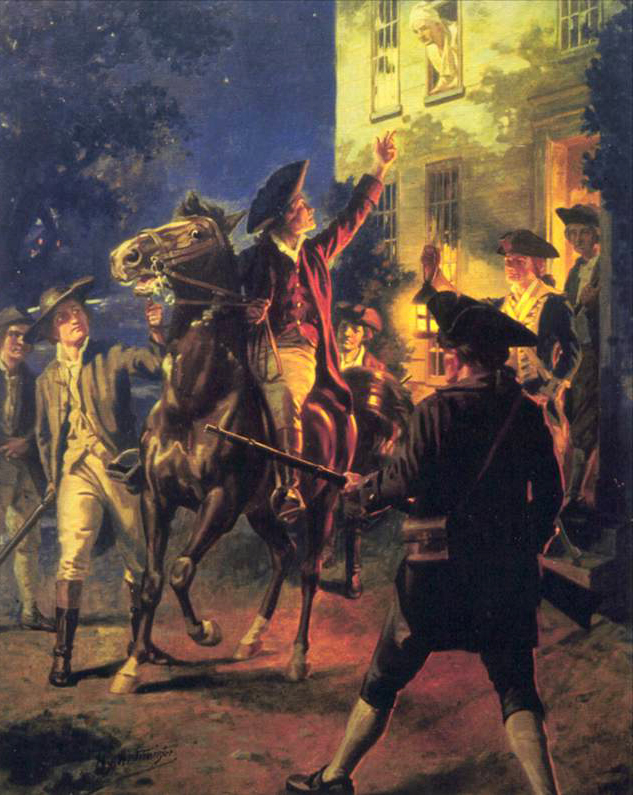
Hy Hintermeister (either John Henry or his son Henry), Revere arousing Hancock and Adams

At about 10:00 p.m., the night of April 18, 1775, Joseph Warren asked Paul Revere to contact John Hancock and Samuel Adams in Lexington about the movement of British troops. Warren and Hancock were members of the Committee of safety and Revere had been watching the British troops movements as part of a committee of Boston and delivered messages for the Committee of safety. Warren also asked William Dawes to ride to Lexington.

During the nighttime ride to Lexington, Revere ensured that men in Charlestown sent lantern signals to alarm neighboring colonists that the British were coming. He learned from Richard Devens, another safety committee member, that ten British officers had been on the road leaving Lexington. He notified the captain of the militia men at Medford and alarmed others on his way to Lexington.

After meeting with Adams and Hancock, Revere and Dawes set off to warn colonists in Concord. They preceded the British, led by General Thomas Gage, as they marched to Concord to destroy patriots' stores of military weapons and equipment. Responding to the call to arms, colonists went to Concord and fought the British.

A National Park Service map showing the route of the initial patriot messengers, Paul Revere, William Dawes, and Samuel Prescott

=== Dispatches sent beginning April 19 ===
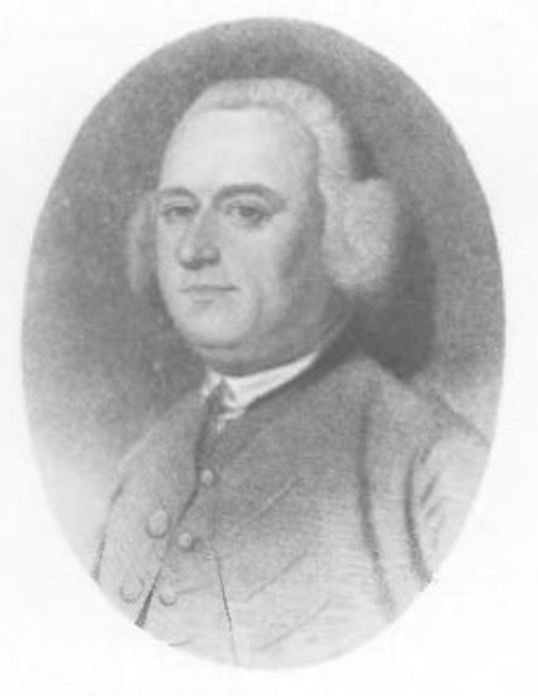
Joseph Palmer 1716–1788, issued the Lexington Alarm on April 19, 1775

On April 19, 1775, Joseph Palmer of the Committee of Safety issued a dispatch to be carried by post riders, men who delivered mail throughout the colonies. The purpose of the call to arms was to have militias in five colonies rally to support the minutemen of the Massachusetts militia.

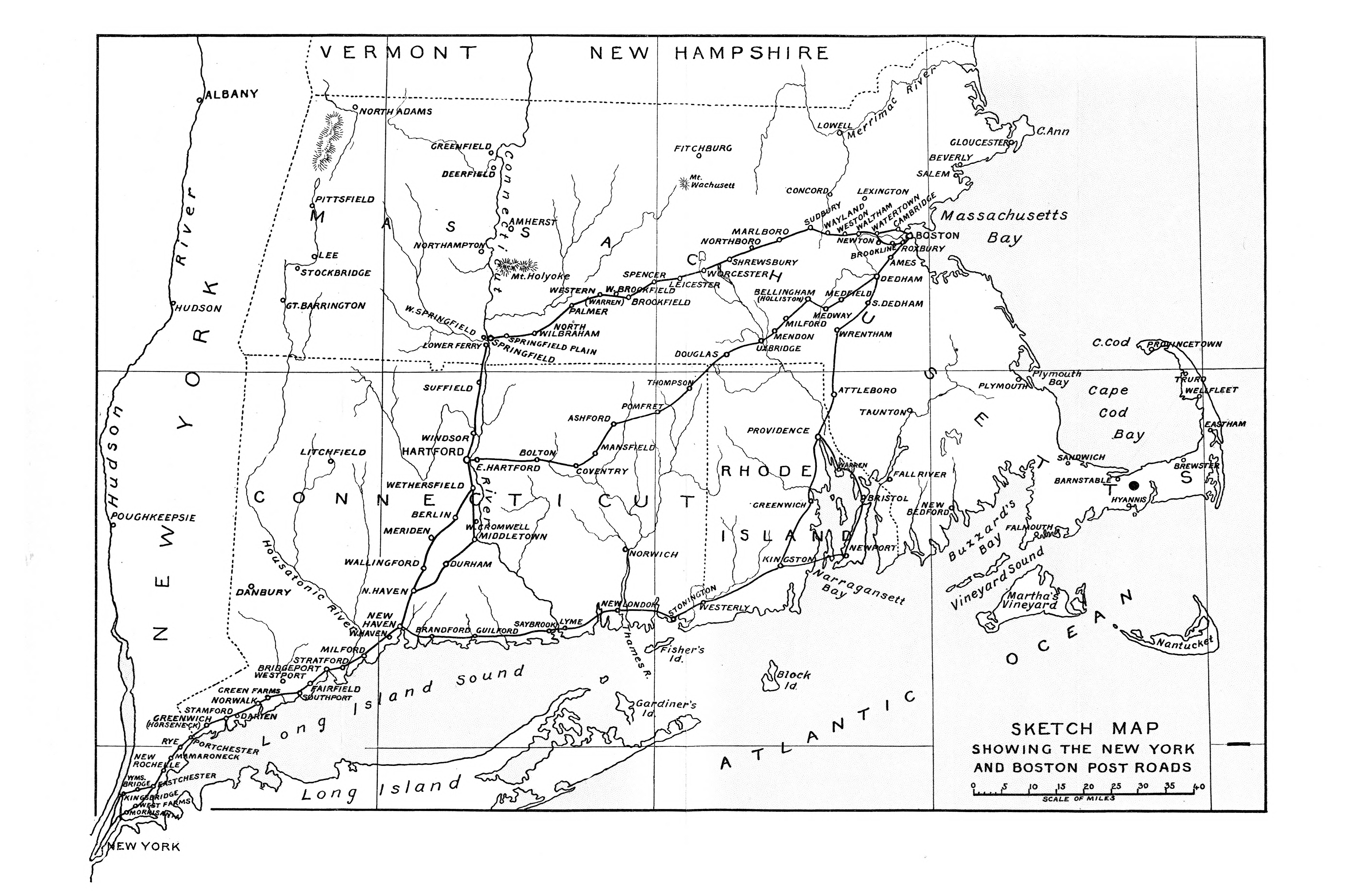
Map of Boston Post Roads, 1914

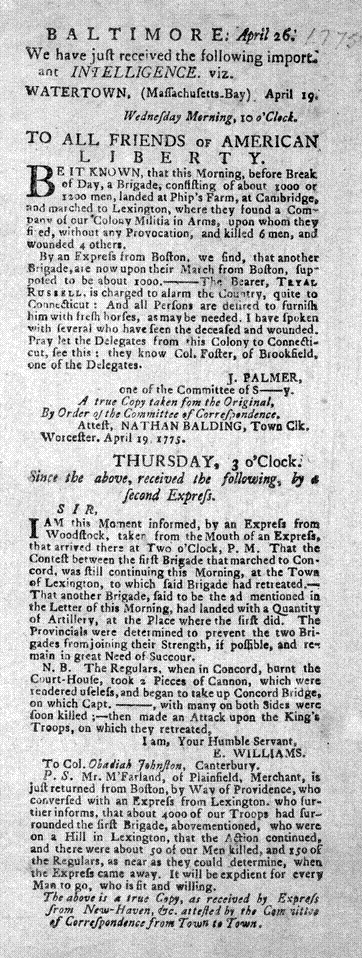
Dispatch that went through New York and later on to Baltimore, arriving there on April 26.

A number of post riders carried the "Lexington Alarm" message throughout a network of mail routes in Massachusetts, Connecticut, Rhode Island, and New Hampshire.

Isaac Bissell delivered the message west of Worcester to Springfield, Massachusetts, south to Hartford, Connecticut and in other areas in the state over six days.

Israel Bissell (no known relationship) conveyed the message to Worcester, Massachusetts, throughout eastern and southern Connecticut to New York City, New Jersey, and Philadelphia. Copies of the manuscript, handbills, and newspapers were circulated to other locations, like Maryland, North Carolina, and other areas.

Postriders rode through bad weather, poor road conditions, and moonless nights, which controlled whether they were able to travel three to five miles an hour.

=== Continued circulation ===
A copy reached Baltimore, Maryland, on April 26, where Mary Katherine Goddard printed the verbiage in the Baltimore Adviser and the Maryland Journal. It was printed in the Maryland Gazetter the following day in Annapolis, Maryland. On April 29, Alexander Purdie printed the message in the Virginia Gazette in Williamsburg, Virginia.

Another copy of the dispatch went to New Bern, North Carolina, where it was endorsed, and another to Charleston, South Carolina. The message was spread to other towns in Virginia, North Carolina, and South Carolina in May. (Note: A map printed on page 95 in the Maryland Historical Magazine shows the route from Watertown, Massachusetts, through eastern and southern Connecticut, to New York, New Jersey, Philadelphia, and to Alexandria, Virginia.)

== Subsequent messages ==
Updates provided information about the continuance of fights against the British and related news. New York communicated that martial law was implemented due to riots due to the outbreak of the war. Shipping became unsafe for Baltimore and other areas.

== Bibliography ==
- Borneman, Walter R. (2014). American spring : Lexington, Concord, and the road to revolution. New York: Little, Brown and Company. ISBN 978-0-316-22102-3.
- Hunt, Elizabeth Norton (1965). "Israel Bissell — An Unsung Hero". The Daughters of the American Revolution Magazine. Vol. 95, no. 5. National Society of the Daughters. pp. 434–436.
- Merritt, Elizabeth (June 1946). "The Lexington Alarm, April 19, 1775: Messages sent to the Southwaid after the Battle". Maryland Historical Magazine. Vol. XLI, no. 2.
- Philbrick, Nathaniel (2013). Bunker Hill. Wheeler Publishing. ISBN 978-1-4104-5778-3.
- Scheide, John H. (April 1940). "The Lexington Alarm" (PDF). American Antiquarian.
