= Mary Tyler Peabody Mann =

American teacher and author (1806–1887)

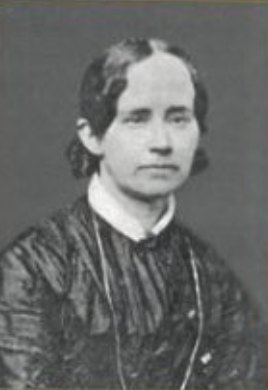
- Portrait of Mary Peabody Mann
- Born: Mary Tyler Peabody; November 16, 1806; Cambridge, Massachusetts
- Died: February 11, 1887 (aged 80); Jamaica Plain, Massachusetts
- Occupations: Teacher, schoolmistress, writer, and education reformer
- Known for: Pioneer of kindergarten schools, liberal thinker and reformer, and author of Life and Works of Horace Mann
- Spouse: Horace Mann (m. 1843; died 1859)
- Parent(s): Nathaniel Peabody (father); Elizabeth Palmer Peabody (mother)
- Relatives: Elizabeth Peabody (sister); Sophia Peabody Hawthorne (sister); Nathaniel Hawthorne (brother-in-law)

Mary Tyler Mann (née Peabody; November 16, 1806 – February 11, 1887) was an American teacher, author, and reformer. Mary was one of three Peabody sisters who were influential women of their day in education, literature, and art. Like her sister Elizabeth, she was a leader in education reform and establishment of kindergartens. Sophia was an artist and the wife of Nathaniel Hawthorne. Mary was a participant in the Transcendentalism Movement. She was an abolitionist. She supported the work of her husband Horace Mann, an American education reformer and politician, as well as Henry David Thoreau, Nathaniel Hawthorne, and Sarah Winnemucca.

Mary Peabody began teaching at eighteen, first in Maine, then as a governess in Cuba, and she was a tutor and teacher in Massachusetts. She established a school for young children in Salem, Massachusetts about 1836. After her husband died in 1859, Mary Mann and her sister Elizabeth opened the first kindergarten school in the country, where they taught gymnastics, music, French, and social skills in addition to reading, writing, and arithmetic. They published the book Moral Culture of Infancy and Kindergarten Guide to provide information about how to set up and operate a kindergarten.

Among her many publications, she contributed to Domingo Faustino Sarmiento's Facundo, which was first published in 1868.

== Personal life ==
=== Early life ===
Mary Tyler Peabody was born on November 16, 1806, in Cambridgeport, Massachusetts, the daughter of Nathaniel and Elizabeth (née Palmer) Peabody, the granddaughter of Joseph Palmer, a general during the American Revolutionary War. The Peabodys were a two-income family. Elizabeth advocated for preschool child education and taught school. Nathaniel was an apothecary, doctor, and dentist. Her sisters were Elizabeth, reformer, educator, and pioneer in establishing kindergarten schools and Sophia, painter and the wife of Nathaniel Hawthorne. She had three brothers, Nathaniel, George Francis, and Wellington Peabody. George and Wellington died in their twenties; George from yellow fever and Wellington from spinal tuberculosis. Nathaniel relied on his sister Elizabeth for his living expenses.

The Peabody family lived in Salem and worshiped at the Second Church (later Unitarian Church) in Salem, Massachusetts. The children received a thorough education at home. Elizabeth Peabody operated a school from the family home, providing a classical education for boys and girls. Her father taught Mary Latin and encouraged her acquiring nine other languages. Nathaniel tutored the Peabody children.

In 1820, the Peabodys moved to a farm in Lancaster, Massachusetts, and daughter Elizabeth taught and ran the school beginning at age 16, based upon what she learned from her mother's tutelage. Young Elizabeth taught from an enlightened perspective, helping her students build character, grow spiritually, and engage in discussions about school work. In 1822, the Peabodys left the farm life of Lancaster for the social city life of Salem, where Nathaniel worked as a dentist.

=== The Peabody sisters ===
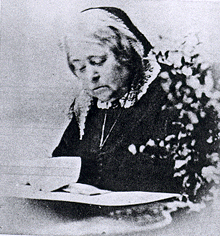
Elizabeth Peabody

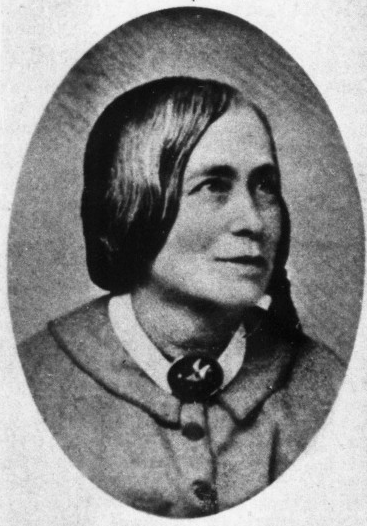
Sophia Peabody Hawthorne

The Peabody sisters, intelligent and capable on their own, were stronger together. Sophia was an artist. Elizabeth and Mary were educators who played significant roles in the creation of kindergarten programs and improvements to traditional education. In 1825, Elizabeth and Mary lived in boarding house on Beacon Hill, where they met a fellow boarder Horace Mann in 1832 or 1833. Rebecca Clarke, the mother of James Freeman Clarke, operated the boarding house, Ashburton Place. Living there at the time were George Stillman Hillard, Edward Kennard Rand, and Jared Sparks. The sisters were Unitarians who embraced the Transcendentalism movement and supported fellow Transcendentalists Henry David Thoreau, Nathaniel Hawthorne, who married Sophia. The three women, and Mary in particular, supported Horace Mann's career.

Mann, a widow, had moved to Boston to recover from the loss of his wife. Elizabeth , Mary and Mann frequently talked about their lives and viewpoints. Sometimes, they read to one another. The young women helped Mann manage what Josephine E. Roberts called his "hopeless sorrow". She shared an interest in education with Horace Mann, who was widowed. Although working in the fields of politics and the law, Mann had developed his educational theories. In Estimate of Horace Mann, Mary wrote "I learned from him what night of the soul he had been nurtured and realized for the first time what a misfortune to mankind has been that creed which dishonors God and disenchants man."

In 1833, Mary went to Cuba, where she worked as a governess and looked after her sister Sophia, who went to the country to recuperate from some medical conditions. Mary and Sophia lived there until 1835, when they returned to Salem, where Mary taught until 1840. During that time, Mary and Mann stayed in contact via letters. Mann visited and wrote to Elizabeth periodically to learn what she know of Mary. He said that Mary's letters, written to him or Elizabeth, "affect me like music and more." Mary questioned Elizabeth about the affection and "brotherly tenderness" she shared with Mann during his visits. After Mary returned from Cuba, Mann visited and wrote Mary regularly in Salem in friendship and confidence, to the exclusion of her sister Elizabeth. It was not, though, like Sophia's courtship with Nathaniel Hawthorne. In 1840, Mary lived above the West Street Bookshop near Beacon Hill and Boston Common in Boston with her sisters and parents. Sophia and Mary lived there until they were married. Elizabeth purchased foreign journals and books for her business, which was part bookstore, a lending library, and a place for scholars, liberal thinkers, and transcendentalists to meet.

=== Marriage and children ===
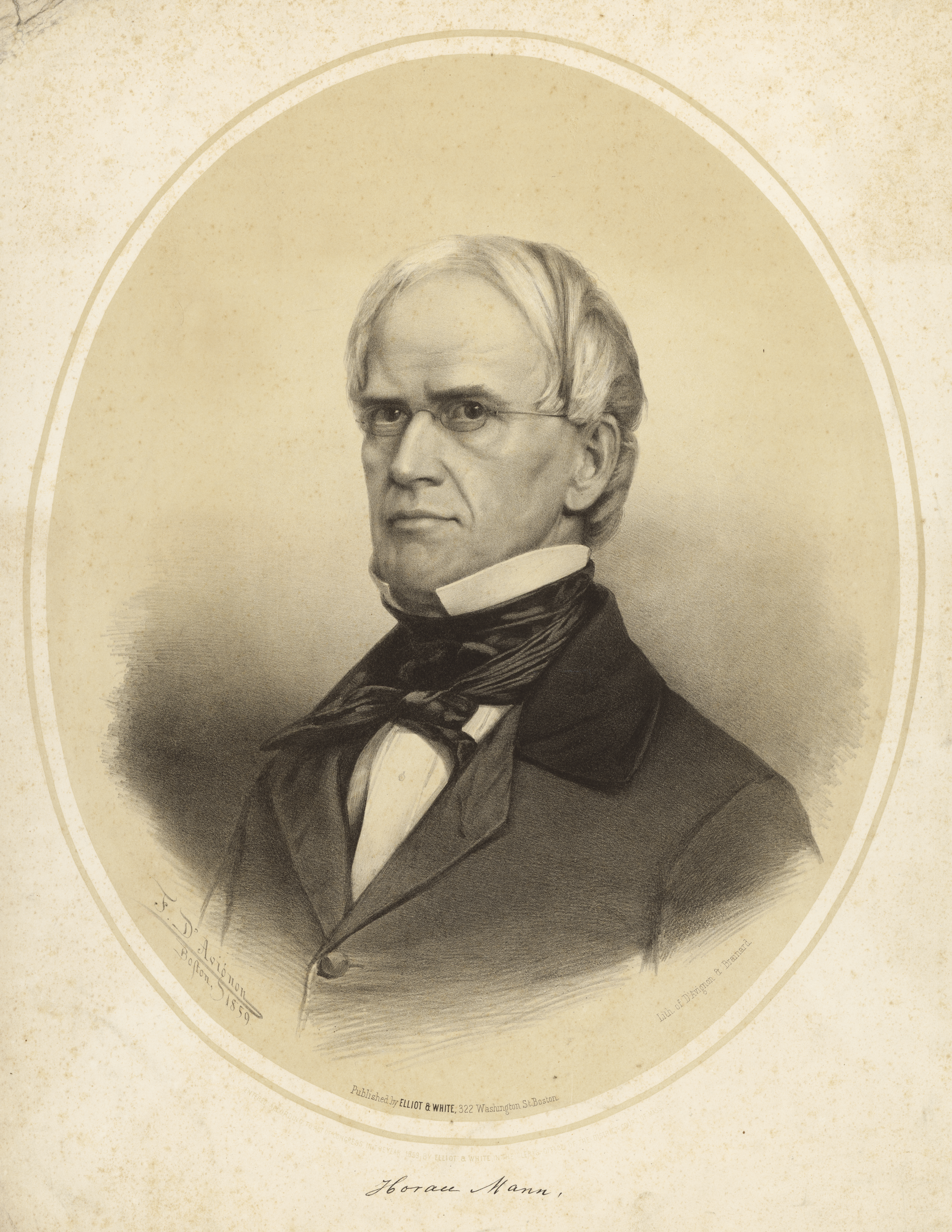
Francis D'Avignon, Horace Mann, lithograph, 1859, National Portrait Gallery, Washington, D.C.

External image
- Portrait of Mary and Benjamin

After knowing each other for a decade, Mary Peabody was engaged to Horace Mann in April 1843 and married him on May 1, 1843, becoming Mary Peabody Mann. She was his second wife. They were married at the Peabody home above Elizabeth Peabody's West Street Bookstore in Boston and set sail the same day on the Britannia for Europe. (Note: Roberts states that they sailed on the Hibernia, but that ship sailed from Boston on May 16. As Tharp states, they sailed on the Britannia, which sailed on May 1.) Newlyweds Samuel Gridley Howe and Julia Ward joined the Manns on their extended honeymoon. Horace had taken an extended leave of absence to study schools and other institutions—like prisons, asylums, and orphanages—while in Halifax and Europe. His notes of the visits were the source material for his "Seventh Annual Report", and the recognition of what would be useful ideas to implement and what should be avoided. The couples returned on the Britannia on November 6, 1853.

The Manns had three children: Horace Mann Jr., George Mann, and Benjamin Mann. After her children were born, Mary homeschooled the boys. Horace Mann Jr. died at the age of 24 on November 11, 1868. At the time of her death, George was a principal of Jamaica Plain High School, and Benjamin was a professor of the Smithsonian Institution in Washington, D.C.

Following her husband's death in 1859, Mary purchased a house in Concord, Massachusetts, and Elizabeth lived with her and her children. Mary Tyler Peabody Mann died in Jamaica Plain, Massachusetts, by February 11, 1887, and she was buried at the North Burial Ground in Providence, Rhode Island.

== Career ==
=== Educator ===
Mary Peabody left home at eighteen to teach school in Hallowell, Maine, where her sister Elizabeth had taught. In 1825, she moved to Boston to assist Elizabeth in the operation of a school. Mary and Elizabeth developed an "active interest" in the work of Samuel Gridley Howe and his school, Perkins School for the Blind, after they visited the school with Mann, who sat on the board of trustees. Returning to Boston from Cuba, Mary moved in with her brother George in March 1835, and found employment tutoring an Italian student. At that time Elizabeth taught at Amos Bronson Alcott's experimental Temple School, and Mary substituted for her briefly. Alcott had two revolutionary approaches to education: he did not think that punishment and memorization were necessary for a good education. Mary established a school for young children and lived in Salem.

Meanwhile, in 1837, Mann was appointed secretary to the Massachusetts Board of Education, founded that year. Mary devoted a great deal of time acting as the underpaid statesman's secretary and assistant. Although the board of education's powers were limited, Mann, with Mary's assistance, shaped public opinion regarding school problems and created public support for increasing the pay of teachers and improving their training through the founding of state normal, or teacher-training, schools.

When married, Mary homeschooled her boys, and during that time, she did not have outside teaching positions. In 1859 or 1860, she opened the first public kindergarten in the country on Beacon Hill in Boston with her sister Elizabeth. They influenced the creation of public kindergarten schools. The school taught reading, writing, arithmetic, gymnastics, singing, and French. They encouraged moral and positive social engagement among the children. They wrote the Moral Culture of Infancy and Kindergarten Guide in 1863 to provide information about how to set up and operate a kindergarten.

=== Shared efforts with her husband ===
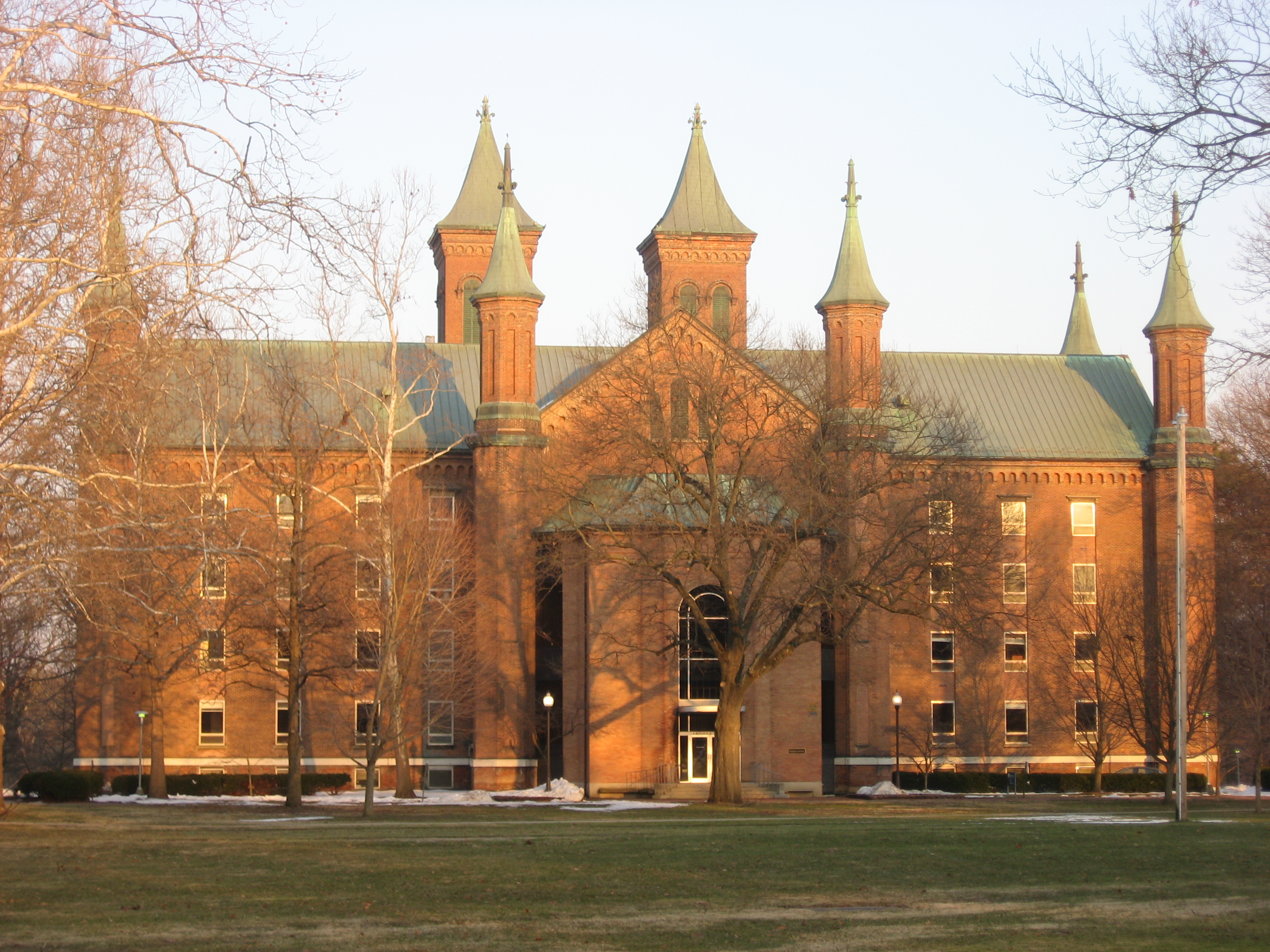
Antioch Hall, Antioch College

During her husband's life she shared in all his benevolent and educational work. Her familiarity with modern languages enabled her to assist him greatly in his studies of foreign reforms. She was Horace Mann's private secretary for many years. She contributed to Common School Journal that he published. Mary Peabody Mann filled the role of president's wife and acted as unofficial Dean of Women after Horace accepted the presidency of Antioch College, a coeducational school in Ohio. Antioch is noteworthy for being the first college in the United States to provide men and women with the same educational opportunities and programs.

=== Reformer ===
Mary, like her husband, was a reformer. For instance, they both were very interested in education reform. During the Antebellum period, she wrote and spoke against slavery. In her book Christianity in the Kitchen: A Physiological Cookbook, Mary expresses that certain foods, like alcohol and oysters, are not healthy and other foods are good for one's health. She asserts that a person who is careful about choosing healthy foods is an example of true Christianity.

=== Author ===
Mary wrote about women's rights, child care, kindergarten, and free education for underprivileged children. Her work was published as essays, in magazines, and books. Her children's book, The Flower People: Being an Account of the Flowers by Themselves; Illustrated with Plates, was published in 1838.

Life and Works of Horace Mann by Mary Tyler Peabody Mann (620 pages)

Mary wrote the Life and Works of Horace Mann, in which there was a veiled identification of her as his interpreter or friend. It was published in three volumes. There is only one reference to Mary: "On 1 May 1843, Mr. Mann was again married, and sailed for Europe to visit European schools, especially in Germany, where he expected to derive most benefit."

Her writings, especially those on the kindergarten system, with her sister, Elizabeth Palmer Peabody, are distinguished for vigor of thought and felicity of expression. She published Flower People (1838); Christianity in the Kitchen, a Physiological Cook-Book (Boston, 1857); Culture in Infancy, with Elizabeth Palmer Peabody (1863); Life of Horace Mann (1865); and Juanita, a Romance of Real Life in Cuba, published after her death (1887). The collaboration of Mary and Elizabeth included promoting the speaking career of Sarah Winnemucca Hopkins, the first Native American woman known to secure a copyright and to publish in the English language. In addition, Mary helped Hopkins with her book, Life among the Piutes: Their Wrongs and Claims (1883). Mary used her portion of the book’s earnings to open schools.

In her eightieth year, Mary began to write her first novel; Juanita: A Romance of Real Life in Cuba Fifty Years Ago (1887) appeared posthumously. Elizabeth Peabody commented, "The story is fiction; but the principal characters and the most important incidents are real—it was this that made the author keep back the book from publication till all were dead… It was the merest accident that the work was not published before my sister's death, as she so earnestly desired it should be."

=== Publications ===
Works Mary Tyler Peabody Man wrote or contributed to, in order by the original published date:

- Mann, Mary Tyler Peabody (1888) [1838]. The Flower People: Being an Account of the Flowers by Themselves; Illustrated with Plates. Boston: Lee and Shepard.
- Mann, Mary Tyler Peabody (1851) [1841]. A primer of reading, spelling, and drawing. Philadelphia: William P. Hazard. OCLC 1043555425.
- Mann, Mary Tyler Peabody (1857). Christianity in the Kitchen, a Physiological Cook-Book. Boston: Ticknor and Fields.
- Peabody, Elizabeth Palmer; Mann, Mary Tyler Peabody (1863). Moral Culture of Infancy, and Kindergarten Guide: With Music for the Plays. Boston: T.O.H.P. Burnham.
- Sarmiento, Domingo Faustino; Mann, Mary Tyler Peabody (2022) [1868]. Facundo: Ó, Civilización I Barbarie En Las Pampas Arjentinas (in French). Legare Street Press. ISBN 978-1-01-843585-5.
- Mann, Mary Tyler Peabody (1869). "New Methods for Improving Domestics". Herald of Health.
- Mann, Mary Tyler Peabody (1872). "A Woman's View of Intemperance". Arthur's Lady's Home Magazine.
- Winnemucca, Sarah (2019) [1883]. Mary Tyler Peabody Mann (ed.). Life Among the Piutes: Their Wrongs and Claims . Franklin Classics. ISBN 978-0-341-69556-1.
- Mann, Mary Tyler Peabody (1887). Juanita: A Romance of Real Life in Cuba Fifty Years Ago. D. Lothrop Company. Archived from the original on May 30, 2011.
- Mann, Mary Tyler Peabody (1891). G. C. Mann (ed.). Life and Works of Horace Mann (three volumes). Extended edition in five volumes.

== Bibliography ==
- Roberts, Josephine E. (1945). "Horace Mann and the Peabody Sisters". The New England Quarterly. 18 (2): 164–180. doi:10.2307/361283. ISSN 0028-4866. JSTOR 361283.
- Seavey, Lura Rogers (2004). "Elizabeth Palmer Peabody". More Than Petticoats: Remarkable Massachusetts Women. Twodot. ISBN 978-0-7627-2599-1.
- Tharp, Louise Hall (1953). Until victory : Horace Mann and Mary Peabody. Boston: Little, Brown.
