= William Tufts Brigham =

American geologist and botanist

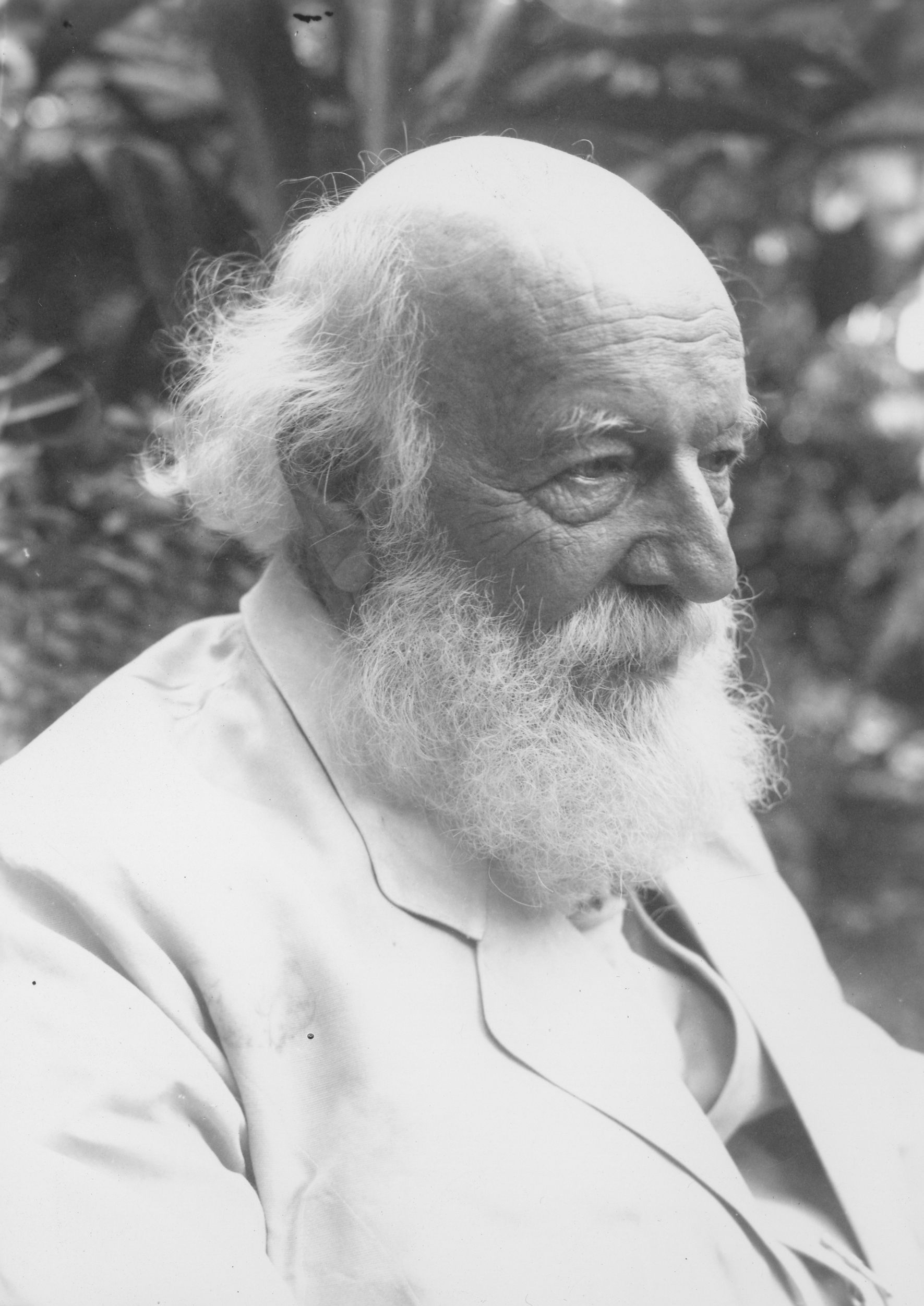
William Tufts Brigham

William Tufts Brigham (1841–1926) was an American geologist, botanist, ethnologist and the first director of the Bernice P. Bishop Museum in Honolulu.

== Biography ==
William Tufts Brigham was born on May 24, 1841. After finishing the Boston Latin School he attended the Harvard University and graduated with the degree Master of Arts in 1862. In 1864 he studied Botany and from 1864 and 1865 he accompanied botanist Horace Mann Jr. on Botanical surveys to the Hawaiian Islands where they discovered many new plant taxa.

In 1867, Brigham was called to the bar after moving back to Boston to study law under the tutelage of his father. He taught biology for a year at Harvard and over the next dozen years lectured and published books and articles on classical art, volcanology, geology, seismology, and botany.

In 1883, he joined a group of entrepreneurs that bought and operated a plantation in Guatemala. The venture failed, and he declared bankruptcy. During bankruptcy proceedings, a shortage of $17,000 was discovered in his legal trust account (more than $375,000 in 2009 dollars). Brigham was arrested in February 1887 for allegedly embezzling the money. Though the charges were never proven, he was forced to liquidate all his remaining assets, and “his family and friends cast him out, penniless and destitute.” He fled to Hawaii, where he was given a job by his old friend Charles Reed Bishop.

By 1892 Bishop hired him as the first curator of the Bernice P. Bishop Museum and from 1898 until his firing in 1918 he was the first director of that museum. He died on January 30, 1926. Brigham was a Fellow of the American Academy of Arts and Sciences, of the California Academy of Sciences, of the Philadelphia Academy of Natural Sciences. The Hawaiian lobelioid genus Brighamia was named in his honour.

Brigham authored 46 articles and monographs on Hawaiian botany, geology, and material culture such as mat weaving, tapa cloth, feather work, and stone and wood carvings.

== Selected works ==
- Bibliography of the Hawaiian Islands (with Sanford B. Dole), 1869
- Cast catalogue of antique sculpture; With an introduction to the study of ornament, 1874
- Northern California, Oregon, and the Sandwich Islands, (with Charles Nordhoff) (Online), 1875
- Guatemala: The Land of the Quetzal, 1887
- Hawaiian Kapas from the Collection in the Bernice Pauahi Bishop Museum of Ethnology and Natural History, 1893 (the book includes over 200 samples of tapa or kapa bark-cloth and only 3 copies were issued, now located at the Smithsonian Libraries; the British Museum library; and the Australian Museum library in Sydney)
- Hawaiian feather work, 1899
- An index to the islands of the Pacific Ocean : a handbook to the chart on the walls of the Bernice Pauahi Bishop Museum of Polynesian Ethnology and Natural History, 1900
- A handbook for visitors to the Bernice Pauahi Bishop Museum of Polynesian Ethnology and Natural History (Online), 1903
- Additional notes on Hawaiian feather work, 1903
- Old Hawaiian Carvings: Memoirs the Bernice Pauahi Bishop Museum, 1906
- The ancient Hawaiian house, 1908
- The volcanoes of Kilauea and Mauna Loa on the island of Hawaii : their variously recorded history to the present time, 1909
