= Germantown (Quincy, Massachusetts) =

Coordinates: 42.251°N 70.965°W

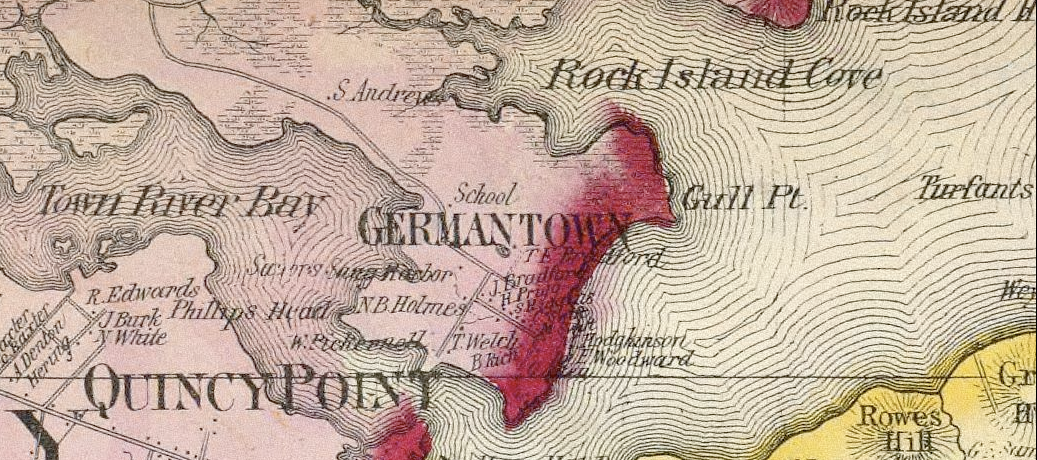
Map showing Germantown neighborhood in 1858.

Germantown is a primarily residential neighborhood in the city of Quincy, Massachusetts. The neighborhood is located on a peninsula surrounded by Town River bay on the west and Rock Island Cove on the east. This peninsula was known since the 1640s as “Shed's Neck”.

== History ==
Palmer Street, the main thoroughfare of the neighborhood, was named for General Joseph Palmer. In 1752, Palmer and Richard Cranch, brother-in-law of John Adams and father of American jurist William Cranch, were held by tenure of lease by a company interested in German immigration to create a planned manufacturing community. The land was to be settled in the 1750s by a group of glassmakers and weavers from Germany. The planned community had failed by 1760, but the name has remained. Many of the Germans who originally settled in Germantown eventually left. Some went to Waldoboro, Maine, as indentured servants.

By the late 18th century, ship building became the major industry because of the ideal location of the neighborhood. In 1861, a ferry service was established between Germantown and Quincy Point.

== Community facilities ==
The tallest building in the neighborhood is the seven-story O'Brien Towers. Most children in Germantown go to Snug Harbor for elementary school, Broad Meadows for middle school, and Quincy High for high school. Snug Harbor is the only school actually within the neighborhood. The neighborhood has a small general store (Palmer Street Market, also known as the Blue Store or Lester’s, as locals call it ). In 2007, the city opened the Germantown Neighborhood Center in the former St. Boniface Church for use in a variety of neighborhood educational and community functions.

== Demographics ==
The neighborhood roughly corresponds to census tract 4178.02. At the 2020 census, the population of the neighborhood was 3,217. Of the total population, 43.15% self-identified as white, 8.83% as black, 0.19% as Native American, 37.30% as Asian, 2.67% as some other race, and 7.86% as having two or more races. Of the total population of any race, 7.55% identified as being of Hispanic origin.
