= Nathaniel Peabody (Boston) =

American physician (1774–1855)

- Born: March 30, 1774; Topsfield, Massachusetts
- Died: January 1, 1855 (aged 80); Perth Amboy, New Jersey
- Occupations: Physician and dentist
- Known for: Homeopathic physician, early dentist, and father of Elizabeth, Maria, and Sophia Peabody
- Spouse: Elizabeth (Eliza) Palmer Peabody
- Children: Elizabeth Palmer Peabody; Mary Tyler Peabody Mann; Sophia Amelia Peabody Hawthorne; Nathaniel Peabody; George Francis Peabody; Wellington Peabody

Nathaniel Peabody (March 30, 1774 – January 1, 1855) was an American medical doctor and dentist from Boston and Salem, Massachusetts, having studied at Dartmouth College in the class of 1800. Peabody was described as an "experimentally minded doctor and dentist". He began his medical practice using "heroic" practices of large amounts of emetic and purgative medicines. For instance, a patient could become very sick or die from mercury poisoning of a purgative called calomel. Upon becoming familiar with the work of Dr. Samuel Hahnemann, Peabody used botanical medicines in small doses to treat his patients, which reduced the side effects and potential death from the heroic practices.

Dentistry was a relatively new field when Peabody became a dentist. He wrote the book The Art of Preserving Teeth in 1824 and in the 1830s he used hypnosis as a pain management technique for teeth extractions.

He was father of three intellectual women: Elizabeth Palmer Peabody, Mary Tyler Peabody Mann, and Sophia Amelia Peabody Hawthorne.

== Early life ==
Nathaniel Peabody was born in 1774 in Topsfield, Massachusetts, the second of eight children born to Mary Potter Peabody and Isaac Peabody, an illiterate tailor. He was descended from John Paybody of Plymouth of 1635, and in early Massachusetts records, the name of these ancestors was often spelled Pabodie. Nathaniel Peabody was a member of one of the prominent families known as the Boston Brahmins. Of his siblings, all but John remained in New Hampshire. Captain John Peabody was a sailor who lived between voyages with his family in Salem, Massachusetts.

From the age of nine, he grew up in New Boston, New Hampshire, where his father established a farm. Peabody helped clear the land and labored on the house, starting with the stonework for the cellar. Peabody planned to get an education so that he was not held down by a life as a poor farmer in New Hampshire like his father, and later siblings. It is unknown how he was schooled in his boyhood to be accepted by an academy and to pay tuition, but Peabody attended Atkinson Academy in Atkinson, New Hampshire operated by Rev. Stephen Peabody. At the school, he gained the reputation of being a man of good character and intelligence. Peabody attended Dartmouth College and was a member of Phi Beta Kappa. He graduated in 1800.

== Andover and Billerica ==
Peabody met Elizabeth (Eliza) Palmer, the granddaughter of Joseph Palmer, a general during the American Revolutionary War, in early 1800 while he was still at Dartmouth. Eliza encouraged their relationship through letter-writing, sharing her poetry with him, mending his clothes, and giving him handmade gifts. A few residents of Andover, Massachusetts, founded a co-educational school, North Parish School, and Rev. Stephen Peabody hired Peabody to teach the boys and Eliza to teach the girls beginning January 1801. Eliza's health deteriorated due to the workload of preparing for and teaching classes and the strain from rumors about the two teachers. She went to the home of her aunt Elizabeth Palmer Cranch in Milton for a couple of months to recuperate and returned to the school in Andover in the summer of 1802.

Peabody and Eliza were married on November 2, 1802 in Andover. Eliza realized that her husband had a hard time adjusting to a life off of the farm and what she called his "constitutional timidity" meant that he had a hard time living up to the educational progress that he had made at the academy.

In their first year of marriage, Eliza took in her youngest brother George (14) and sister Catherine (11) and opened a boardinghouse for students. In April 1804, the couple moved to Billerica, where Peobody was an apprentice to Dr. Pemberton to become a physician. They lived on a farm, where Eliza opened a school. The Peabodys had their first daughter one month after the move.

== Cambridge and Lynn ==
In 1806, the Peobody's moved to Cambridge, Massachusetts, to further Peabody's medical career. He was an apprentice to Dr. John Jeffries, a well-educated physician and attended lectures at Harvard Medical School. Eliza gave birth to Mary and she taught a few children in their home. One year later, the family moved to Lynn, Massachusetts, where Peabody practiced medicine and Eliza was director of a girl's academy, which became difficult to do while also taking care of her daughters.

== Salem ==
In May 1808, the Peabodys moved to Salem, Massachusetts, where wealthy families were potential clients for Peabody's medical practice and Eliza's school. Eliza had entry into society as a member of an intellectual family and granddaughter of General Joseph Palmer of the American Revolution. Salem was a port town with "sleek sailing ships", brick mansions, wealthy merchants, and the Salem Athenaeum library. Unfortunately, the Embargo Act of 1807 against France and England stopped most sailing voyages from Salem and reduced revenues for merchants.

The family lived predominantly in Salem from 1808 to 1840, with two years in Lancaster, Massachusetts from 1820 to 1822 and in Boston from 1828 to 1840. Peabody's brother Captain John Peabody, married in 1807 to Elizabeth Manning, lived in Salem. They spent time together, enjoying their growing families and supporting one another. John loaned Peabody money as he built his medical practice. When John was sailing for months at a time, Peabody looked in on his wife.

Eliza operated a school and boarding house for girls out of the family's row house along Union Street. She engaged young women who received an education and a place to live in exchange for their domestic work. In 1817 and 1818, Peabody sat on the Salem School Committee. In 1834, he managed the Salem Lyceum.

=== Medical practice ===
In 1811, Peabody became a member of the Massachusetts Medical Society. Although he had not attained a medical degree, he may have been accepted due to his training under Dr. John Jeffries and having five years experience in his medical practice. Peabody was the secretary for the Medical Society in 1817. In the 1820s, Peabody adopted homeopathic medical practices of Dr. Samuel Hahnemann of Germany. Rather than leaning on emetics and purgatives that were considered "heroic" practices, Peabody adopted the use sassafras, belladonna, henbane, horehound, aconite, and snake venom to treat patients. The medicines were administered in small doses so that patients did not have the ill effects and potential deaths from large doses of medicine used in heroic practice.

=== Dental practice ===
Peabody also worked in the relatively new practice of dentistry, experimenting with new dental practices. While the family lived in Boston, Peabody kept a dental office in Salem. Peabody published the book, The Art of Preserving Teeth, in 1824. In the 1830s, Peabody used hypnosis as a pain management technique for extractions. By 1837, Peabody had a dental practice and lived on Charter Street, near the Charter Street Burying Point (now in the Charter Street Historic District).

== Boston ==
The family moved to Boston in 1840, living on West Street near Boston Common. Peabody practiced medicine and his children pursued their own careers in homeopathic drugs, book sales and publishing, and art.

== Family life ==
The Peabodys were a two-income family. Peabody was an apothecary, doctor, and dentist. Eliza advocated for preschool child education and taught school. Eliza believed in the value of educated women, generally and as mothers. She said "the fate of our Country, is in some degree dependent, upon the education of its females."

They had three daughters, all intellectual women: Elizabeth Palmer Peabody, Mary Tyler Peabody Mann, and Sophia Amelia Peabody Hawthorne. They had three sons, Nathaniel, George Francis, and Wellington Peabody. George and Wellington died in their twenties. Wellington studied medicine in New Orleans when he contracted and died of yellow fever in September 1837. George contracted spinal tuberculosis and was bedridden for two years before he died in November 1839 at the Peabody house in Salem. Nathaniel sold homeopathic medicine to support his wife and children in the 1840s. Later, Nathaniel relied on his sister Elizabeth for his livelihood.

Sophia's husband, Nathaniel Hawthorne wrote "Rappaccini's Daughter", a short story in 1844. There are several theories about who Hawthorne modeled Rappaccinni, who poisoned his daughter, after. One theory is that Rappaccini was modeled after Peabody. Sophia suffered from teething as a baby and later from migraine headaches. She was said to have been treated by Peabody with his experimental regime of homeopathic medicine that was poisonous. One of the medicines he administered to her was calomel, a purgative containing mercury that could cause sickness or death. She was treated by other physicians in the 1820s with quinine, arsenic, and other medicines.

== Death ==
Eliza died in January 1853. Peabody died on January 1, 1855, in Perth Amboy, New Jersey.

== Bibliography ==
- Cook, Jonathan A. (2005). "The Biographical Background to "Rappaccini's Daughter"". Nathaniel Hawthorne Review. 31 (2): 34–73. ISSN 0890-4197.
- Gordan, John D. (1954). Nathaniel Hawthorne, the years of fulfilment, 1804-1853, an exhibition from the Berg collection, first editions, manuscripts, autograph letters. [Catalogue.] By John D. Gordan. New York: New York Public Library.
- Marshall, Megan (2005). The Peabody sisters : three women who ignited American romanticism. Boston: Houghton Mifflin. ISBN 978-0-395-38992-8.
- Seavey, Lura Rogers (2004). "Elizabeth Palmer Peabody". More Than Petticoats: Remarkable Massachusetts Women. Twodot. ISBN 978-0-7627-2599-1.
