= Platydesma =

Formerly recognized genus of plants

Platydesma is a formerly recognized genus of plants in family Rutaceae. Evidence from 2009 indicated that Platydesma is nested within the genus Melicope and is sister to all Hawaiian Melicope species, and it is now placed within that genus. The other Melicope species are dioecious (individual plants only bear either male or female flowers), whereas the flowers of species formerly placed in Platydesma are hermaphroditic, suggesting a rare evolutionary reversion away from dioecy. Species included:

- Platydesma remyi → Melicope remyi
- Platydesma rostrata → Melicope rostrata
