= Post riders =

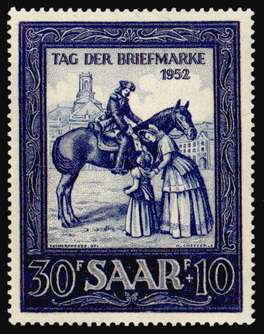
Post rider shown on postage stamp of Saarland

Post riders or postriders describes a horse and rider postal delivery system that existed at various times and various places throughout history. The term is usually reserved for instances where a network of regularly scheduled service was provided under some degree of central management by the State or State licensed monopoly.

These networks included predefined routes known as post roads complete with distance markers and waypoints. Unlike other forms of mounted courier, post riders collected and delivered mail over the course of their route, meeting with other riders at scheduled times and scheduled places to exchange forwarded items. In this way correspondence could pass reliably from rider to rider and cover a considerable distance in a reasonable time at reduced cost.

While some integration with local postal services in larger centers occurred, by and large the post riders were a separate entity under separate management and tariff structure.

== History ==
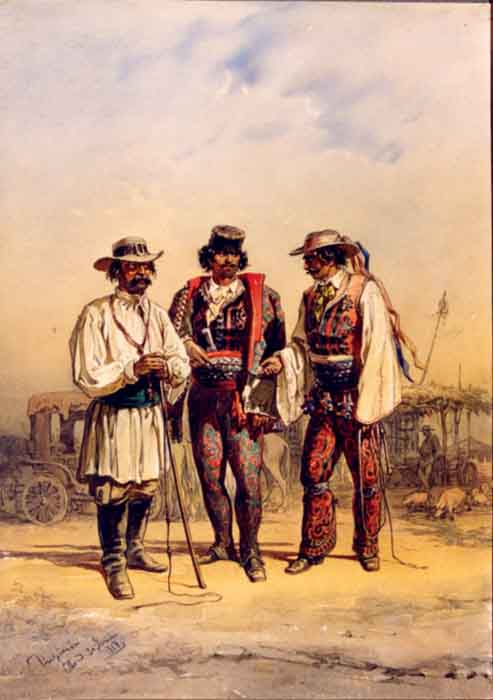
Cabbies in their brightly coloured outfit, in Bucharest, around 1868. The cabbies foul language, curt features and fiery temper, have become a motif in Romanian proverbs.

While relay rider networks were a common feature of every ancient empire, these were primarily for the exclusive use of the government or military and carried no civil correspondence as a rule. What differentiated postriders from these earlier efforts was that they were open to the public and created for the public convenience. The other distinguishing feature was that post riders operated on a schedule.

=== The Hanseatic League ===
While in the case of the post riders the shift from royal messenger to public courier must be seen as evolutionary, there were some notable early examples. The Hanseatic League had a regular mounted service as early as the year 1274 between the principal towns of the League as well as the fortified castles which protected the merchants in their commerce. Business and diplomatic messages were handled by the service equally. Well organised, it had its own post-horses that were used exclusively for the letter service; at each stop the time of the receipt and dispatch of the post-bag was written upon the face of each letter.

=== The Holy Roman Empire ===
On behalf of the far-flung Habsburg dynasty, of The Holy Roman Empire, Franz von Taxis set up a courier network that grew to cover all of Western Europe by the middle of the 16th century. Permanent post stations were built about a day's journey apart. Over time, these stations became important economic centers: They were meeting places, inns and public rooms, trade centers and stables. Post stations became important centers for the development of villages and cities. While not solely used for government traffic, private use of this service required a licence from the State.

=== Elizabethan England ===
It was in England, during the Elizabethan period where the post rider truly began to serve all comers almost in spite of the declared restrictive policy of the Government as regards their public use. Merchants and farmers, constables and innkeepers, soldiers and sailors were using the postal system, attesting to the remarkable standard of literacy of the ordinary people.

A huge number of horses were involved in this operation as each stage was only about 10 miles, after which a fresh horse was used. In most cases the horses were kept at inns or hostelries. There was also for the first time, a system of post roads although the original usage referred more to the fixed routes of the service than the thoroughfares themselves.

=== The American Colonies ===
In the American Colonies postal routes were farmed out to contractors who promised to deliver the mail within a certain area for a set length of time. When mail was first delivered to a town, the townspeople would have to come to a central location, usually the general store, to pick up the mail. It was in the New World that the post riders would provide the longest and most complete service before being eliminated by other forms of transport.

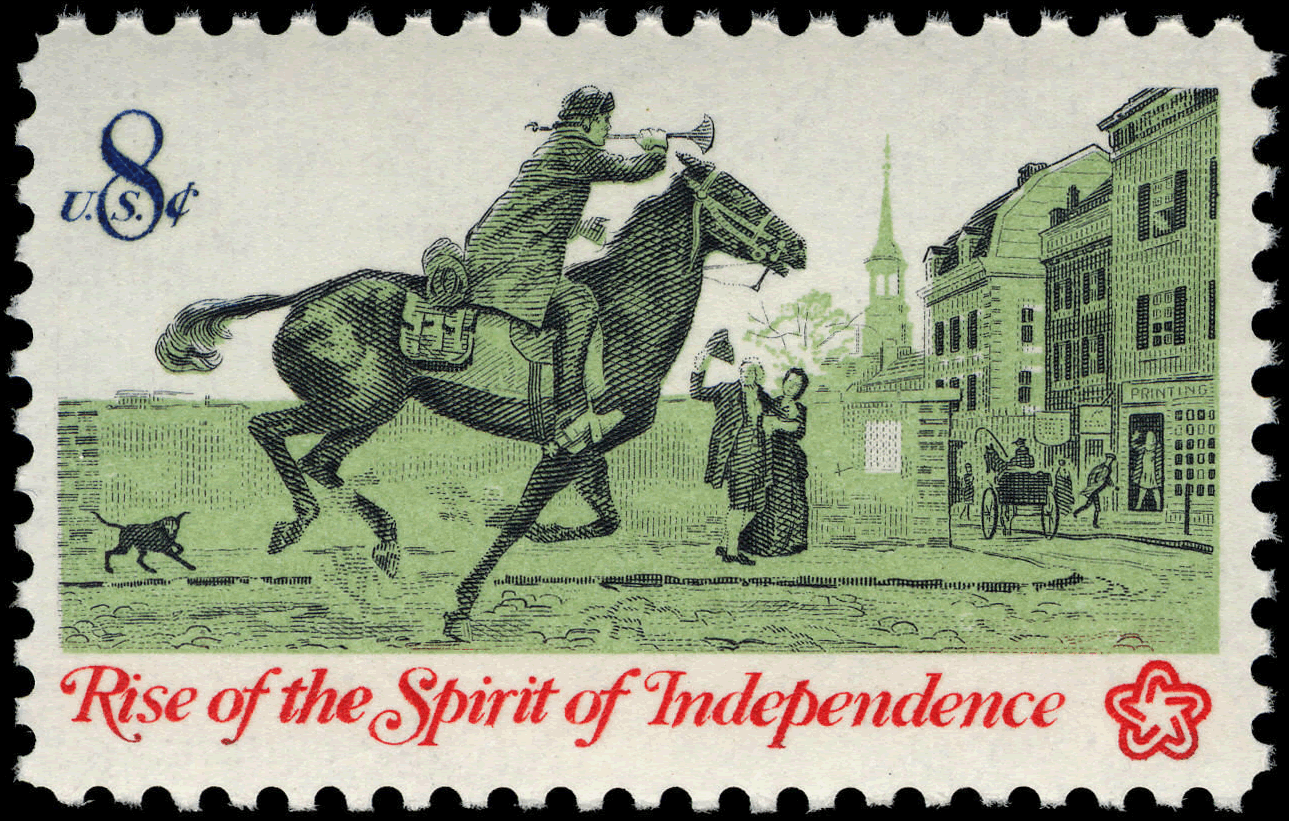
Post rider shown on a 1973 USPS issue for the US Bicentennial

In 1780 the system consisted of only of a Postmaster General, a Secretary/Comptroller, three surveyors, one Inspector of Dead Letters, 26 post riders, 75 post offices and about 2,000 miles of post roads. Postmasters and post riders were exempt from military duties so as not to interrupt service. These post-riders were allowed the exclusive privilege of carrying letters, papers and packages on their respective routes, and any person who infringed upon their rights was subject to a fine. The post riders had to make good time, specified clearly, and milestones came into their own to measure progress.

Significant early legislation that affected the post riders included an act of the United States Congress in 1838 that declared that all railroads in the United States were post roads. The act had a twofold effect: it increased the use of railroads to transmit the mails and limited the use of post riders to postal districts that were not on railway routes. In those areas of the country that were not on railroad routes, mail was carried by contractors, and the transportation of mail by any means other than by water or railroad was called a star route service.

== Operations ==
A typical schedule taken from The Virginia Gazette, March 21, 1766 shows an example of the type of service the post riders provided:

"THE publick is hereby desired to take notice that the Hampton rider will arrive in Williamsburg every Tuesday and Saturday at noon, come through York town, and return to Hampton the same evening. That the Hanover rider will set off from Hanover town early every Monday and Friday, to meet the Hampton rider in Williamsburg at noon every Tuesday and Saturday, and return to Hanover town on the Wednesday and Sunday nights. That the James river rider will set off from Hanover town, by the way of Richmond and Warwick, to Petersburg and Blandford, and return to Hanover town on Tuesday and Saturday nights. That the Fredericksburg rider will set out every Monday morning from Hanover town, by the way of Todd's bridge, and arrive at Fredericksburg on Tuesday night, where he exchanges mails with the Northern rider, and returns to Hanover town every Thursday. That a rider will set off from Fredericksburg every Wednesday, to be at Hobb's Hole that night, where he exchanges mails with a rider from Urbanna, and returns to Fredericksburg on Thursday night. And that on Friday morning a rider proceeds with the mail to the Northward.

John Dixon, D. Postmaster."

== See also ==
- Boston Post Road
- Bicycle messenger
- Mail delivery by animal
- Pony Express
- Portmanteau (mail)
- Yam (route)

== Sources ==
- Cady, Priscilla Scott (1999). The English Royal Messengers Service, 1685-1750 : an institutional study. Lewiston, NY: Edwin Mellen Press. p. 149. ISBN 0-7734-7977-5.
- Hill, Mary C. (1994). The King's messengers 1199-1377 : a list of all known messengers, mounted and unmounted, who served John, Henry III, and the first three Edwards. Dover, DE: Alan Sutton Publishing. p. 195. ISBN 0-7509-0764-9.
- Walker, George (1938). Haste, Post, Haste! Postmen and Post-roads through the Ages. London: G.G. Harrap. p. 274.
