= Joseph Hawley (Massachusetts politician) =

American politician (1723–1788)

Member of Massachusetts Provisional Congress
- In office 1774–1776

Personal details
- Born: October 8, 1723
- Died: March 10, 1788 (aged 64)
- Education: Yale College

Joseph Hawley III (October 8, 1723 – March 10, 1788) was a political leader from Massachusetts during the era of the American Revolution.

Joseph Hawley III was born in Northampton, Massachusetts, a son of Joseph Hawley II (28 August 1682 - 1 June 1735) and Rebekah Stoddard (d. 1766), the daughter of Solomon Stoddard (1643-1729). Stoddard, a minister who held the pulpit of Northampton's First Congregational Church for sixty years, was succeeded in his pulpit by his grandson, Jonathan Edwards (1703-1758). Thus, Joseph Hawley III was a first cousin to Jonathan Edwards. Through his sermons and ministry, Edwards led his congregation in an early manifestation of the First Great Awakening in 1734-1735. Joseph's father Joseph Hawley II, in deep distress over the perceived depth of his own sinfulness, committed suicide in 1735 when Joseph III was eleven years old, which Edwards publicly attributed to the work of Satan and the Hawley family’s history of mental illness, described as "melancholy".

Joseph Hawley III graduated from Yale College in 1742 (he studied theology), and served as a Captain in a Massachusetts regiment during the 1745 Louisbourg expedition. He studied law under Phineas Lyman, and began practicing in 1749. He served in a variety of public offices, and was first elected to the Massachusetts House of Representatives in 1751.

Hawley was active in getting Jonathan Edwards dismissed from his position as pastor of the Northampton church.

During the Stamp Act crisis he emerged, with Samuel Adams and James Otis Jr., as a leader of the popular (or Whig) party. He declined election to the First Continental Congress in 1774, but was an active leader of the Massachusetts Provincial Congress. He urged Massachusetts's delegates to the Second Continental Congress to issue the United States Declaration of Independence. He suffered a nervous breakdown in 1776 and never again served in the legislature, but he continued to write important political essays. He was charter member of the American Academy of Arts and Sciences in 1780.

Joseph Hawley is the namesake of the town of Hawley, Massachusetts.
