= Minot Pratt =

Printer and founder, director and head farmer of the Brook Farm experimental community

- Born: January 8, 1805; Weymouth, Massachusetts, US
- Died: March 29, 1878 (aged 73); Concord, Massachusetts, US
- Occupation: farmer
- Known for: a founder, director and head farmer of Brook Farm; friend of the noted Concord, Massachusetts authors; father of John Bridge Pratt
- Spouse: Maria Jones Bridge (m. 1830)
- Children: Henry Minot Pratt; Frederick Gray Pratt; John Bridge Pratt; Caroline Hayden Pratt; Theodore Parker Pratt
- Relatives: Anna Alcott Pratt (daughter-in-law), Alvin Adams (brother-in-law of wife)

Minot Pratt (1805–1878) was a founder, a director and head farmer of the Brook Farm experimental community, a printer, a friend of noted Concord, Massachusetts, writers, Henry David Thoreau, Amos Bronson Alcott, Louisa May Alcott, Ralph Waldo Emerson, and Nathaniel Hawthorne, and a naturalist in Concord, Massachusetts. At his death in 1878 it was written of him: “his recreation, and one might say, his worship, was among the wild-flowers and woodlands, which he knew almost as familiarly as Thoreau did. Thoreau was a ‘poet-naturalist,’ Minot Pratt was a farmer-naturalist, -- but in both the love of nature was far stronger than the mere scientific thirst for knowledge. They revered nature and treated her with the modesty due to a maiden, and with the respect of a young lover. This sentiment did not wither as age came on.”

== Early life ==
Minot Pratt was born on January 8, 1805, in Weymouth, Massachusetts, to Bela Pratt (1777–1843), a stonemason, and his wife, Sophia (Lyon) Pratt (1780–1841). As a teenager Minot journeyed to New Bedford, Massachusetts, to learn the printing trade, and then to Boston, Massachusetts, where he became the printer for The Christian Register in 1827. In 1829 he married Maria Jones Bridge (1806–1891) of Chelsea, Massachusetts. The ceremony was performed by Ralph Waldo Emerson, said to be his first marriage ceremony performed. Maria's sister, Rebecca Bridge married Alvin Adams who founded the company that became the Adams Express Company (now Adams Funds).

== Brook Farm ==
In 1841 Minot Pratt and his wife Maria joined George Ripley, Nathaniel Hawthorne and others to form the experimental community in West Roxbury, Massachusetts, called Brook Farm. Minot became its head farmer, although he had no farming experience. He was consulted by Ripley on many matters for the running of the farm and served at different times as a director of agriculture and as a trustee of the community. He was reported by fellow members to have been one of the most valued of the community not only for his farming abilities, but also for his management skills. In April 1845 Minot and his family withdrew from Brook Farm and moved to Concord, Massachusetts, where they purchased a farm and where he lived the rest of his days.

== Concord Years ==
Minot Pratt was a founding member of the Concord Farmers' Club for which he served as president and for 16 years as secretary. Minot wrote a number of articles on farming for the club and for newspapers such as The Commonwealth (weekly Boston, Massachusetts, newspaper, 1862–1896), sometimes anonymously. Minot's interest in wildflowers was evident at Brook Farm and became more significant in Concord, an interest he shared with Henry David Thoreau, who became his friend. This pursuit led Minot to compile a detailed floral list using scientific names for the town of Concord which was left to the town as a manuscript at the time he died. Richard J. Eaton in his A Flora of Concord (1974) summarizes Minot's life and evaluates his botanical expertise, noting that he “played an important role in stimulating his more scientifically minded contemporaries and successors” and that his extensive floral list contained only “a few mistakes.” On October 30, 1859 Henry Thoreau gave an impassioned speech to the town of Concord defending John Brown which Minot reported vividly the same night in a letter to his wife (who was visiting her parents) and which Walter Harding reproduced in part in his The Days of Henry Thoreau (1982). In 1860 one of Minot's sons, John Bridge Pratt, married Anna Alcott Pratt, the eldest daughter of Minot's friend Amos Bronson Alcott.

== Death ==
Minot Pratt died on March 29, 1878. Louisa May Alcott wrote a poem for Minot's funeral. At the time of his death an obituary appeared not only in The Concord Freeman but also in the regional newspapers, The Springfield Daily Republican and The New England Farmer, and Horticultural Register
