= Orchard House =

Historic house in Massachusetts, United States

- U.S. National Register of Historic Places
- U.S. National Historic Landmark
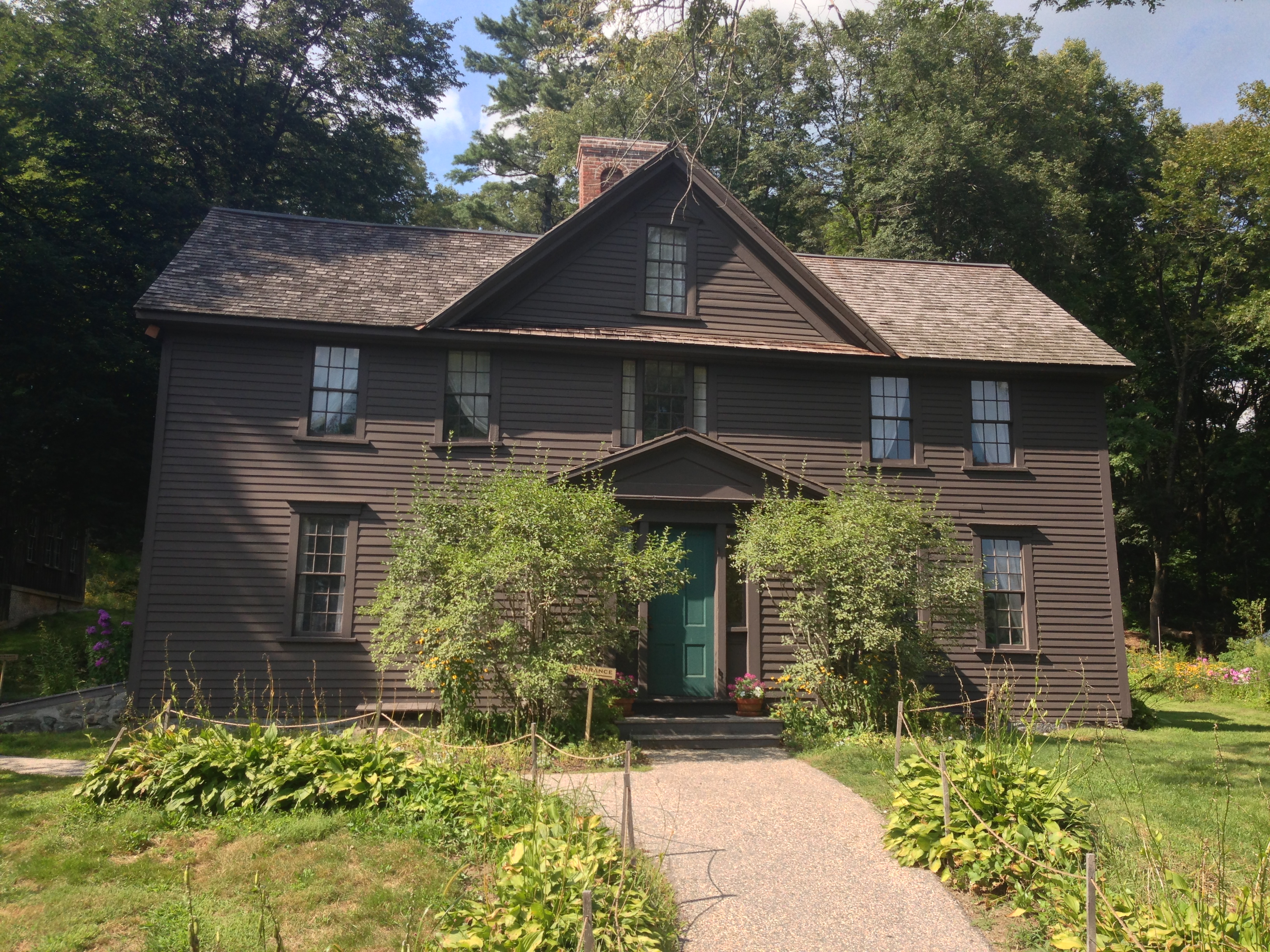
- Orchard House, summer 2013
- Location: 399 Lexington Road, Concord, Massachusetts, U.S.
- Coordinates: 42.4589°N 71.3351°W
- Built: c. 1700–1710
- NRHP reference No.: 66000781

Significant dates
- Added to NRHP: October 15, 1966
- Designated NHL: December 29, 1962

Orchard House is a historic house museum in Concord, Massachusetts, United States, opened to the public on May 27, 1912. It was the longtime home of Amos Bronson Alcott (1799–1888) and his family, including his daughter Louisa May Alcott (1832–1888), who wrote and set her novel Little Women (1868–69) there.

The four daughters—Anna (the oldest), Louisa (one year younger), Elizabeth (three years younger than Louisa), and Abigail (the youngest, five years younger than Elizabeth)—lived in Orchard House from 1858 to 1877.

== History ==
The house was first built sometime between 1690 and 1720. The Alcotts had first moved to Concord in 1840, although they left in 1843 to start Fruitlands, a utopian agrarian commune in nearby Harvard. The family returned in 1845 and purchased a house named "Hillside," but left again in 1852, selling to Nathaniel Hawthorne, who renamed it The Wayside.

The Alcotts returned to Concord once again in 1857. They moved into Orchard House—which was then a two-story clapboard farmhouse—in the spring of 1858. At the time of purchase the site included two early eighteenth-century houses on a 12-acre (49,000m^{2}) apple orchard. Consequently, the Alcotts named the property "Orchard House." Initially, Orchard house was too dilapidated for them to move in immediately. The Alcotts stayed in a house on Bedford Street while repairs were being made. "'Tis a pretty retreat," Bronson Alcott wrote soon after moving in, "and ours; a family mansion to take pride in, rescued as it is from deformity and disgrace."

Bronson Alcott made significant changes to the building. He installed alcoves for busts retrieved from his failed Temple School, repaired the staircase, installed bookcases, constructed a back studio for his youngest daughter May's artwork, and installed a rustic fence around the property. He also moved a smaller tenant house to adjoin the rear of the main house, making a single larger structure. While the home was being renovated, the family rented rooms next door at The Wayside while the Hawthornes were living in England. Later, Lydia Maria Child visited the house and recorded her thoughts: "The result is a house full of queer nooks and corners and all manner of juttings in and out. It seems as if the spirit of some old architect had brought it from the Middle Ages and dropped it down in Concord...The whole house leaves a general impression of harmony, of a medieval sort."

Orchard House is adjacent to The Wayside on the historic "American Mile" roadway toward Lexington, and is less than a half-mile from Bush, the home of Ralph Waldo Emerson, where Henry David Thoreau and the Alcotts were frequent visitors.

== The Alcotts in Residence ==
Orchard House was the most permanent home of the Alcotts, with the family in residence from 1858 to 1877. During this period, the family included Bronson, his wife Abigail May, and their daughters Anna, Louisa, and May. Elizabeth, the model for Beth March, had died in March 1858, just weeks before the family moved in.

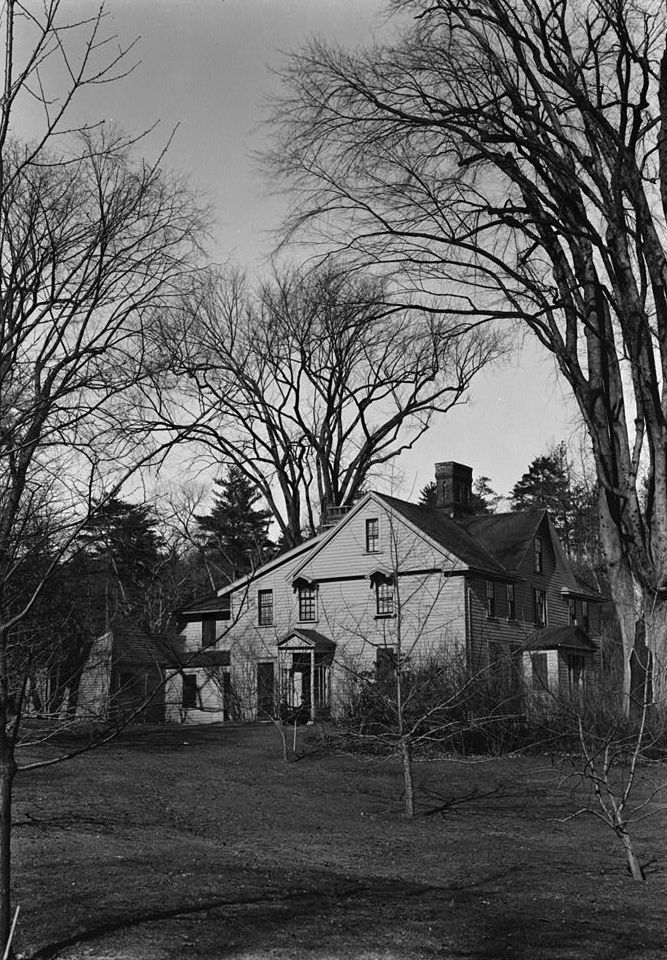
Orchard House, 1941

The Alcott girls befriended the Hawthorne children, who lived next door, though Nathaniel Hawthorne himself was elusive. Bronson Alcott was disappointed, and recorded: "Nobody gets a chance to speak with him unless by accident." However, he added, "Still he has a tender kindly side, and a voice that a woman might own, the hesitance is so taking, and the tones so remote from what you expected."

The Alcotts were vegetarians, and harvested fruits and vegetables from the gardens and orchard on the property. Conversations about abolitionism, women's suffrage, and social reform were often held around the dining room table. The family performed theatricals using the dining room as their stage while guests watched from the adjoining parlor.

The parlor was a formal room with arched niches built by Bronson to display busts of his favorite philosophers, Socrates and Plato. On May 23, 1860, Anna married John Bridge Pratt in this room.

The youngest daughter, May, was a talented artist. Her bedroom contains sketches of angelic, mythological, and biblical figures on the woodwork and doors. In Louisa's room, May painted a panel of calla lilies, as well as an owl on the fireplace. Copies of Turner landscapes by May adorn various rooms in Orchard House.

In 1868, Louisa May Alcott wrote her beloved classic novel, Little Women, in her room on a special "shelf desk" built by her father. Set within the house, its characters are based on members of her family, with the plot loosely based on the family's earlier years and events that transpired at The Wayside. Also written in the house were Bronson Alcott's Ralph Waldo Emerson (1865; published 1882), Tablets (1868), Concord Days (1872), and Table Talk (1877).

On the grounds to the west of the house is a structure designed and built by Bronson Alcott originally known as "Hillside Chapel," and later as "The Concord School of Philosophy." Operating from 1879 to 1888, the School was one of the first highly successful adult education centers in the country.

In 1877, Louisa May Alcott bought a home on Main Street for her sister Anna. After Mrs. Alcott's death in the same year, Louisa and her father moved into the home as well. The Alcott family were officially moved out of Orchard House by November 14. Orchard House was then sold to long-time family friend William Torrey Harris in 1884. Alcott said that she's "glad to be done with it, though after living in it for 25 years it is full of memories. But places have not much hold on me when the persons who made them dear are gone."

== Orchard House today ==
Orchard House is open for guided tours daily, with the exceptions of Easter, Thanksgiving, Christmas, and January 1 and 2. An admission fee is charged.

External videos
- Tour of Orchard House, June 19, 2017, C-SPAN

The exterior looks much as it did in the Alcotts' day. Care has been taken to keep extensive structural preservation work invisible. All of the furnishings are original to the mid-nineteenth century—with roughly 75% belonging to the Alcott family—and the rooms look very much as they did when the Alcotts were in residence.

The Hillside Chapel

The dining room contains family china, portraits of the family members, and paintings by May, along with period furnishings. The parlor is decorated with period wallpaper and a patterned reproduction carpet, while family portraits and watercolors by May adorn the walls. Abigail May's bread board, mortar and pestle, tin spice chest, and wooden bowls are displayed on the hutch table in the kitchen. Other original kitchen features include a laundry drying rack designed by Bronson and a soapstone sink bought by Louisa. The study is furnished with Bronson's library table, chair, and desk. The parents' bedroom contains many of Abigail May's possessions, including photographs, furniture, and handmade quilts.

Orchard House has continued the tradition of Mr. Alcott's Concord School of Philosophy by hosting "The Summer Conversational Series" since 1977, and has recently added a "Teacher Institute" component. The Hillside Chapel is also used for youth programs, poetry readings, historical reenactments, and other special events.

== See also ==
- Transcendentalism
- List of historic houses in Massachusetts
- List of National Historic Landmarks in Massachusetts
- National Register of Historic Places listings in Concord, Massachusetts
