= Crawford Path =

Hiking trail in the White Mountains of New Hampshire

Coordinates: 44°13′22″N 71°23′52″W

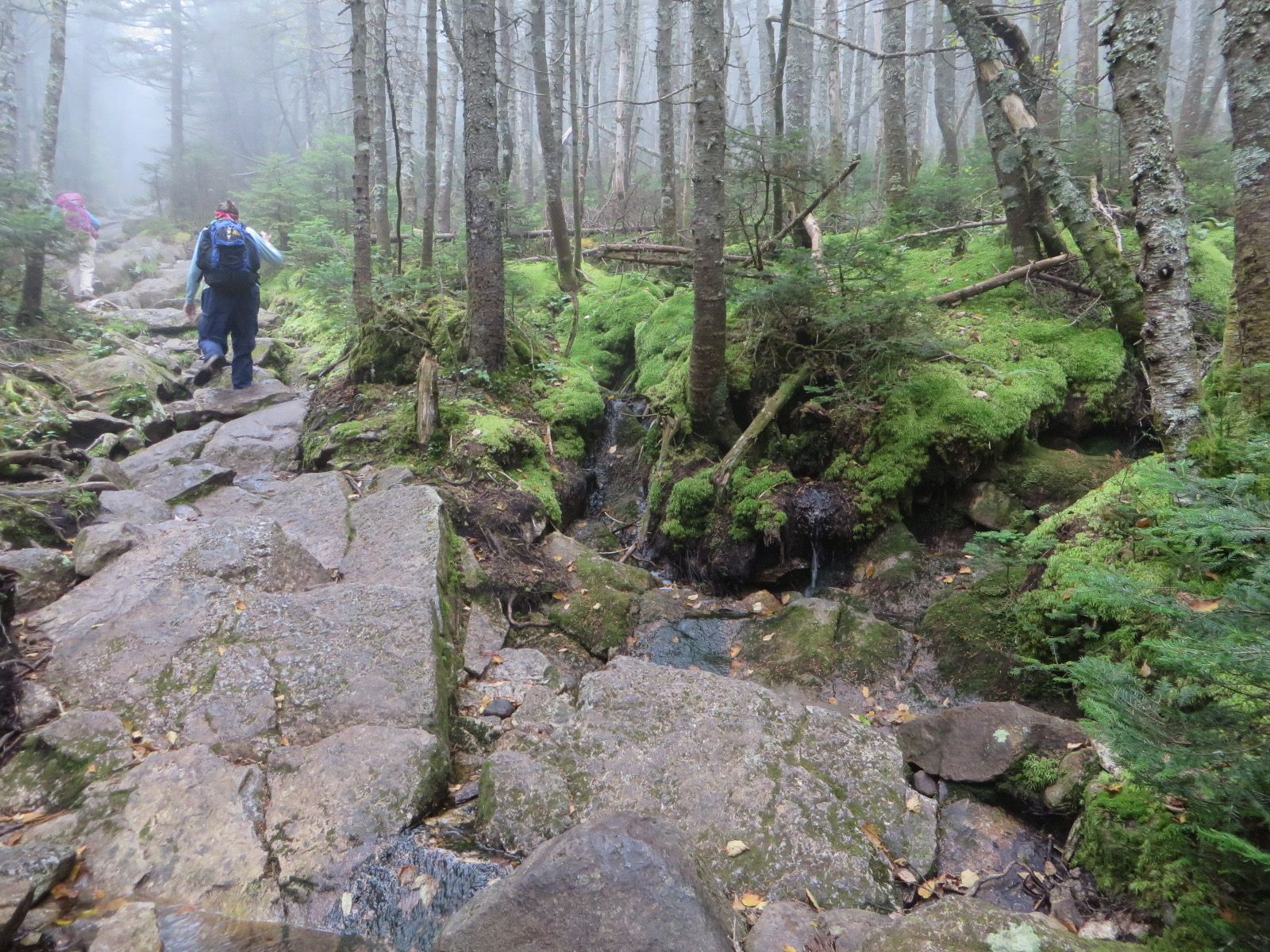
The Crawford Path ascending Mount Pierce, September 2014

The Crawford Path is an 8.5-mile-long (13.7 km) hiking trail in the White Mountains of New Hampshire that is considered to be the United States' oldest continuously maintained hiking trail. It travels from Crawford Notch to the summit of Mount Washington (Agiocochook). The first iteration of the Crawford Path was cut in 1819 by Ethan Allen Crawford and his father, Abel Crawford. The trail ascends a cumulative 4,900 feet (1,500 m), first through densely wooded forest for about 3.1 miles (5.0 km), then following the exposed southern ridge of the Presidential Range mostly above the treeline.

The Crawford Path is a popular hiking trail. The primary parking lot for hikers is off Mt. Clinton Road, 0.1 miles from U.S. Route 302. Using short loop trails, either off of or paralleling Crawford Path, the summits of Mt. Pierce, Mt. Eisenhower, and Mt. Monroe can be reached. The Crawford Path also passes the Appalachian Mountain Club's Lakes of the Clouds hut, one of their High Huts of the White Mountains. The Crawford Path is part of the Appalachian Trail from their junction north of Mt. Pierce to the summit of Mt. Washington.

== History ==
A brief history of Crawford Path:

- 1784 - A geology party headed by Manasseh Cutler named Mount Washington.
- 1790s - The Crawford family moved to New Hampshire's White Mountains from Guildhall, Vermont.
- 1819 - Ethan Allen Crawford and his father, Abel, cut the first iteration of the Crawford Path, an 8.5-mile trail from the valley where they lived (then called White Mountain Notch, now called Crawford Notch) to Mount Washington's summit.
- 1819 - Abel Crawford led the first recorded guided hike up the new Crawford Path on September 9, 1819. Included in this group of college students, mostly from Harvard Divinity School, were Samuel Joseph May, George B. Emerson, Samuel E. Sewall, Caleb Cushing, Joseph Coolidge, William Ware and Joseph G. Moody.
- 1820 - Ethan Allen led the second expedition along the Crawford Path to the summit of Mt. Washington on July 31, 1820. This group of distinguished citizens from nearby Lancaster, New Hampshire, named many of the mountains in the Presidential Range during this excursion. Among those in this group were John Wingate Weeks, treasurer of Coos County and a U.S. congressman, Adino Nye Brackett, clerk of the Superior Court, General John Wilson, and Philip Carrigain, the New Hampshire Secretary of State.
- 1821 - Ethan Allen Crawford built a house on the summit of Mount Washington, which lasted until a storm in 1826.
- 1840 - Thomas J. Crawford, a younger son of Abel, converted the path to an equestrian route.
- Early twentieth century - Hikers dominated use of Crawford Path over equestrian activity.
- 1994 - The Crawford Path was designated a National Recreation Trail on its 175th anniversary by the U.S. Forest Service.

It is believed that the trail mostly follows the original path, except for a section between the summit of Mount Monroe and Mount Washington, which was diverted from the original path off the ridge to go by AMC's Lakes of the Clouds hut.
