= Alvin Adams =

American businessman (1804–1877)

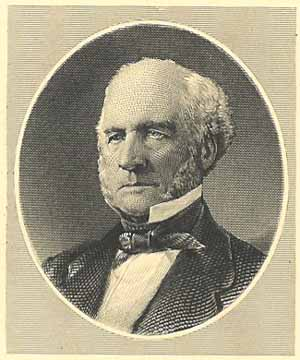
- Born: June 16, 1804; Andover, Vermont
- Died: September 1, 1877 (aged 73); Watertown, Massachusetts
- Citizenship: American
- Occupation: businessperson
- Known for: founder of Adams and Company
- Spouse: Anne Rebecca Bridge (m. 1831; died 1882)

Alvin Hoar Adams (June 16, 1804 – September 1, 1877) was the founder of Adams and Company, a forerunner to Adams Express, one of the first companies to act as a carrier for express shipments by rail in the United States. Adams and Company provided shippers with a complete shipping solution, picking up goods at the shipper's location, carrying them to the railroad terminal, and then delivering them from the distant railroad terminal to the recipient's door.

== Biography ==
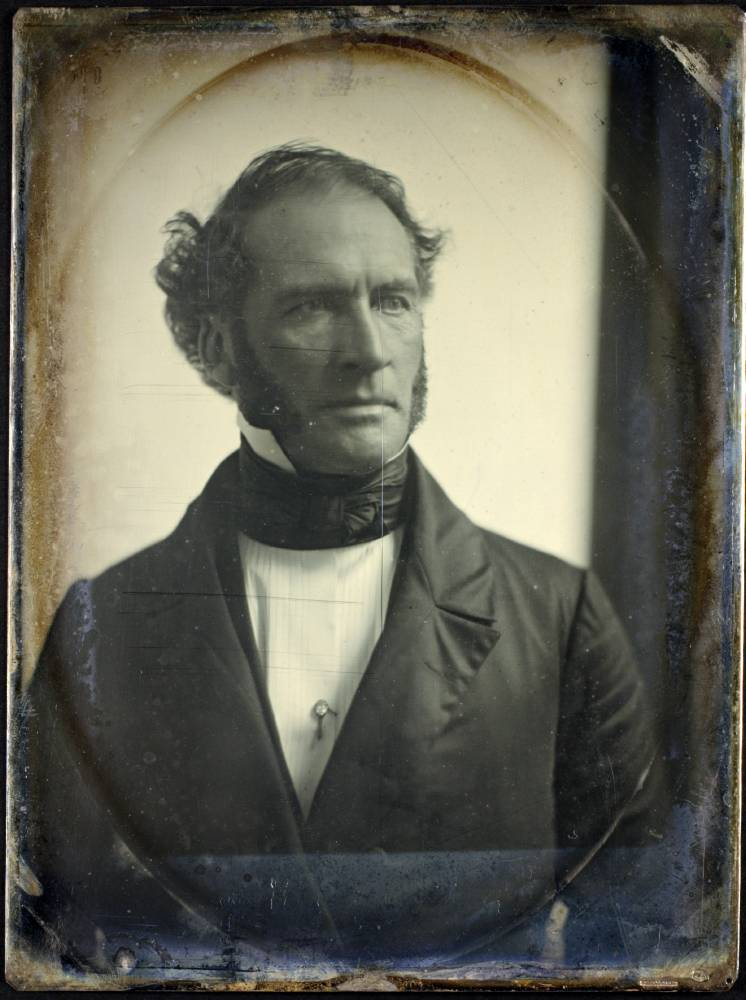
Alvin Adams circa 1850

Alvin Adams was born on June 16, 1804, in Andover, Vermont. to Jonas Adams (1758–1813) and Phoebe (Hoar) Adams (1765–1813). His father was descended from the same ancestor as President John Adams and Governor Samuel Adams, namely Henry Adams (ca. 1583 - 1646) who settled in Braintree, Massachusetts in 1632. Alvin was the ninth of eleven children. His parents died within a week of each other when he was eight years old. He came to Boston from Vermont a poor orphan boy to seek his fortune. He married Anne Rebecca Bridge (1809–1882) of Chelsea, Massachusetts on November 10, 1831. She was the daughter of cabinetmaker John Bridge (1783–1870) and Rebecca (Beal) Bridge (1787–1865). Alvin and Anne had nine children. A nephew of Alvin and Anne, John Bridge Pratt (1833–1870), later married the oldest of the famous Alcott sisters, Anna Alcott Pratt (1831–1893). A produce merchant ruined by the Panic of 1837, in 1839, Adams began carrying letters, small packages and valuables for patrons between Boston and Worcester, Massachusetts. On May 4, 1840, he established his first express freight route between Boston and New York under the name Adams and Company. The company established offices in Boston and New York, and soon added express routes to Baltimore, Maryland, Norwich, Connecticut, Worcester, Massachusetts, Washington, D.C., Pittsburgh, Pennsylvania, Cincinnati, Ohio, Louisville, Kentucky, and St. Louis, Missouri. Adams and Company started out by hauling mail for the nascent postal service, until that business was suspended by the US Government in 1845; in that year the transportation of mail was transferred to solely government-owned entities.

In 1854 Adams and Company merged with three other express agencies, Harnden and Company, Thompson and Company, and Kinsley and Company to form the Adams Express Company, with Adams as the president of the new company. The company was initially capitalized with $1,200,000. He was succeeded in 1855 by George Washington Cass.

Alvin Adams died September 1, 1877, in Watertown, Massachusetts. The company that he formed, the Adams Express Company, still exists and is one of the oldest companies listed on the New York Stock Exchange (NYSE: ADX), headquartered in Baltimore, Maryland.

== Notes ==
Business positions
Founder of company	President of Adams Express; 1854–1855	Succeeded by George Washington Cass
