= Eve LaPlante =

American writer

Eve LaPlante is an American writer of historical non-fiction.

LaPlante has published non-fiction books and many articles and essays, primarily about New England historical subjects, including some of her early American ancestors such as Anne Hutchinson in American Jezebel. Her nonfiction book Salem Witch Judge, won the 2008 Massachusetts Book Award for Nonfiction.

LaPlante's ancestor biographies have been “praised as reminiscent of a more celebratory Nathaniel Hawthorne", according to the Boston Book Festival. In the anthology Boston, which includes the preface to American Jezebel, Shaun O'Connell wrote: "Just as Nathaniel Hawthorne dug into the dark history of his ancestry, which reached back both to the original Boston settlement of the 1630s and the Salem Witch Trials of the 1690s, so too did LaPlante trace family members who were rooted in the same eras... Hawthorne took shame upon himself for the misdeeds of his Puritan ancestors, and LaPlante offers praise for her forebears who testified against Puritan repression. As her prefaces to these biographies, a kind of spiritual autobiography, show, Anne Hutchinson and Samuel Sewall were not the dark Puritans many imagined them to be. They remain living presences, even models of rectitude, into the twenty-first century."

LaPlante is a first cousin, four generations removed, of Louisa May Alcott through the only daughter (Charlotte May Wilkinson) of Louisa's uncle, the abolitionist and reformer, Samuel Joseph May and his wife Lucretia Flagge Coffin May.

She also collected and edited the private papers of her great great great great-aunt Abby May Alcott, the abolitionist and suffragist who was Louisa's mother and mentor. These writings were collected and published in 2012, under the title My Heart Is Boundless: Writings of Abigail May Alcott, Louisa's Mother (Free Press). LaPlante also authored a dual biography of Abba May Alcott and Louisa May Alcott entitled: Marmee & Louisa: The Untold Story of Louisa May Alcott and Her Mother (Free Press, 2012).

LaPlante graduated from Princeton University and received a Master's degree in education from Harvard University.

== Works ==
=== Nonfiction books ===
- Seized, 1993, 2000
- American Jezebel, 2004, 2005
- Salem Witch Judge: The Life and Repentance of Samuel Sewall, 2007, 2008
- My Heart is Boundless, 2012
- Marmee & Louisa: The Untold Story of Louisa May Alcott and Her Mother, 2012, 2013

=== Other works and articles ===
- "The Riddle of TLE." Atlantic Monthly, Nov. 1988 (medicine),
- "Out of Sight, Out of History." Jul. 2, 2004 (on Anne Hutchinson),
- "Born to Party." Boston Globe, Nov. 2, 2008 (Ideas cover story on biopolitics),
- "The Opposite of Thanksgiving." Boston Globe, Nov. 18, 2007 (Ideas cover story on Puritan thanksgivings),
- "A Heretic's Overdue Honor." Sep. 7, 2005 (op-ed on Anne Hutchinson),
- "First Steps at Speedskating." Boston Globe, Feb. 19, 2004
- "Visiting 'The Dead' in Dublin." Boston Globe, Jan. 20, 2002 (travel),
- "What's in a Name?" Jan. 18, 1994,
- "St. John: Almost Private Isle." Jan. 27, 1991 (travel),
- "Exile of a Polish Revolutionary." Apr. 7, 1984,
- "A Wealth of Knowledge." Oct. 12, 1986,
- "Dying Words: The Irish Language." Feb. 10, 1985 (cover story),
- "Rattle & Strum." Nov. 2000 (music),
- "Autumn Leavings: Sweet Pickings." Oct. 2000 (travel),
- "Pay Dirt." Sep. 2000 (profile of Maine potato farmer),
- "Edible Complex." Sep. 2000 (art),
- "Flour Power." Sep. 1999 (art),
- "The Secret Life of Language: High School Semiotics." Nov. 1983 (education),
- "Divorce: The Damage (Not) Done." Spring 2002 (essay/book review),
- "Mother's Day: Why we should be thanking Louisa May Alcott and Marmee." May 6, 2013,
- "Alyson's Orchard." Sep. 2002 (travel),
- "Hidden Cape Ann." Sep. 2000 (travel),
- "Seeking Charlotte and Wilbur." Sep. 1999 (travel),
- "Good Living: Dead Set in Dublin." Dec. 2002 (travel),
- "Still Life With Jelly." Jan. 2002 (art),
- "The University That Misogyny Built." Jan. 29, 2005 (op-ed on Anne Hutchinson),
- "Illinois Jacquet: A lot of Lovin' in Front." Sep./Oct. 1983 (music),
- "A Judge of Character: The Reformation of a Salem Witch Judge." Oct. 2011 (on Samuel Sewall),
- "Discovering Louisa May Alcott's Jewish History on Portuguese Tour." June 7, 2013 (travel),
- "The Baby-sitter." Mar. 1998,
- "Our Lady of the Hutch." Sep. 18, 2004 (op-ed on Anne Hutchinson),
- "Keeping the Landscape Hurdle-Free: Walking in Ireland." Jul. 8, 2001 (travel),
- "Bread, Tea, and Prayer." Apr. 7, 1996 (travel),
- "The Perfect Family Size." Jul. 1998,
- "Five Career Ruts You Can't Afford." Nov. 1987,
- "C.B. Fisk's Monumental Creations." Dec. 1985 (music)

== Book reviews ==
Eve LaPlante's books have received many awards () and widely praised. Her reviews include:

=== Marmee and Lousia ===
"Abigail May Alcott is at the center of Marmee & Louisa ... 'Marmee,' as her daughters called her, was a fine writer, an indefatigable reformer, a devoted teacher — and, above all, Louisa's literary lodestar ... [After] the wildly popular Little Women...Bronson was in clover. He was, he crowed, 'the Father of Miss Alcott.' At last, people came to hear him lecture. To his credit, though, and after his fashion, he mentioned in passing that Louisa's mother hadn't yet received 'her full share.' To her credit, LaPlante evens the score." - New York Times

=== My Heart is Boundless: Writings of Abigail May Alcott, Louisa's Mother ===
LaPlante certainly is justified in crowing about "My Heart Is Boundless," the vibrant companion volume that has been released synchronously with "Marmee & Louisa." For the first time, Abigail May Alcott's own writings — once thought to have been destroyed — have been compiled and published. LaPlante has edited and lightly annotated a rich selection of letters, journal entries, and sketches that demonstrate, in Abigail's own words, the spirited, complicated, visionary woman she was. - Seattle Times
