= Concord School of Philosophy =

1879–1888 lecture series in Massachusetts, US

Coordinates: 42°27′33.1″N 71°20′7.4″W

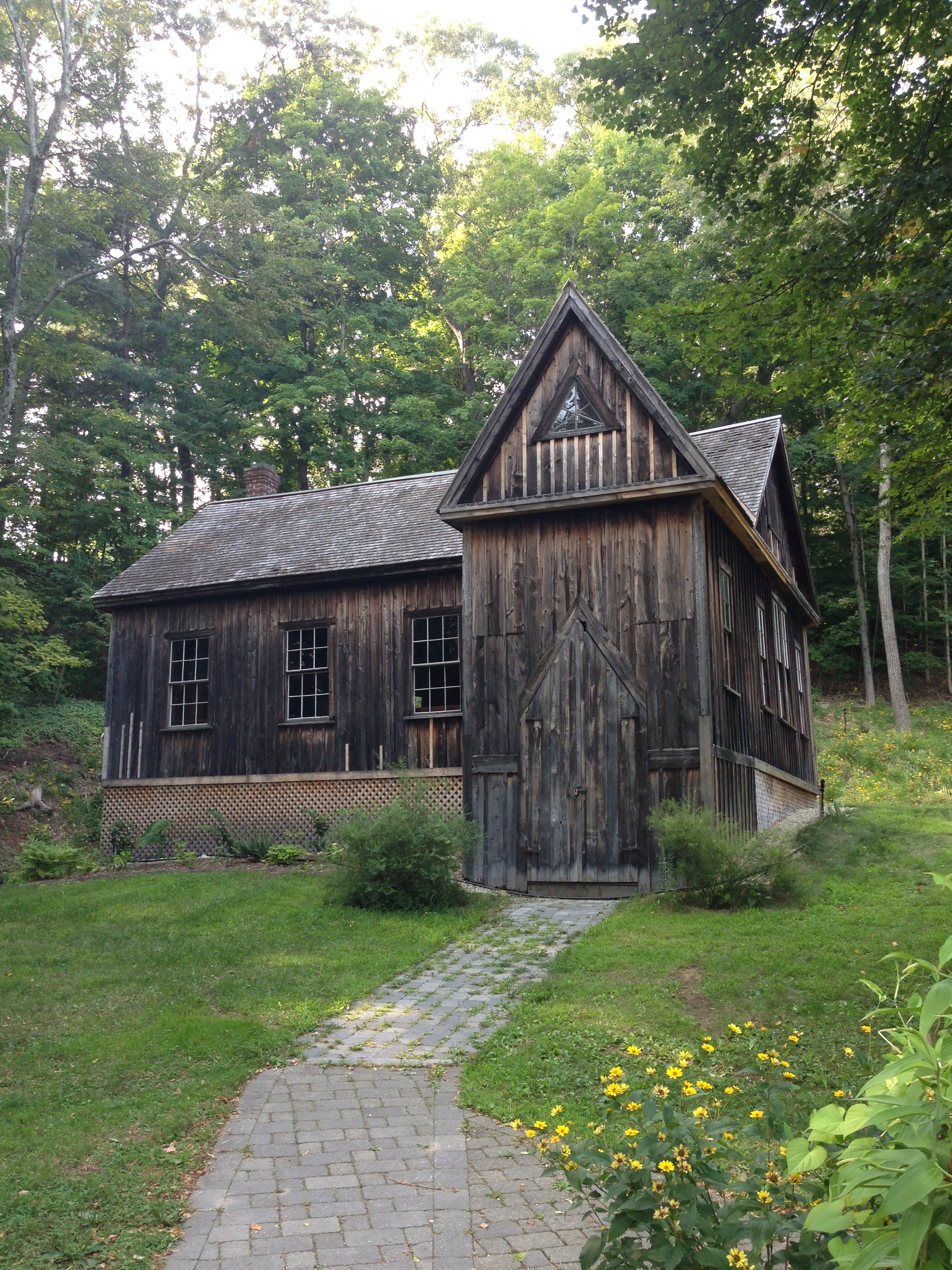
The Concord School of Philosophy convened in the Hillside Chapel on the property of Orchard House, the home of Amos Bronson Alcott and family

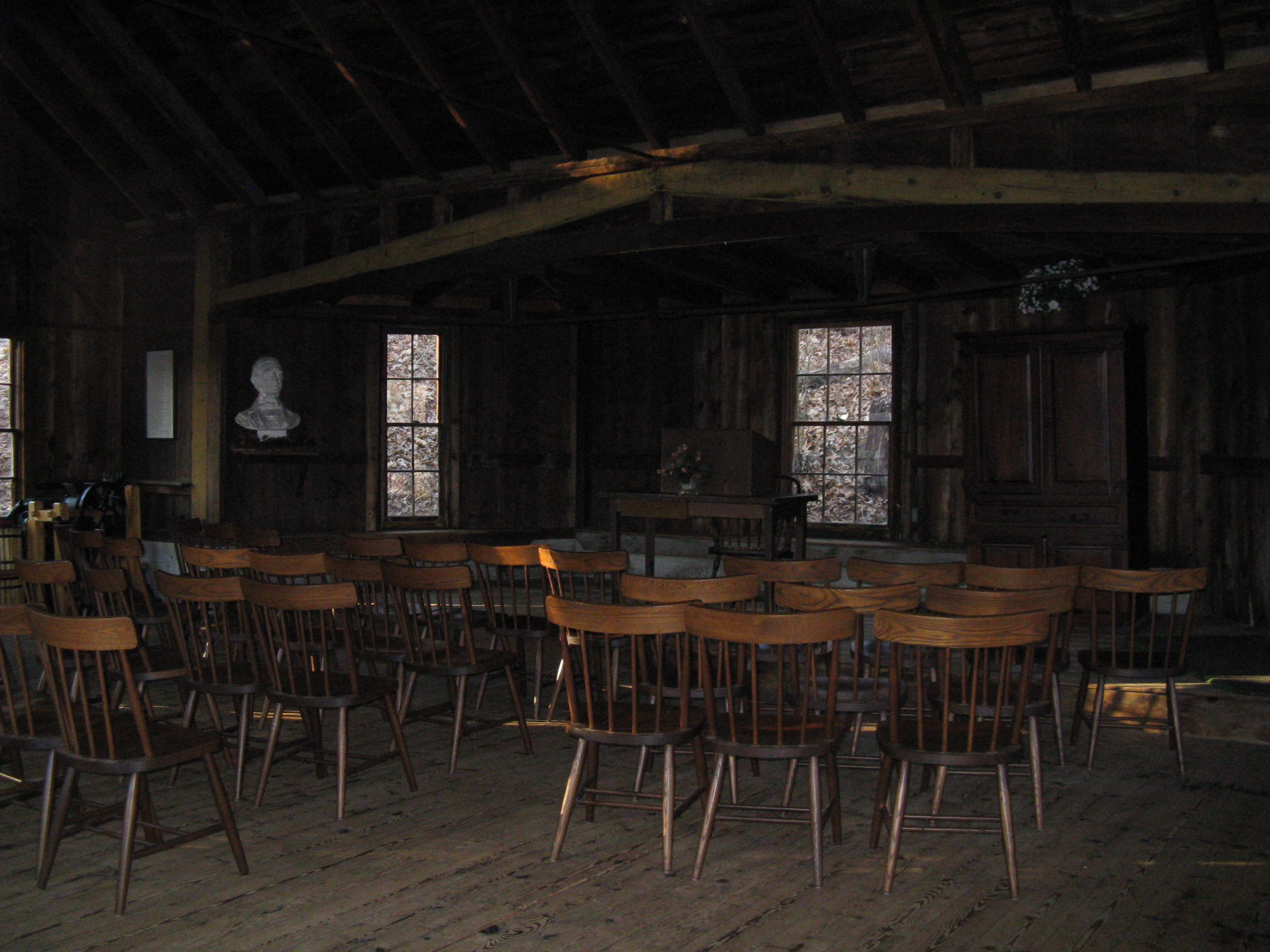
Inside the Concord School of Philosophy

The Concord School of Philosophy was a lyceum-like series of summer lectures and discussions of philosophy in Concord, Massachusetts, from 1879 to 1888.

== History ==
Starting the Concord School of Philosophy had long been a goal of founder Amos Bronson Alcott and others in the Transcendental movement. He and Franklin Benjamin Sanborn composed a prospectus for the school on January 19, 1879, which was sent to potentially interested people throughout the country.

The school opened in the summer of 1879; its first meeting was held in the study of the Alcott family home, Orchard House. A new home for the School was built for use the next summer with the financial support of William Torrey Harris and of his daughter Louisa May Alcott. Sanborn was the school's secretary.

The school was based partly on Plato's Academy. Many of the school's lectures and readings focused on reminiscences of the Transcendentalists: Ralph Waldo Emerson attended some of the school's meetings before his death, and was commemorated after; readings from Henry David Thoreau's then-unpublished journals were among the most popular events. In addition, there were many lectures on other philosophical topics — principally the neo-Platonism favored by Alcott and the Hegelianism favored by Harris, but series of lectures were also given on Kant and Fichte, among others. The final meeting commemorated Alcott, who had died in 1888.
