= John Bridge Pratt =

Inspiration for fictional character (1833–1870)

John Bridge Pratt (June 16, 1833 — November 27, 1870) was the husband of Anna Bronson Alcott Pratt, the elder sister of American novelist Louisa May Alcott. He inspired the fictional character John Brooke in his sister-in-law Louisa May Alcott's best known novels.

== Early life ==
John Bridge Pratt was born in Boston, United States, on June 16, 1833, the third child of Minot Pratt and his wife Maria Jones Bridge Pratt. The Pratt family lived at Brook Farm from 1841 to 1845, after which they moved to Concord, Massachusetts.

== Marriage and family ==
As a member of the Concord Dramatic Union, John Pratt fell in love with Louisa's elder sister Anna Alcott Pratt, reportedly during a production of "The Loan of a Lover". The two were married in the Alcott family home, Orchard House, on May 23, 1860. They had two sons, Frederick Alcott Pratt (1863–1925) and John Sewall Pratt (1865–1923), who were the models for Demi and Daisy Brooke in the Little Women trilogy.

== Death ==
After a brief illness, John Pratt died on November 27, 1870, in Maplewood (part of Malden, Massachusetts), where he and Anna were living.

== Connection to Alcott novels ==
John Bridge Pratt's life became the basis for the character of John Brooke in Alcott's Little Women and Little Men, with both his wedding and early death becoming important events in the story lines. In fact, Pratt's unexpected death in 1870 had prompted Louisa May Alcott, who was staying in Rome at the time, to write Little Men (published 1871) in order to provide financial security for the widowed Anna and her sons. His younger son, John Sewall Pratt, took Alcott as his surname when he was adopted by his Aunt Louisa near the end of her life. John and Anna's elder son, Frederick Alcott Pratt, married Jessica Cate, with whom he had five children before his death in 1910 in Chelsea, Massachusetts.
