= Thoreau–Alcott House =

Historic house in Massachusetts, United States

- U.S. National Register of Historic Places
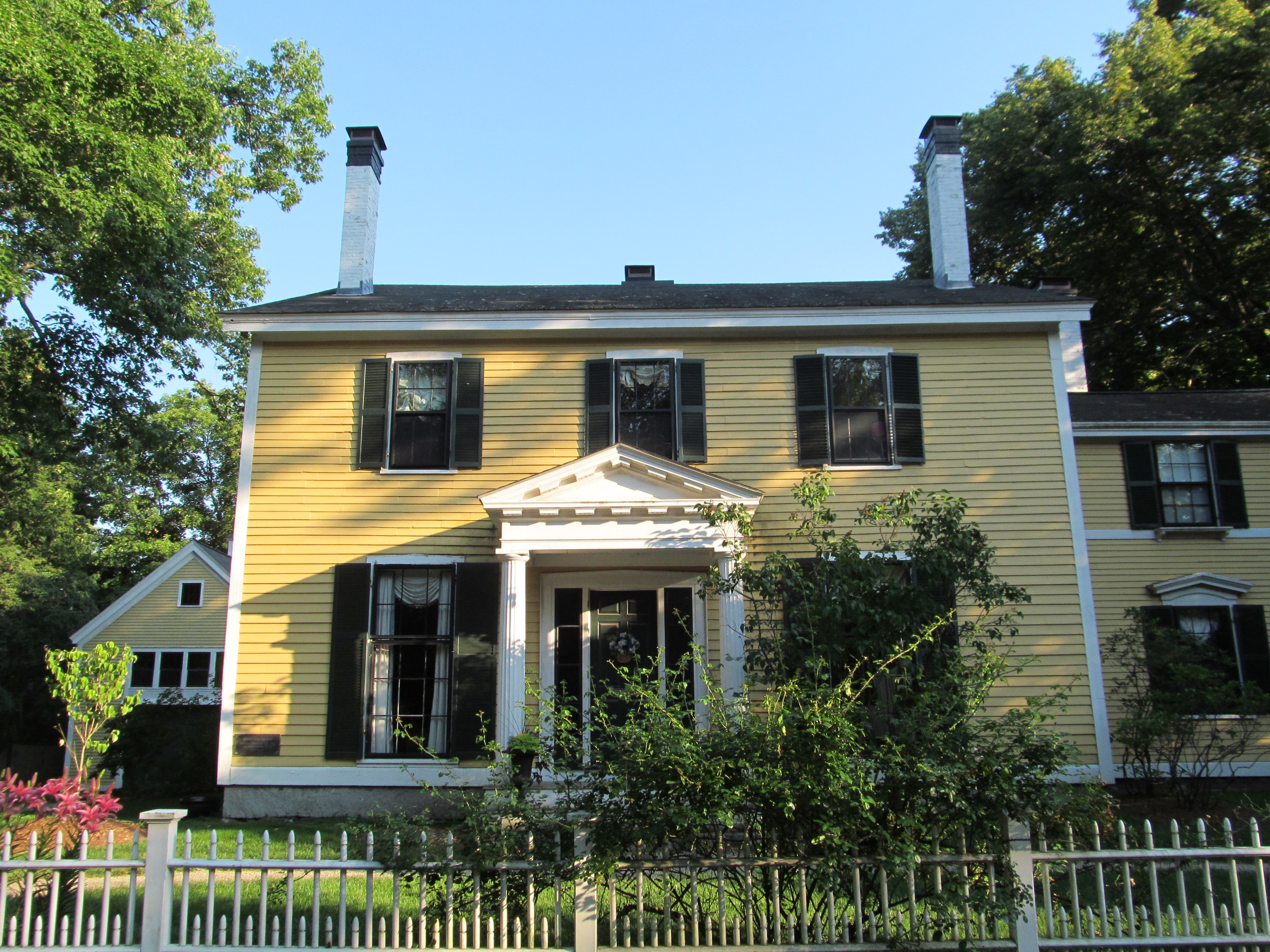

- Location within Massachusetts Location within the United States
- Location: 255 Main Street, Concord, Massachusetts
- Coordinates: 42°27′30″N 71°21′30″W
- Built: 1849
- Architect: Josiah Davis
- NRHP reference No.: 76000247
- Added to NRHP: July 12, 1976

The Thoreau–Alcott House is a historic house at 255 Main Street in Concord, Massachusetts, United States that was home to the writers Henry David Thoreau and Louisa May Alcott at different times.

== Description and history ==
The house was built in 1849 by Josiah Davis and was added to the National Register of Historic Places on July 12, 1976.

Henry David Thoreau moved to this home in 1850 with his family; he stayed until his death on May 6, 1862. After the death of her mother Abby May, Louisa May Alcott purchased the home for her recently widowed sister Anna Alcott Pratt. Louisa also moved to the house, along with her father Amos Bronson Alcott. It was in this home that Louisa wrote her novel Jo's Boys (1886), a sequel to Little Women (1868).

Today, the home remains privately owned.

== See also ==
- National Register of Historic Places listings in Concord, Massachusetts
- List of residences of American writers
