= Temple School (Massachusetts) =

Coordinates: 42°21′20.25″N 71°3′46.43″W

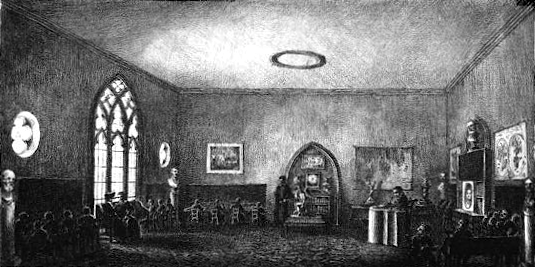
Bronson Alcott's Temple School, opened in 1834 in the former Masonic Temple, corner Tremont St. and Temple Place, Boston. Engraving by Pendleton's Lithography

The Temple School (1834 – c. 1841) in Boston, Massachusetts, USA, was established by Amos Bronson Alcott and Elizabeth Palmer Peabody in 1834, and featured a teaching style based on conversation. Teachers working at the school included Elizabeth Peabody and Margaret Fuller.

== History ==
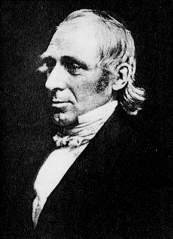
Undated portrait of Bronson Alcott

Alcott was fundamentally and philosophically opposed to corporal punishment as a means of disciplining his students; instead, he offered his own hand for an offending student to strike, saying that any failing was the teacher's responsibility. The shame and guilt this method induced, he believed, was far superior to the fear instilled by corporal punishment; when he used physical "correction" he required that the students be unanimously in support of its application, even including the student to be punished.

As assistants in the Temple School, Alcott had two young women who later numbered among nineteenth-century America's most talented writers: 30-year-old Elizabeth Palmer Peabody who, in 1835, published A Record of Mr. Alcott's School and 26-year-old Margaret Fuller, who was a teacher during 1836–1837. As students he had children of the Boston intellectual classes, including future writer Josiah Phillips Quincy, grandson of Harvard University president Josiah Quincy III. Alcott's methods were not well received; many readers found his conversations on the Gospels close to blasphemous, a few brief but frank discussions with the children regarding birth and circumcision were considered obscene, and a number of his ideas were denigrated as ridiculous. The influential conservative Unitarian Andrews Norton, a vocal opponent of Transcendentalism, derided the book as one-third blasphemy, one-third obscenity, and the rest nonsense. The school was widely denounced in the press, with only a few scattered supporters, and Alcott was rejected by most public opinion. The controversy caused many parents to remove their children.

== Image gallery ==
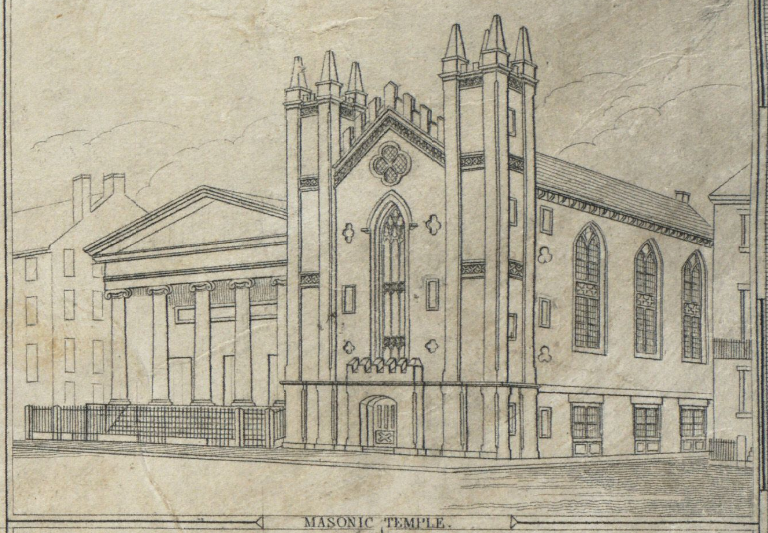
Masonic Temple, corner Temple Place and Tremont St., Boston, 1835

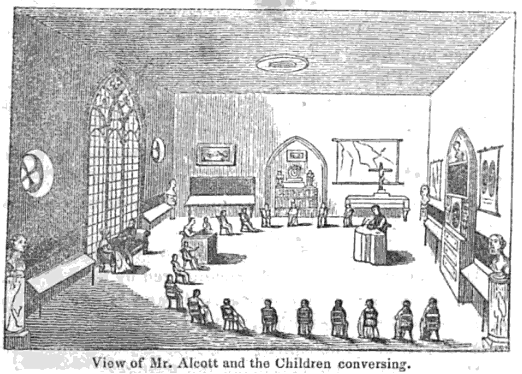
Class in session, 1837

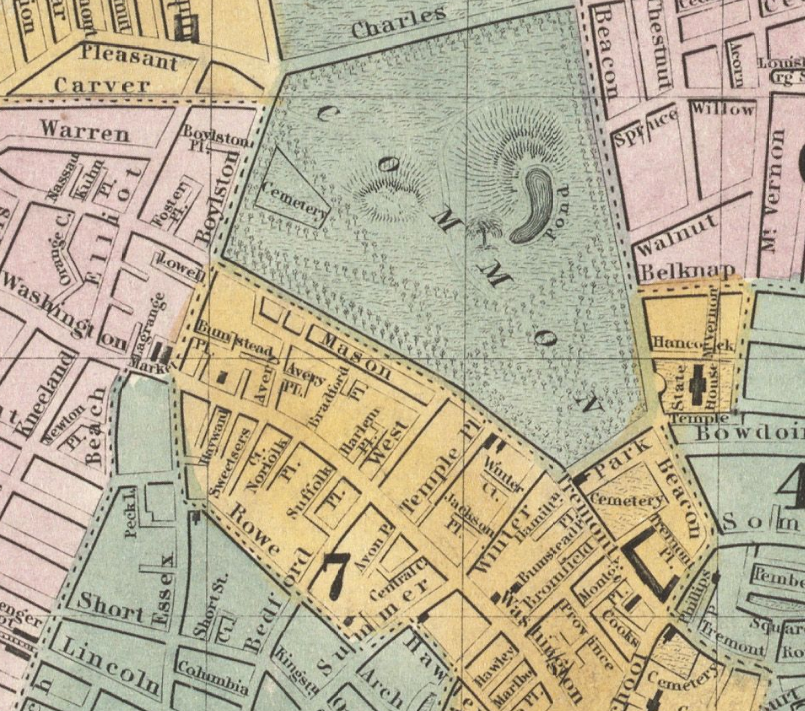
Detail of 1839 map of Boston, showing Temple Place
