= Elizabeth Sewall Alcott =

Sister of Louisa May Alcott (1835–1858)

Elizabeth Sewall Alcott (June 24, 1835 – March 14, 1858) was one of the two younger sisters of Louisa May Alcott. She was born in 1835 and died at the age of 22 from scarlet fever.

== Biography ==
She was originally named Elizabeth Peabody Alcott in honor of her father Bronson's teaching assistant at the Temple School and close friend of her mother, Abba. By age three, however, after a falling out between Bronson and Elizabeth Peabody, her name was changed to Elizabeth Sewall Alcott, after her mother's mother, Dorothy Sewall May.

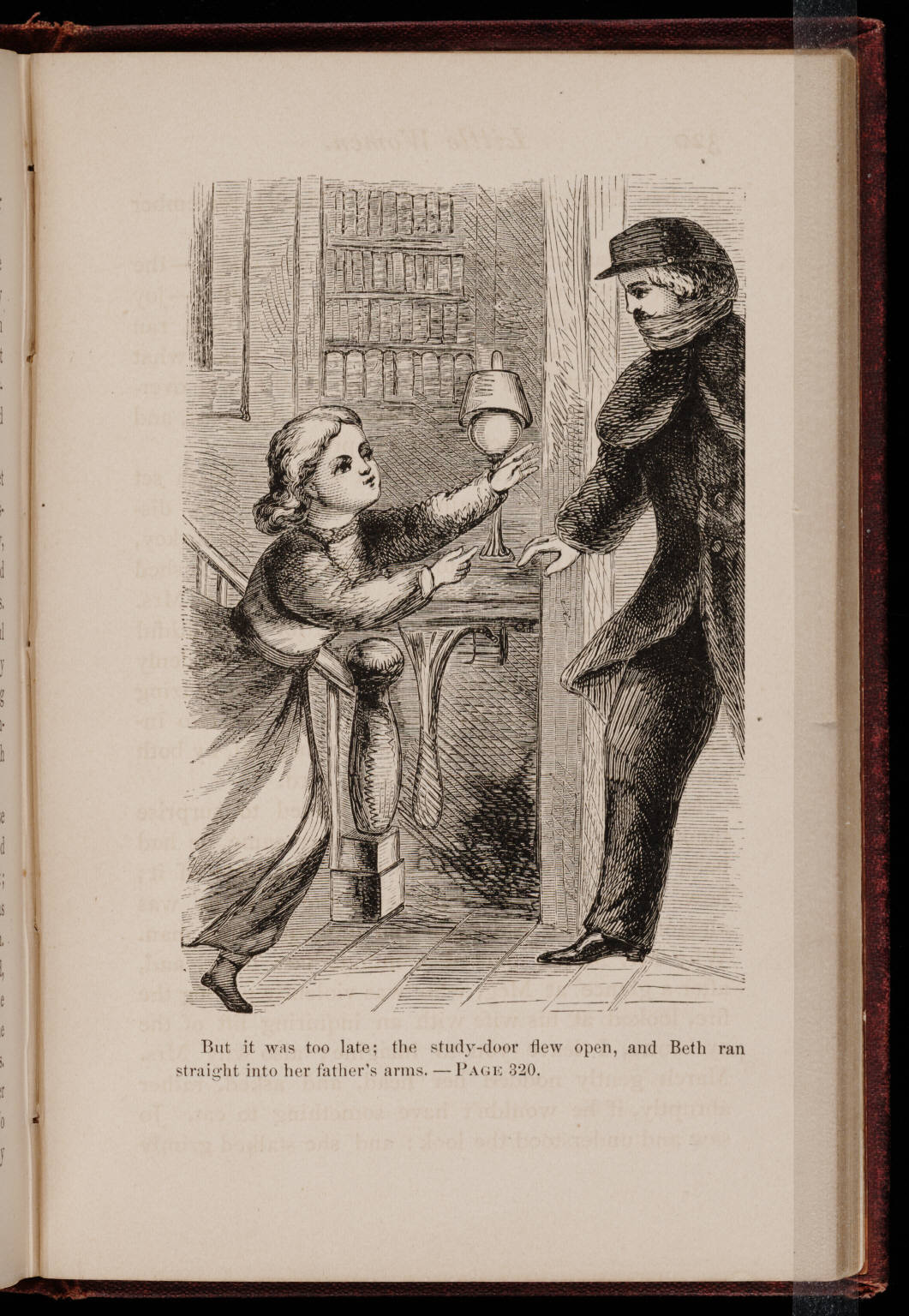
Elizabeth Alcott was fictionalized as Beth March in Little Women (1868).

In her semi-autobiographical novel, Little Women (1868), Louisa May Alcott represented her sister as Beth. She wrote:

Elizabeth — or Beth as everyone called her — was a rosy, smooth-haired, bright-eyed girl, with a shy manner, a timid voice, and a peaceful expression, which was seldom disturbed. Her father called her ‘Little Miss Tranquility’, and the name suited her excellently, for she seemed to live in a happy world of her own, only venturing out to meet the few whom she trusted and loved.

In 1856, Lizzie contracted scarlet fever while helping a poor German family. Although she recovered, she was permanently weakened. Her father Bronson was on a tour of the Western United States and had reached as far as Cincinnati when he heard that Lizzie, known to be ill, had taken a turn for the worse. By February 1858, she refused to take medicine and told her father, "I can best be spared of the four." As time went by, she grew weaker and thinner. On March 14, 1858, Lizzie Alcott died three hours after slipping into a coma. She was only 22 years old, about 3 months short of her 23rd birthday. On the same day, Louisa wrote in her journal:

My dear Beth died at three in the morning after two years of patient pain. Last week she put her work away, saying the needle was too heavy ... Saturday she slept, and at midnight became unconscious, quietly breathing her life away till three; then, with one last look of her beautiful eyes, she was gone.

— https://thespace.ink/general/journal-of-louisa-may-alcott/

At the moment of her death, Louisa, her mother, and the doctor saw a ghost-like mist rising from Lizzie's body. Her funeral was a small affair, with Ralph Waldo Emerson, Henry David Thoreau and Franklin Benjamin Sanborn serving as pallbearers. Lizzie was interred at Sleepy Hollow Cemetery.
