= Abigail May Alcott Nieriker =

American painter (1840–1879)

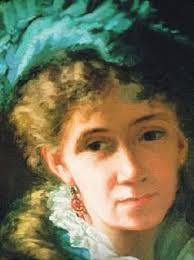
- Portrait of May Alcott Nieriker by Rose Peckman (detail)
- Born: Abigail May Alcott; July 26, 1840; Concord, Massachusetts, U.S.
- Died: December 29, 1879 (aged 39); Paris, France
- Resting place: Montrouge Cemetery, France
- Education: School of the Museum of Fine Arts in Boston, William Morris Hunt, William Rimmer, Krug, Vautier and Müller
- Known for: Painting
- Spouse: Ernest Nieriker (m. 1878)
- Children: Louisa May (Nieriker) Rasim (1879–1975)

Abigail May Alcott Nieriker (July 26, 1840 – December 29, 1879) was an American artist and the youngest sister of Louisa May Alcott. She was the basis for the character Amy (an anagram of May) in her sister's semi-autobiographical novel Little Women (1868). She was named after her mother, Abigail May, and first called Abba, then Abby, and finally May, which she asked to be called in November 1863 when in her twenties.

== Early life ==
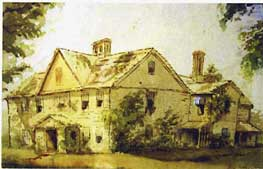
May Alcott Nieriker, Orchard House, watercolor of the Alcott family home, before 1879

Her temperament was elastic, susceptible. She had a lively fancy, a clear understanding... [I]ndependence was a marked trait.… She held her fortunes in her hands, and failure was a word unknown in her vocabulary of effort.

— Amos Bronson Alcott, her father

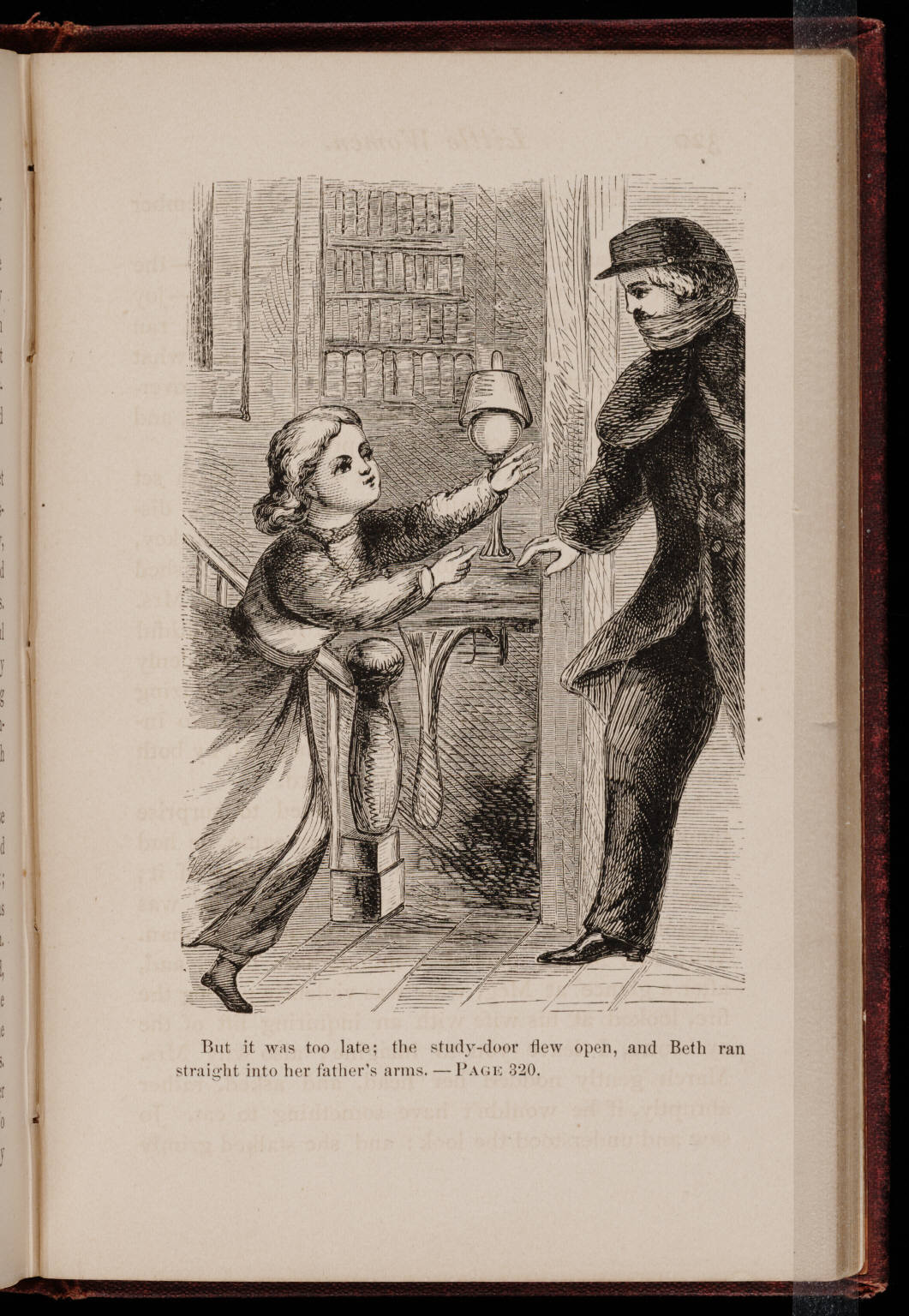
But it was too late; the study-door flew open, and Beth ran straight into her father's arms. Illustration from Little Women, published by Roberts Bros., 1868

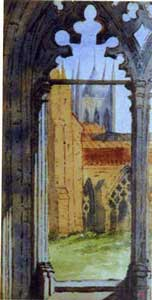
May Alcott Nieriker, Westminster Abbey, watercolor, by 1879

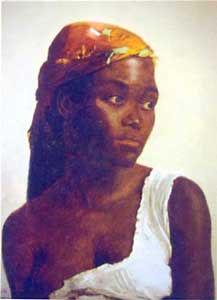
May Alcott Nieriker, La Négresse, 1879. Exhibited at the 1879 Paris Salon

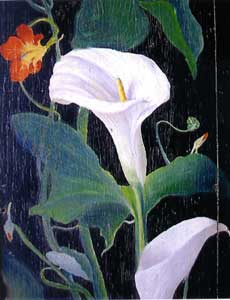
May Alcott Nieriker, Floral Panel, oil on panel in Louisa's room in Orchard House, made by 1879

Abigail May Alcott was born July 26, 1840, in Concord, Massachusetts, the youngest of the four daughters born to Amos Bronson Alcott and Abigail May Alcott.

Her sister was the novelist Louisa May Alcott, who supported her studies in Europe and with whom she had a fond relationship, although Louisa May was, at times, jealous of her family life and her ability to get what she wanted and needed.

Artistic from an early age, she inspired the character of Amy, one of the sisters in Louisa May Alcott's Little Women, whom Louisa described as follows: "She was never so happy as when copying flowers, designing fairies, or illustrating stories with queer specimens of art."

== Public education ==
She studied teaching at the Bowdoin School, a Boston public school beginning in January, 1853. Taking over for Louisa in 1861, May taught at the first Kindergarten founded by Elizabeth Palmer Peabody for a month before returning to her own work. Beginning in December 1860, May was in Syracuse, New York, where she taught an early form of art therapy at Dr. Wilbur's asylum (Syracuse State School). then returned home in August 1861 or 1862 to begin teaching art at the Concord school run by her father's friend Franklin Benjamin Sanborn.

== Art ==
=== 19th-century women artists ===
As educational opportunities expanded in the 19th century, women artists became part of professional enterprises, which included them founding their own art associations. Artwork created by women was considered to be inferior; women, in response to that stereotype, helped overcome it by becoming "increasingly vocal and confident" in promoting women's work, and thus became part of the emerging image of the educated, modern, and freer "New Woman". Artists, then, "played crucial roles in representing the New Woman, both by drawing images of the icon and exemplifying this emerging type through their own lives."

=== Education ===
Beginning in 1859, Alcott studied art at the School of the Museum of Fine Arts in Boston. May Alcott visited Paris, studied at the Académie Julian in 1870 and exhibited in both cities, as she also did later elsewhere in the US and in London. She painted flowers mainly, but also made excellent copies of works by J.M.W. Turner. She studied art anatomy with William Rimmer in Boston and also studied with William Morris Hunt, Krug, Vautier, and Müller among others. She even taught art to the young Daniel Chester French.

She studied in Paris, London, and Rome during three European trips in 1870, 1873 and 1877, which the 1868 publication of her sister Louisa's book Little Women made possible. She traveled on at least one of the trips with Alice Bartlett and her sister Louisa May, (Note: After the death of Anna Alcott's husband John Pratt in 1871, Louisa returned to Concord, while May stayed in Europe to begin serious study.) where she "came into her own as an artist." She studied sculpture, sketching and painting. In the meantime, she found that women had greater educational opportunities in Europe than in the United States, but the art academies did not allow women to paint live nude models. For that, she studied under Krug, who enabled both male and female students to paint live models.

Alcott had illustrated the first edition of Little Women, to a negative critical reception. The early illustrations were made before her trips to and studies in Europe.

=== Career ===
After studying in Paris, she divided her time between Boston, London and Paris. Her strength was as a copyist and as a painter of still life, either in oils or watercolors. Her success as a copyist of Turner was such as to command the praise of Mr. John Ruskin and secure the adoption of some of her work for the pupils to copy at the South Kensington schools in London.

She published Concord Sketches with a preface by her sister Louisa May (Boston, 1869). After having studied in Europe, she had become "an accomplished artist" by the 1870s, and her works during that time showed marked improvement compared to the earlier illustrations for Little Women and the "quirky" depiction of Walden Pond in Concord Sketches. Her works after her European studies and exposure to great works of art reflected "a surer hand, a clearer focus, and a broader vision as the world".

She created the plan and outfitted a studio in 1875 for a Concord art center to support and promote emerging artists.

In 1877, her still life was the only painting by an American woman to be exhibited in the Paris Salon, selected over the work of Mary Cassatt. She made portraits and paintings of exterior scenes, some with an oriental flair. John Ruskin praised her copies of J.M.W. Turner, having called her "the foremost copyist of Turner of her time." Her strength was as a copyist and as a painter of still life, in oils and watercolors, and she painted many panels featuring flowers on a black background. A panel of goldenrod given to neighbor and mentor Ralph Waldo Emerson still hangs in his study. Several can also be seen at the Orchard House in Concord.

She was living in London and studying landscape art when she met Ernest Nieriker. The couple married on March 22, 1878, in London. Authors Eiselein and Phillips claimed that the marriage occurred despite her family's reluctance. In contrast, Louisa Alcott called the day a "happy event" and described Ernest as a handsome, cultivated and successful "tender friend". Further, she declared that "May is old enough to choose for herself, and seems so happy in the new relation that we have nothing to say against it." May was 38 years old and Ernest Nieriker was a 22-year-old Swiss tobacco merchant and violinist. Ernest supported May's artistic career and had helped her through the death of her mother on November 25, 1877, becoming engaged in February 1878. The couple honeymooned in Le Havre and then lived in Meudon, a Parisian suburb, where she lived primarily after her marriage. (Note: Louisa May Alcott depicted the couple in the novel, Diana and Persis that she wrote about art in Boston's Bellevue Hotel. Persis was based upon May and August on Ernest. In it, "Alcott sets out to prove Avis in the wrong about a woman's ability to combine art, matrimony, and motherhood.")

The following year, she made the painting La Négresse, which was exhibited at the Paris Salon, "what might be judged her masterpiece" of her career. It is a realistic painting of a black woman that portrays her unique individuality without being romantic or erotic.

In her letters to family members, May expressed her happiness of married life as an artist in Paris.

In her book Studying Art Abroad, and How to do it Cheaply (Boston 1879) she advised:

"There is no art world like Paris, no painters like the French, and no incentive to good work equal to that found in a Paris atelier."

== Childbirth and death ==
On November 8, 1879, in Paris, May gave birth to a daughter, Louisa May "Lulu." Seven weeks later on December 29, 1879, May died, possibly of childbed fever. (Note: Her cause of death may have been unrelated to childbirth.) By her wish and because Ernest traveled often for work, May's sister Louisa May brought up Lulu (Note: Lulu crossed the Atlantic and was brought to Boston, Massachusetts, in the United States by her father's sister, Sophie Nieriker, and a nurse sent by Louisa May Alcott in September 1880.) until her death in 1888. Then Ernest Nieriker, May’s widower and Lulu’s father, raised Lulu in Zurich, Switzerland. (Note: Lulu's library represents the stories that her aunt Louisa wrote for her niece, and Louisa's last story, Lu Sing, was a parable written about Lulu, set in China. The story is included in a modern book The Uncollected Works of Louisa May Alcott which is illustrated by May's paintings and drawings. The proceeds of the book helped to fund the restoration of the Alcott family house, Orchard House. During her childhood, Lulu had an easy life in Concord, in the care of her aunt Louisa who considered her a "precious legacy" of her sister's life and warmly rose to the role of caretaker, comforter, storyteller, and supporter. Upon her aunt Louisa's death eight years later, she lived with her father, his sister Alice and niece Hanny in Zurich. She had difficulty adjusting to the German language and strict lifestyle of her father's family.)

Though Louisa placed a stone with her initials at the family plot at Sleepy Hollow Cemetery, May is buried in Paris at Montrouge.

In 2002, an exhibition of her work and life, "Lessons, sketching, and her dreams: May Alcott as Artist", was the first major show of her work.

== Gallery ==
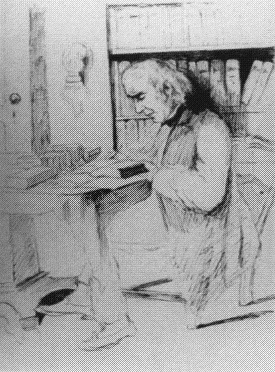
May Alcott Nieriker, Amos Bronson Alcott in his study, by 1879

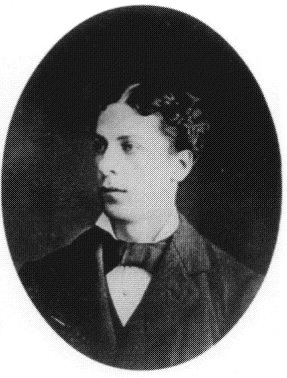
Ernest Nieriker, May Alcott's husband

== Publication ==
- Nieriker, May Alcott (1879). Studying Art Abroad: And How to Do It Cheaply. Boston: Roberts Brothers. OCLC 8699580. OL 6929381M.

Reprinted (2015) Fb &C Limited ISBN 978-1-330-70442-4
