= Adams Funds =

American investment company

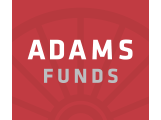
- Type: Public
- Traded as: NYSE: ADX
- Industry: Investment
- Founded: 1854; 172 years ago
- Founder: Alvin Adams
- Headquarters: Baltimore, Maryland, U. S.
- Key people: Mark E. Stoeckle (CEO); James P. Haynie (president)
- Website: www.adamsfunds.com

Adams Funds, formerly the Adams Express Company, is an investment company made up of Adams Diversified Equity Fund, Inc. (NYSE: ADX), a publicly traded diversified equity fund, and Adams Natural Resources Fund Inc. (NYSE: PEO), formerly Petroleum & Resources Corp., a publicly traded closed-end fund focused on energy and natural resources stocks.

Adams Funds traces its roots to the Adams Express Company, a 19th-century freight and cargo transport business that was part of the Pony Express system. It became an investment company in 1929, just prior to the October 1929 stock market crash. Adams survived the Great Depression and is now one of the oldest closed-end funds at 91 years old. The firm uses a disciplined investment process consisting of three core tenets: identifying high-quality companies through a proprietary research process; employing rigorous analysis to assess company fundamentals; and executing a portfolio management strategy focusing on generating long-term capital appreciation. Both funds make investment decisions with an eye toward protecting investors’ principal and generating dividends and capital gains that can be used as a source of income or reinvested to increase investors’ holdings. Both funds have consistently paid dividends for over 80 years and are committed to paying an annual distribution of at least 8% as of October 2026.

Adams Express was founded in 1854 and is one of the oldest companies listed on the New York Stock Exchange (NYSE: ADX). It is one of only five companies that has continued to operate as a closed-end fund since 1929. The company has paid dividends continuously since 1935. The Adams Express Building, the former New York headquarters for Adams Express, was constructed beginning in 1912. In 1976, Adams relocated its headquarters to Baltimore, where it is based today.

Adams Funds is located in Baltimore, Maryland, with an office in Boston, Massachusetts. Mark E. Stoeckle has been CEO and Senior Portfolio Manager of Adams Funds since joining the firm in 2013.

== History ==
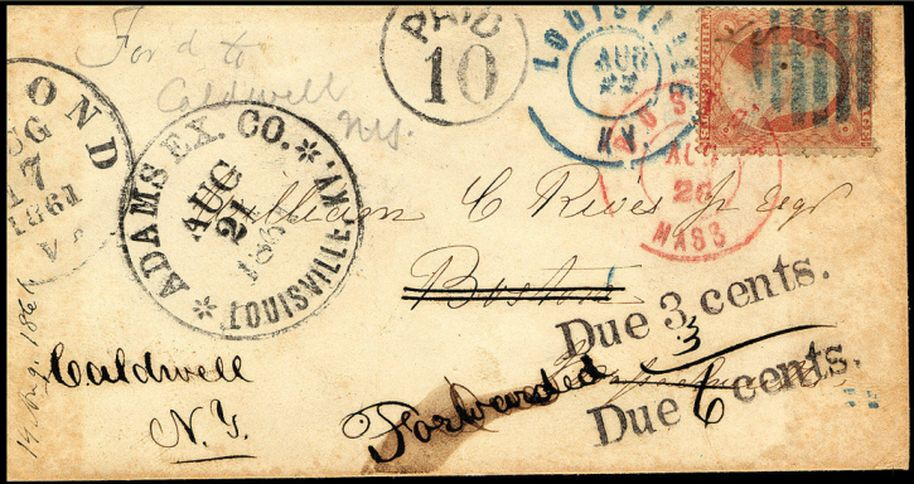
Civil War mail with Adams' postmark

In 1839, Alvin Adams, a produce merchant ruined by the Panic of 1837, began carrying letters, small packages and valuables for patrons between Boston and Worcester, Massachusetts. He had at first a partner named Burke, who soon withdrew, and as Adams & Company, Adams rapidly extended his territory to New York City, Philadelphia and other eastern cities. By 1847, he had penetrated deeply into the South, and by 1850 he was shipping by rail and stagecoach to St. Louis.

Adams Express was used by abolitionist groups in the 1840s to deliver anti-slavery newspapers from northern publishers to southern states; in 1849, a Richmond, Virginia slave named Henry "Box" Brown shipped himself north to Philadelphia and freedom via Adams Express. In 1855, the company was reorganized as the Adams Express Company.

A subsidiary, Adams & Company of California, had been organized in 1850 and offer express service throughout the Pacific Coast. The enterprise was led by Isaiah C. Woods. Not being under Adams' personal management, Woods badly handled it, and it failed on February 23, 1855.

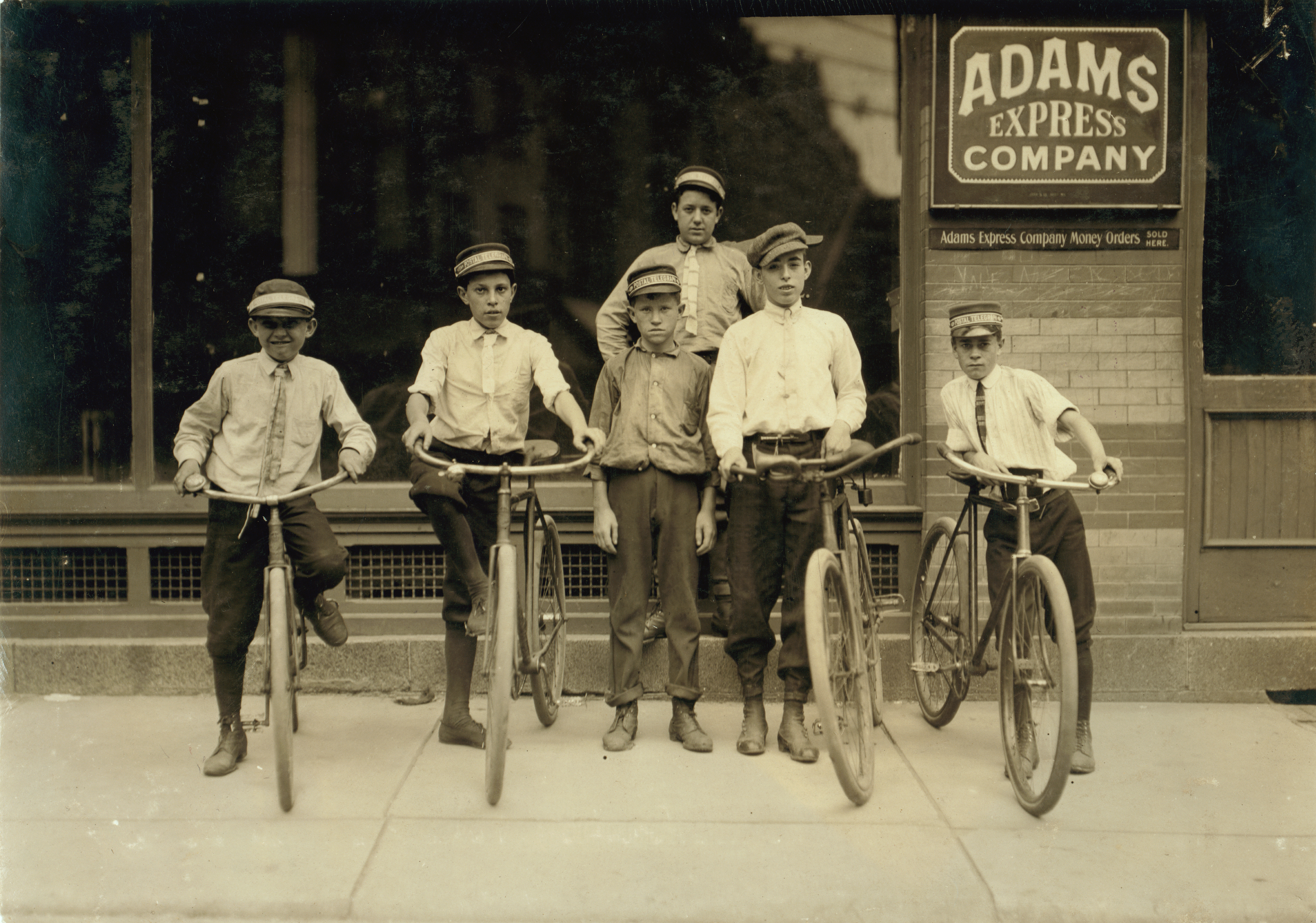
Child messengers, Norfolk, Virginia, 1911

By the time the Civil War started in 1861, Adams had operations throughout the American South, operating as Southern Express, led by Henry B. Plant. The company served as paymaster for both the Union and Confederate sides.

The parent company held a strong position from New England and the mid-Atlantic coast to the far Western plains. In 1910, it was the second largest stockholder in the Pennsylvania Railroad and the third largest in the New York, New Haven & Hartford Railroad, besides owning large blocks of American Express, Norfolk & Western Railroad and other shares.

The company's antebellum employment of Allan Pinkerton to solve its robbery problems was a large factor in building up the noted Pinkerton National Detective Agency. Along with the other express shipping companies, Adams' shipping interests were forcibly merged by President Woodrow Wilson into the American Railway Express Company, which later became the Railway Express Agency.

Since 1929, Adams Express has operated as a closed-end fund, (NYSE: ADX), located in Baltimore, Maryland. As of 2015, it had paid a dividend every year for 80 years (since 1935). Effective March 31, 2015, the company changed its name to Adams Diversified Equity Fund in recognition of the fact that its express activities had long ended; it continues to operate as a closed-end fund traded on the New York Stock Exchange under its previous symbol.

== Cultural references ==
Former slave Jordan Anderson mentions Adams Express as his preferred form of payment to compensate for his years of unpaid labor, in his Letter from a Freedman to His Old Master (1865).

Adams Express Company is referenced in the punchline to a Biblical joke found in The Big Fun Book:

Q: "Why was Eve made?"

A: "For Adams Express Company."

== See also ==
- Adams Express during the Civil War
- Petroleum & Resources Corporation
