= William Ware =

American writer and minister (1797–1852)

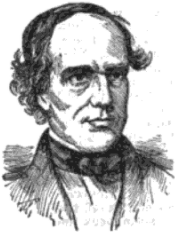
- Born: August 3, 1797; Hingham, Massachusetts
- Died: February 26, 1852 (aged 54); Cambridge, Massachusetts
- Education: Harvard University
- Occupations: Writer, clergyman

William Ware (August 3, 1797 – February 19, 1852) was an American writer and minister.

== Biography ==
Ware was born in Hingham, Massachusetts on August 3, 1797. He graduated from Harvard University in 1816, studied for the Unitarian ministry, and preached mainly in New York, and later in Massachusetts.

He achieved literary recognition chiefly from his authorship of two historical romances, Zenobia, or the Fall of Palmyra (first published as Letters from Palmyra, 1836 and 1837) and Aurelian (first published as Probus, 1838).

He contributed the "Life of Nathaniel Bacon" to Jared Sparks's The Library of American Biography. His Lectures on the works and genius of Washington Allston appeared in print in 1852. His Writings were published in 1904.

He died in Cambridge, Massachusetts on February 19, 1852.
