= Samuel Joseph May =

American reformer (1797–1871)

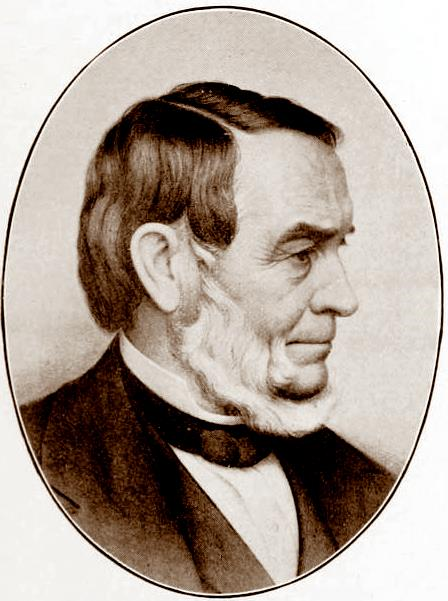
- Born: September 12, 1797
- Died: July 1, 1871 (aged 73)
- Spouse: Lucretia Flagge Coffin
- Parent(s): Colonel Joseph May and Dorothy Sewall

Samuel Joseph May (September 12, 1797 – July 1, 1871) was an American reformer during the nineteenth century who championed education, women's rights, and the abolition of slavery. May argued on behalf of all working people that the rights of humanity were more important than the rights of property, and advocated for minimum wages and legal limitations on the amassing of wealth.

He was born on September 12, 1797, in an upper-class Boston area. May was the son of Colonel Joseph May, a merchant, and Dorothy Sewell, who was descended from or connected to many of the leading families of colonial Massachusetts, including the Quincys and the Hancocks. His sister was Abby May Alcott, mother of novelist Louisa May Alcott. In 1825, he married Lucretia Flagge Coffin, with whom he had five children. Author Eve LaPlante, who wrote several books about his sister Abby May Alcott and a book about Sewall ancestor Judge Samuel Sewall, is one of his direct descendants.

== Education and early career ==
May was raised in Boston, Massachusetts, where he had been born in 1797 to Joseph May and Dorothy May (née Sewall). When he was four years old his six-year-old brother Edward died while they were at play in their barn. May claimed that the loss of his brother and the dreams he had following the fatal accident led him to devote his life to God and inspired his passion to "rectify the world's wrongs." He started attending Harvard in 1813 at the age of fifteen; during his junior year he chose to become a minister. In addition, while he was at Harvard and afterwards, he taught school in Concord, Massachusetts. During this time, he met many prominent Unitarians and activists, including Noah Worcester, who instilled in May the idea of peaceful opposition. He was in a party that was one of the first to travel on the Crawford Path, opened in 1819 by Abel and Ethan Crawford as a route to the summit of Mount Washington, New Hampshire, and today considered to be the oldest White Mountains trail in continuous use.

May graduated from Harvard Divinity School in 1820 and became a Unitarian minister. (See Harvard Divinity School and Unitarianism.) Following his graduation, he considered preaching in New York City and Richmond, Virginia, prior to accepting a position in Brooklyn, Connecticut, as the only Unitarian minister in that state. He came to the forefront of the Unitarian movement and became well known throughout New England as he attempted to make reforms and establish Unitarian churches.

In 1825, he married Lucretia Flagge Coffin, with whom he had five children: Joseph May, John Edward May, Charlotte Coffin (May) Wilkinson, Rev. Joseph May and George Emerson May. Their eldest son named Joseph died young. They also named a later son Joseph, in honor of him and May's father, Colonel Joseph May.

== Early reform ==
May began a biweekly publication, The Liberal Christian, in January 1823; its main goal was to explain the Unitarian theology. He helped in the formation of Windham County Peace Society in 1826; in 1827, May organized a statewide convention for school reform in Connecticut, and he started a series of lectures in 1828. Meanwhile, he also belonged to the American Colonization Society, whose purpose was to send free blacks to (not "back to") Africa. May's belief in perfectionism through imitation of the life of Jesus Christ strongly influenced his involvement in reform movements. A pacifist, he actively participated in establishing peace societies, speaking out against the death penalty, and advocating nonresistance. He practiced this last belief to the extent of rejecting self-defense. He became a leader in the temperance movement, believing it to be a form of abolitionism, since he saw men as "slaves" to drink. He was perhaps most renowned for his work in education reform, as he sought to improve facilities, teachers, and curriculum in public elementary schools. May believed schools should be racially integrated and coeducational, and he advocated the philosophy of Swiss theorist Johann Pestalozzi. He spent time tutoring his sister Abigail May in philosophy and the humanities and wrote in a letter to her, "What you say relative to the need for universal education is certainly true. Nothing is of unimportance in the formation of the mind."

== Involvement in abolitionism ==
In 1830, May happened to meet and create a strong friendship with Wm. Lloyd Garrison, which brought him into the abolitionist movement. Although his abolitionist views alienated his family, friends, and other clergymen, he remained true to his beliefs. He helped Garrison found the New England Anti-Slavery Society, the American Anti-Slavery Society, and the New England Non-Resistance Society, in addition to working for the Massachusetts Anti-Slavery Society. He served as one of the writers for the constitutions of some of these societies, and as a lecturer and general agent for the New England Anti-Slavery Society. Fighting for racial equality and better schools, May assisted Prudence Crandall in the 1830s when residents of Canterbury, Connecticut, through the state legislature, made it illegal for her to run her Canterbury Female Boarding School for "young Ladies and little Misses of color". This experience caused him to abandon his support for the colonization movement, since Andrew T. Judson, Connecticut's leading colonizationist, led the attack on Crandall's school. May was one of the delegates from the United States who attended the World Anti-Slavery Convention in London in 1840.

May became pastor of the Unitarian Church of the Messiah of Syracuse, New York, in 1845, serving until 1868. He fought the Fugitive Slave Law of 1850 by making announcements during his sermons of fugitive slaves in the area and taking collections on their behalf, as well as aiding escaped slaves along the Underground Railroad. As a prominent abolitionist in the city, May, with the help of many Liberty Party members, including Gerrit Smith and Samuel Ringgold Ward, planned and successfully executed the rescue of Jerry, a man arrested as a fugitive slave, from the police. In addition to fighting for the abolition of slavery, he fought for the equality of free Blacks in his congregations by allowing them to sit in the front as opposed to the segregated rear pews. This led to reproach from white congregation members and also to him quitting some of his parishes. These actions, particularly late in the 1850s and immediately after Lincoln was elected President in 1860, led abolitionism's opponents to violently attack May as well as burn him in effigy.

== Advocacy for the education of African Americans ==
Samuel J. May's pamphlet protesting Judson's unjust treatment of "Colored" families

May opposed efforts to block the establishment of schools for African Americans. He was a critic of Andrew T. Judson.

== Work for women's rights ==
In addition to speaking and writing pamphlets and articles concerning abolitionism, May was a leading advocate in women's rights and suffrage. Most notably, he wrote The Rights and Condition of Women in 1846 in favor of giving women the right to vote and allowing them equality in all aspects of life. May's work with the women's movement prompted him to move towards socialist economic views including redistribution of the nation's wealth, overhaul of the legal system, and a "soak-the-rich" income tax. He published a variety of other writings including "Education of the Faculties" (Boston, 1846); "Revival of Education" (Syracuse, New York, 1855): and "Recollections of the Anti-Slavery Conflict" (Boston, 1868).

== Final years and legacy ==
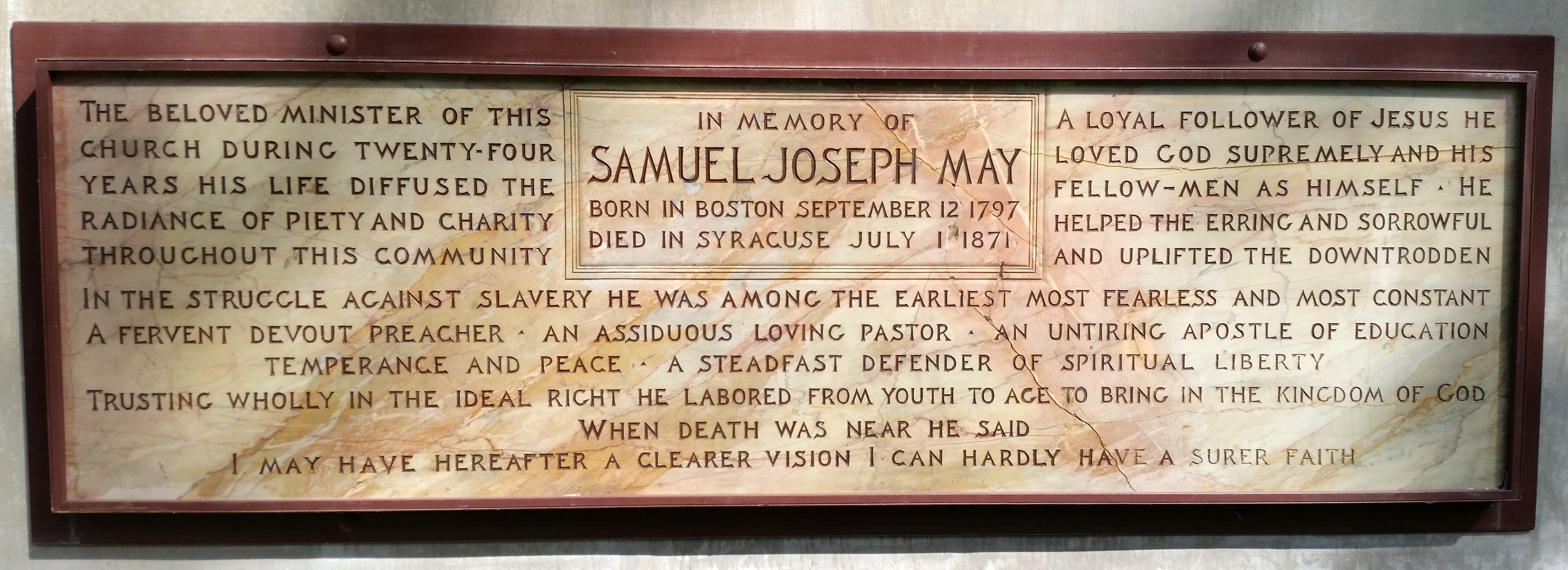
Stone plaque memorializing Rev. Samuel Joseph May, at the May Memorial Unitarian Universalist Society, Syracuse, NY

By the time of the American Civil War, May had long been torn between his commitment to pacifism and his growing belief that slavery could not be destroyed without violence. He felt that the use of force against the Southern rebellion was necessary. Following the war and success of emancipation, May continued his work for racial, sexual, economic, and educational equality until the end of his life, including service as president of the Syracuse public school district.

Samuel Joseph May died on July 1, 1871, in Syracuse, New York. He is buried at Oakwood Cemetery, Syracuse, New York.

=== The May pamphlet collection ===
May donated a collection of more than 10,000 works to the Cornell University Library in 1870. These included pamphlets, leaflets, and other local, regional, and national anti-slavery documents. Abolitionists William Lloyd Garrison, Wendell Phillips, and Gerrit Smith issued an appeal for additional contributions to the collection so that the literature of the anti-slavery movement would be "preserved and handed down, that the purposes and the spirit, the methods and the aims of the Abolitionists should be clearly known and understood by future generations."

In 1999, the Cornell University Library received a $331,000 grant "to catalog, conserve, and digitize the collection." This has been completed, and the collection is available online.

=== Legacy ===
In 1885, the Unitarian Church of the Messiah, in Syracuse, was renamed in May's honor to May Memorial Unitarian Church; it is now the May Memorial Unitarian Universalist Society (MMUUS).

In 2018, May was inducted into the National Abolition Hall of Fame in Peterboro, New York.

== See also ==
- Fugitive Slave Convention (Cazenovia, New York)
- Unitarian Meetinghouse
