= Abigail (Abba) May Alcott =

American activist (1800–1877)

Abigail May Alcott
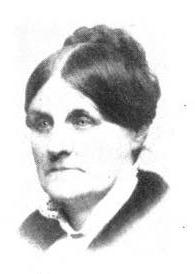
- Abigail May Alcott
- Born: October 8, 1800; Boston, Massachusetts, U.S.
- Died: November 25, 1877 (aged 77); Concord, Massachusetts, U.S.
- Occupation: Social worker
- Spouse: Amos Bronson Alcott (m. 1830)
- Children: Anna Alcott Pratt; Louisa May Alcott; Elizabeth Sewall Alcott; Abigail May Alcott Nieriker
- Parent(s): Colonel Joseph May and Dorothy Sewall
- Relatives: Samuel Joseph May (brother), Eve LaPlante (great-niece)

Abigail "Abba" Alcott (née May; October 8, 1800 – November 25, 1877) was an American activist for several causes and one of the first paid social workers in the state of Massachusetts. She was the wife of transcendentalist Amos Bronson Alcott and mother of four daughters, including Civil War novelist Louisa May Alcott.

== Early life ==
Abigail May came from a prominent New England family. On her mother's side, she was born into the families of Sewall and Quincy. Her mother, Dorothy Sewall, was great-granddaughter of Samuel Sewall, a presiding judge of Salem witch trials. Her father, Colonel Joseph May, was a lauded Unitarian layman. As a child she did not regularly attend a formal school.

Rather, she was educated in history, languages, and sciences by her tutor Abigail Allyn in Duxbury, Massachusetts. She was introduced to her future husband, Amos Bronson Alcott in Brooklyn, Connecticut. Abigail May later applied for an assistant position in Alcott's school in Boston. They married in 1830 and collaborated on projects such as the failed utopian community Fruitlands and the Temple School.

== Activism ==
A woman suffragist and an activist for the temperance movement, the poor, and the abolition of slavery, Abigail May Alcott imbued strong values in her four children. She and her husband served as stationmasters on the Underground Railroad.

According to her second daughter, author Louisa May Alcott, she "always did what came to her in the way of duty and charity, and let pride, taste, and comfort suffer for love's sake". Such humanitarian ideals extended beyond her household to the city of Boston, Massachusetts, where she accepted a full-time job as a social worker in 1848.

== Writings ==
Abigail May Alcott's personal writings were first collected and published in 2012, under the title My Heart Is Boundless: Writings of Abigail May Alcott, Louisa's Mother (Free Press). The collection was edited by her great-niece Eve LaPlante (descended from Abba's brother Samuel Joseph May), the author of the dual biography Marmee & Louisa: The Untold Story of Louisa May Alcott and Her Mother (Free Press, 2012).

She compiled a collection of vegetarian recipes (her husband was a vegetarian and cousin of William Alcott who was a student of the dietary reformer Sylvester Graham). The recipes were similar to the diet depicted in Transcendental Wild Oats (1873), Louisa May Alcott's fictionalized account of Fruitlands.

== Children ==
- Anna Bronson Alcott (March 16, 1831 – July 13, 1893)
- Louisa May Alcott (November 29, 1832 – March 6, 1888)
- Elizabeth Sewall Alcott (June 24, 1835 – March 14, 1858)
- Frederick Alcott (April 4, 1839 - April 6, 1839)
- Abigail May Alcott Nieriker (July 26, 1840 – December 29, 1879)

== Death ==
The death of Elizabeth "Lizzie" Sewall, the model for Beth in Little Women, on March 14, 1858, made Abba depressed and sad. Nineteen years after Lizzie's death, Abba herself died in November 1877. Louisa wrote in her journal: "I never wish her back, but a great warmth seems gone out of life... She was so loyal, tender, and true, life was hard for her and no one knew all she had to bear but her children." Abba is buried in the Sleepy Hollow Cemetery, Concord alongside her husband and three of her daughters.

== See also ==
- Amos Bronson Alcott
- Transcendental Club
- Utopias
- Women's Rights
