= Anna Alcott Pratt =

American teacher and writer (1831–1893)

Anna Bronson Alcott Pratt (March 16, 1831 – July 17, 1893) was the elder sister of American novelist Louisa May Alcott. She was the basis for the character Margaret "Meg" of Little Women (1868), her sister's classic, semi-autobiographical novel.

== Early life ==
Anna Bronson Alcott was born in the Germantown neighborhood of Philadelphia on March 16, 1831. She was the first of four daughters born to Amos Bronson Alcott and Abby May. She was named after both her paternal grandmother (Anna) and her father (Bronson). Amos Bronson Alcott was a schoolteacher and from the time Anna was born, he took detailed notes on his daughter's development.

Anna was primarily educated at home although she attended her father's Temple School in the late 1830s.

From an early age, Anna was "stage-struck" and secretly longed "to shine before the world as a great actress or prima donna." In her youth, she and her sister Louisa created romantic melodramas which they performed for friends. While Louisa was known among friends for her comedic acting, Anna "could cause handkerchiefs to come out and much swallowing of lumps in the throat."

Between 1847 and 1849, Anna and Louisa coauthored a tragedy entitled Norna; or, The Witch's Curse. It was published after Louisa's death in Comic Tragedies (1893) which featured an introduction by Anna titled "A forward from Meg."

== Career ==
In 1850, Anna opened a small school in Boston with approximately 20 pupils. In 1853, she accepted a teaching position in Syracuse, New York.

== Marriage and children ==
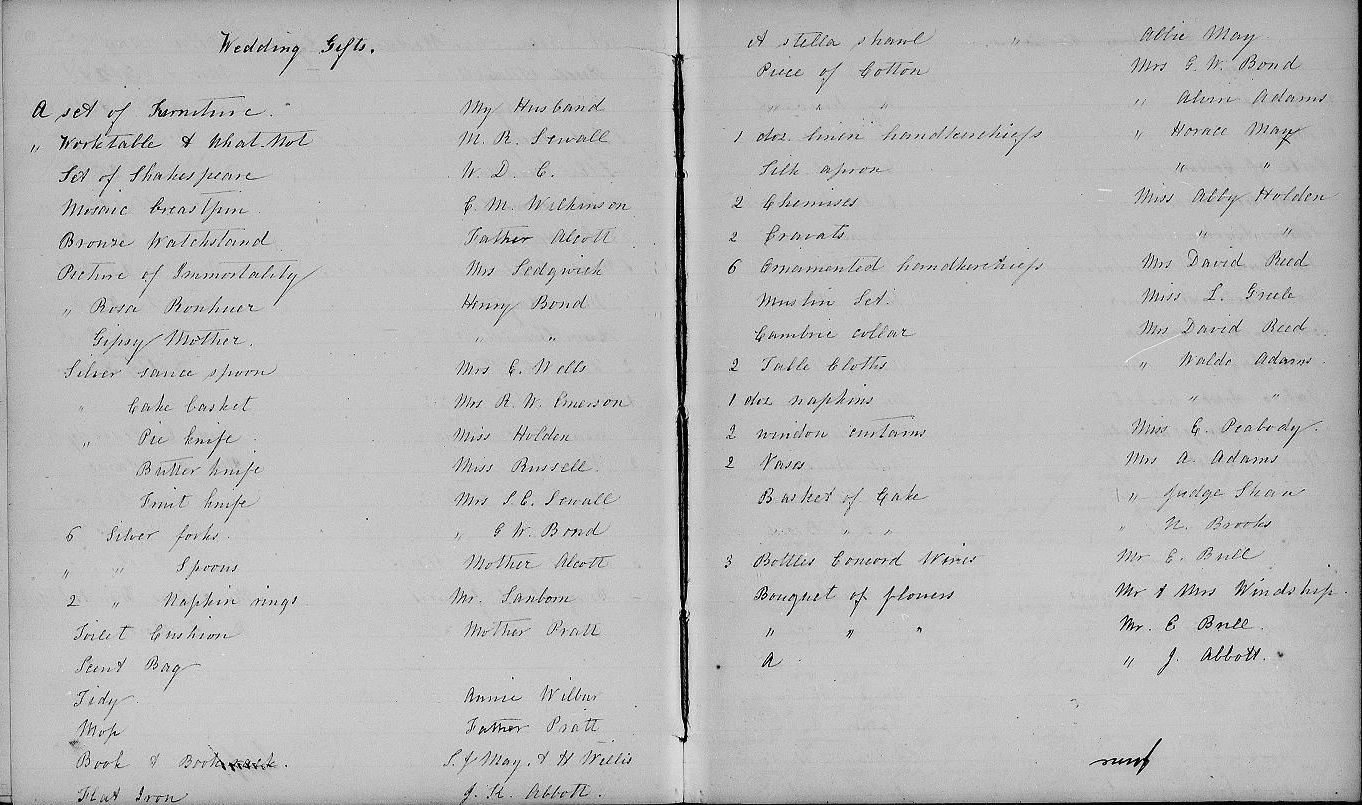
List of wedding gifts given to Anna Alcott and John Bridge Pratt

In 1858, the year they moved to Orchard House in Concord, Louisa and Anna helped form the Concord Dramatic Union. Another member of the group was John Bridge Pratt. He and Anna fell in love while playing opposite each other in a play called "The Loan of a Lover."

The couple announced their engagement in spring 1858 and married at Orchard House in May 1860. Their wedding provided the basis for the fictional marriage of Meg and John in Little Women. Anna wore a grey silk dress to the wedding. Guests included Henry David Thoreau, Ralph Waldo Emerson, Lidian Jackson Emerson and Franklin Benjamin Sanborn. The early years of the marriage are portrayed in Anna's diary (1859–1862).

Anna and John had two sons: Frederick Alcott Pratt (1863–1910) and John Sewall Pratt (1865–1923). John Sewall Pratt later changed his name to John Alcott "in deference to Louisa [May] Alcott's will." Both worked in book publishing.

== Later life and death ==
John Bridge Pratt died unexpectedly in late 1870.

After her husband's death Anna purchased the Thoreau-Alcott House on Main Street in Concord in 1877 with help from her sister Louisa. Anna had $2,500 in savings and the asking price for the house was $5,000. Louisa offered $4,500 which was accepted.

Anna's last years were spent caring for those she loved, including her own sons, her sister Louisa, and "Lulu", the daughter of her late sister May Alcott Nieriker.

Anna died in Concord, Massachusetts on July 17, 1893, and she was buried in the family lot on Author's Ridge in Sleepy Hollow Cemetery, Concord.
