= Jack and Jill: A Village Story =

1880 children's novel by Louisa May Alcott

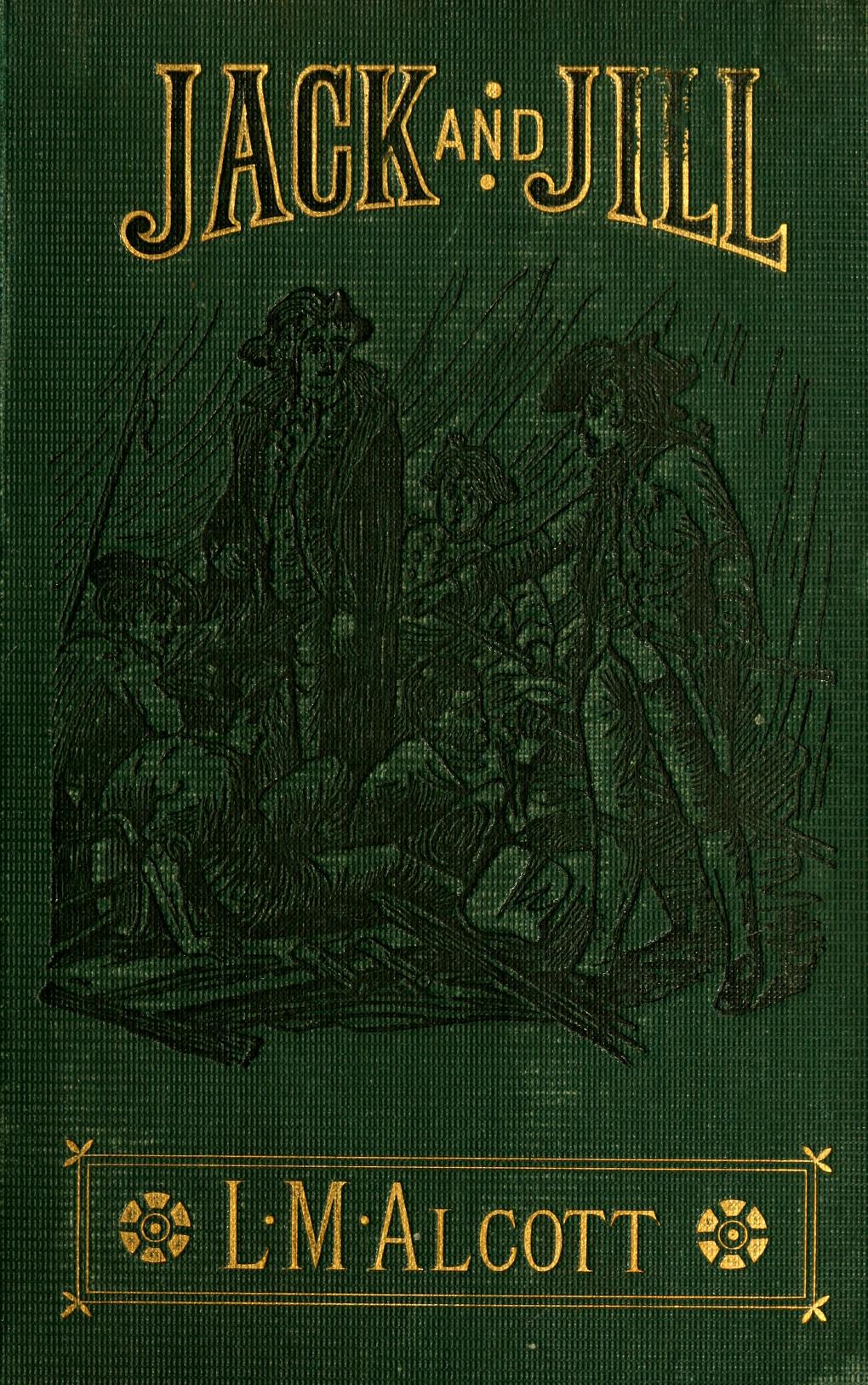
- First edition cover
- Author: Louisa May Alcott
- Language: English
- Genre: Children's
- Publisher: Roberts Brothers
- Publication date: 1880
- Publication place: United States
- Pages: 325

Jack and Jill: A Village Story by Louisa May Alcott is a children's book originally serialized in St. Nicholas magazine December 1879–October 1880 and belongs to the Little Women Series. Parts of it were written during the death of May Nieriker. The novel takes place in the fictionalized New England town of Harmony Village. Jack and Jill is the story of two friends named Jack and Janey and tells of the aftermath of a serious sledding accident. After publication, the novel received reviews comparing it to Little Women and praising its portrayal of reality, while other reviews criticized its romance. Later, parts of the book were adapted into a Christmas play. Authors and professors analyzing Jack and Jill emphasize Alcott's portrayals of gender, disability, and education.

== Background and publication history ==
=== Composition ===
Alcott sent sample chapters of Jack and Jill to her editor, Mary Mapes Dodge. When Dodge expressed satisfaction after reading them, an encouraged Alcott wrote four more chapters. Writing one chapter of the book every day, Alcott wrote in her journal that she “peg[ged] away very slowly”. In writing, Alcott drew upon the lives of local Concord children, explaining that “Jack and Jill are right out of our own little circle”. Several children wanted to be included in the story.

At the end of 1879, when Alcott began work on the novel, her sister May Nieriker was due to deliver her child. Alcott wanted to see May in Paris in time for the delivery, but reluctantly decided against it because she knew she would be seasick and did not want to be a burden. She wrote, “I know I shall wish I had gone; it is my luck.” Instead, she stayed at the Bellevue Hotel to finish writing Jack and Jill. May died from complications developed after childbirth and left her newborn, Lulu, to Alcott’s care. After May’s death, Alcott resided for a time at Willow Cottage, Magnolia, which makes an appearance in Jack and Jill. On January 1, 1880, she wrote in her journal, “Tried to write on ‘J. and J.’ to distract my mind; but the wave of sorrow kept rolling over me”. In January she finished the book and expressed the hope that her mourning did not affect what she intended to be a cheerful story.

=== Editions ===
Jack and Jill was serialized in St. Nicholas from December 1879 to October 1880. The book was first published in novel format by the Roberts Brothers in 1880 with four illustrations that were included in the serialized edition, one of which is attributed to Frederick Dielman. It was again published by Roberts Brothers in 1893 and included two more illustrations as well as images of Alcott’s original manuscript. Little, Brown and Company published the book in 1905 with eight illustrations by Harriet Roosevelt Richards and again in 1907 with illustrations by Frederick Dielman and an anonymous artist. Little, Brown and Company also published a 1928 edition with color illustrations, including some by Bertha Miller. In 1948 Jack and Jill was published as a Rainbow Classic with four illustrations by Nettie Weber.

== Plot ==
Jack Minot and Janey Pecq are best friends who are neighbors. Because of their friendship, Janey gets the nickname of Jill, to mimic the nursery rhyme. Jill and her mother are poor, whilst Jack's family are better off. One afternoon in winter, when Jack and Jill sled with their friends, Jill decides to sled down a dangerous hill. Jack suggests they sled across the pond instead, but Jill insists she will go down the hill. She goes down the hill and crashes but is not hurt. Jack decides to take Jill down the hill himself. After a couple runs, they crash, and Jack breaks his leg while Jill hurts her back. Mrs. Pecq fears Jill may be crippled for life but does not tell her. To help Jill cheer up, Mrs. Pecq suggests that Jill and her friends, Molly and Merry, begin improving their homes; they call this project their "missions".

As Christmas approaches, Mrs. Minot tasks Jack and Jill with making decorations for the tree. Jill and Mrs. Pecq join the Minots on Christmas, and Jill is presented with the Bird Room, decorated with paper birds, where she and Jack can spend time together. Mrs. Minot and Mrs. Pecq reveal that the two families will live together in the Minots' house until the children recover. Jack and Jill decide to keep up with their lessons at home so they do not fall behind in school. One day Jill decides to read a letter lying near the writing table; the letter says she will likely never recover. Mrs. Minot finds out that Jill read the letter but lets her choose whether or not to confess. That afternoon, Merry asks her parents for permission to decorate her room and promises to do her chores in return; the decorations are ruined when her room accidentally catches on fire. Meanwhile, Molly decides that she will tidy her house and keep her little brother clean and well-dressed, which turns out to be difficult. Molly's widowed father and the housekeeper do little to take care of the children.

In February Jack is well enough to attend school. Jill amuses herself by helping her drama club prepare for a performance with the village boys. Jill is chosen to play the part of Sleeping Beauty. When the performance comes, the boys act out tableaus from George Washington's life and the girls perform Sleeping Beauty as well as Mother Goose rhymes. Later, Jack's older brother Frank and a friend visit the trainyard and drive an unsupervised steam engine, nearly crashing into another train before reversing the engine in time. They are banned from the trainyard.

The Temperance Lodge, which is a boys' club that Frank and Jack attend, decides to befriend a troublemaker named Bob in hopes of having a good influence on him. Later, Jack wants to earn some money but refuses to tell anyone why. At Jill's suggestion, he sells cards. The teacher, Mr. Acton, punishes Jack because he was seen in the back room of a sweet shop; the back room has alcohol and a billiard table. At home, Mrs. Minot unsuccessfully tries to find out why Jack was there. Jill writes a letter to Bob and finds out that he owed someone money, which Jack paid for him in the shop's back room. Told what happened, Mr. Acton publicly excuses Jack from blame.

Almost four months after the sledding accident, Mrs. Minot tells Jack, Frank, and Jill that Jill and Mrs. Pecq are to live with them permanently. Jill is also given a back brace, which allows her to sit up and walk a little. Meanwhile, Merry' and Molly's housekeeping improves and Jack's friend Ed Devlin becomes sick and dies. Jill and the Minots spend the summer at Pebbly Beach, where they make many friends and Jill's health improves. Later Molly and her brother visit and join in a celebration at Pebbly Beach. When the families come back, Mrs. Minot decides that the children should take a couple years' break from school and tells Frank to delay college for a year. Mrs. Minot teaches Jill, Molly, and Merry at home. Mrs. Hammond, a physician, teaches the girls about physiology. It is revealed that when the children are older, Merry marries a budding artist named Ralph and Jill marries Jack, with Molly remaining unmarried.

== Reception ==
The Hartford Daily Courant praised Jack and Jill as "the best [Alcott] has written for years" and said that some readers thought it as good as or better than Little Women and Little Men. Jack and Jill, The Springfield Daily Union opined, "is the best story [Alcott] has written". The Boston Courier called it "one of the brightest" of her "recent efforts", including "much vivacity and strength". The Springfield Daily Republican praised Alcott for creating realistic stories, while The Saturday Review of Politics, Literature, Science, and Art noted that the days in the book were long and the "mothers at least twenty times as long-suffering" as what the editors were familiar with. The Independent described it as "a fairly good book for juvenile readers" but not as good as Little Women or An Old-Fashioned Girl. Horace Scudder of The Atlantic Monthly criticized Alcott's inclusion of romance, noting that Alcott saw it as "drawing the picture of a natural society of boys and girls who are soon to be young men and young women." In reference to the focus on injured children, Scribner's Monthly wrote that Alcott was approaching "false sentimentality."

== Analysis ==
=== Gender ===
Author and Louisa May Alcott scholar Gregory Eiselein argues that Jack and Jill demonstrates “conformity and submission” rather than feminist ideals. Maude Hines, a professor of English at Portland State University, noticed the use of a Victorian theme in which tomboys develop into socially acceptable women of the time. She and author Ruth K. MacDonald view Jill’s injury as a punishment for seeking equality with the village boys, as Jack and his male friends have successfully gone down the hill in the past without injury. Jill’s eventual taming, which is a result of being injured, does not transform her into a Victorian feminist, but instead prepares her for the socially accepted role of females. Both Mrs. Pecq and Mrs. Minot desire this for her. Jack’s injury is feminizing, claims Hines, because he cannot participate in his athletics and decides to imitate his mother’s patience. Jack attempts to preserve his masculinity with the village boys by pretending he is not interested in a kitten, which Alcott described as “girlish”. Another boy teases him for writing a tender letter to Jill. Mrs. Minot teaches Jack about his and Jill’s socially accepted gender roles, explaining that Jack should submit less to Jill and she more to him. Alcott challenges these roles with Jack’s gentleness and Jill’s strong will.

During Jack’s and Jill’s recoveries, the village children shift from having largely homosocial friendships to experiencing heterosexual attraction. Likewise, the accident “resets” Jack and Jill’s friendship, making it heterosexual when it was initially heterosocial and platonic in most of the story. Hines sees an inequality between the children because Jack is wealthy, male, and characterized as having more morality than Jill. Alcott describes Jill as a "gypsy" because of her dark hair and rosy cheeks. Though Jill is the same race as the other characters in the novel, Hines says, she is racially set apart through this description. Jack, who is blonde, is representative of the Victorian ideal of a fair complexion. In the months after the accident, Jill’s face alternates between rosiness and paleness; Hines points out that Jill is typically ruddy when she exhibits masculine traits. Jill’s increased paleness is demonstrative of her transformation from masculinity to femininity.

=== Disability ===
According to children's literature professor and author Kristina West, “[d]isability figures as education” for the novel’s characters. Jill’s injury gives her the opportunity to develop into a more tame, patient, and obedient girl. Jill does not personally know any disabled adults to guide her as she deals with her injury. Mrs. Minot tells Jill about an invalid, Lucinda Snow, to give her an example of how she should approach her injury. Mrs. Pecq’s suggestion that Jill, Merry, and Molly become missionaries in their homes furthers Jill’s transformation from masculinity to femininity. The girls, whose missions focus on domestic and self improvements, are characterized as both “savages” and “missionaries”. Through this project, Jill’s character is reformed, and not until this happens does she begin to recover. West views Jill’s eventual marriage to Jack as a reward for her transformation.

=== Education ===
Jill is at the head of her class, but struggles with spelling and grammar; Jack dislikes school but has good spelling and grammar. Hines claims this is demonstrative of their differing social statuses. Jill’s adoption into the Minot family raises her social status, and she starts calling Mrs. Minot “Mamma” while her biological mother’s presence fades. Mrs. Minot wants her boys to learn at home because she wants their studies to focus on physical and intellectual balance. Through this, Alcott opines that education and physical activity should go together. Mrs. Minot emphasizes good health in her sons because Frank prefers studying to physical activity and Jack’s newly-recovered leg needs exercise. Eventually studying less helps Frank sleep better at night. As part of her educational system for the children, Mrs. Minot helps them with in-depth study and discourages memorization. Molly, Merry, and Jill have a difficult time memorizing historical facts, so Mrs. Minot tells them stories from history while they sew. During the lessons, they make personal connections with what they learn. English professor Cathlin Davis points out Mrs. Minot’s previous work as a schoolteacher many years prior, and claims that Mrs. Minot teaches the children what they need at the time. Mrs. Minot's educational methods are based on Alcott's ideas of education, which were influenced by John Dewey, who advocated active learning. Her ideas were also influenced by her father Bronson Alcott, whose transcendental methods of teaching involved homeschooling and physical education.

== Adaptations ==
Iron founder S. Decatur Smith, Jr., wrote a short play for The Ladies' Home Journal based on Jack and Jill: A Village Story that is entitled "Jack and Jill: Founded on Portions of the Story by Louisa May Alcott”. Smith uses the Christmas celebration as the basis of the play. It begins with Mrs. Minot, Mrs. Pecq, and Ralph finishing decorating the Bird Room. Jack discovers the surprise upon entering the room, then invites Jill to join the Minots' Christmas party. A few of Jack's friends visit and they all write a letter to Jill. Later, they assist her to the Minots' house for the Christmas party. Jill sees the Bird Room and expresses appreciation. Afterward, Jack and Jill quarrel. When more of their friends come, Santa Claus arrives and passes out their presents. The play ends with the cast singing a Christmas song.

== Works cited ==
- Cheney, Edna Dow (2010). Louisa May Alcott: Her Life, Letters, and Journals. Carlisle, Massachusetts: Applewood Books. ISBN 978-1-4290-4460-8.
- Clark, Beverly Lyon, ed. (2004). "Jack and Jill: A Village Story (1880)". Louisa May Alcott: The Contemporary Reviews. Cambridge University Press. ISBN 0-521-82780-9.
- Davis, Cathlin M. (2011). "An Easy and Well-Ordered Way to Learn: Schooling at Home in Louisa May Alcott's Eight Cousins and Jack and Jill". Children's Literature in Education. 42 (4): 340–353. doi:10.1007/s10583-011-9136-1 – via Springer Link.
- Dowker, Ann (December 15, 2004). "The Treatment of Disability in 19th and Early 20th Century Children's Literature". Disability Studies Quarterly. 24 (1). doi:10.18061/dsq.v24i1.843. ISSN 2159-8371.
- Eiselein, Gregory (2000). "Reading a Feminist Romance: Literary Critics and Little Women". Children's Literature. 28. Johns Hopkins University Press: 238–244. doi:10.1353/chl.0.0167 – via Project MUSE.
- Hamblen, Abigail Ann (1970). "Louisa May Alcott and the 'Revolution' in Education". The Journal of General Education. 22 (2). Penn State University Press: 81–92. JSTOR 27796204.
- Hines, Maude (1999). "Missionary Positions: Taming the Savage Girl in Louisa May Alcott's Jack and Jill". The Lion and the Unicorn. 23 (3): 373–394. doi:10.1353/uni.1999.0031 – via Project MUSE.
- Kolba, Ellen D. (1984). "Out on a Limb". The English Journal. 73 (7): 38–41. doi:10.2307/817804. JSTOR 817804.
- Nelson, Claudia (1991). "What Katy Read: Susan Coolidge and the Image of the Victorian Child". Children's Literature Association Quarterly (1). Johns Hopkins University Press: 217–222. doi:10.1353/chq.1991.0021 – via Project MUSE.
- Payne, Alma J. (1980). Salzman, Jack (ed.). Louisa May Alcott: A Reference Guide. Boston, Massachusetts: G. K. Hall & Co. ISBN 0-8161-8032-6.
- Reisen, Harriet (2009). Louisa May Alcott: The Woman Behind Little Women. New York: Henry Holt and Company, LLC. ISBN 978-0-8050-8299-9.
- Shealy, Daniel (2004). "'Work Well Done': Louisa May Alcott and Mary Mapes Dodge". In Gannon, Susan R.; Rahn, Suzanne; Thompson, Ruth Anne (eds.). St. Nicholas and Mary Mapes Dodge: The Legacy of a Children's Magazine Editor, 1873–1905. McFarland and Company, Inc. pp. 171–178. ISBN 978-0-7864-1758-2.
- Smith, S. Decatur. Bok, Edward W. (ed.). "The Ladies' home journal v.24 1906–1907". HathiTrust. pp. 14, 73. hdl:2027/mdp.39015013140838.
- Stern, Madeleine B. Stern (1977). "Louisa M. Alcott in Periodicals". Studies in the American Renaissance. 1. Twayne Publishers: 369–386. JSTOR 30227439.
- Stern, Madeleine B. (1984). Critical Essays on Louisa May Alcott. Boston, Massachusetts: G. K. Hall & Co. ISBN 0-8161-8686-3.
- Ullom, Judith C., ed. (1969). Louisa May Alcott: An Annotated, Selected Bibliography. Washington, D.C.: Library of Congress. pp. 46–49.
- West, Kristina (2020). Louisa May Alcott and the Textual Child: A Critical Theory Approach. London: Palgrave Macmillan. doi:10.1007/978-3-030-39025-9. ISBN 978-3-030-39025-9.
