= Hospital Sketches =

1863 compilation of four stories based on letters by Louisa May Alcott

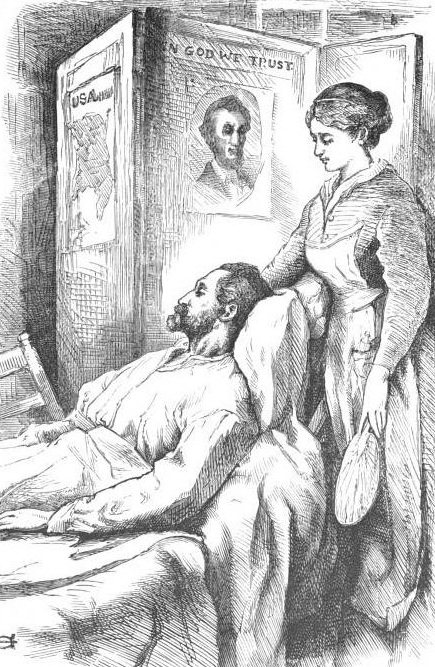
Illustration of John, a Virginia blacksmith, from a later edition of Hospital Sketches

Hospital Sketches (1863) is a compilation of four sketches based on letters Louisa May Alcott sent home during the six weeks she spent as a volunteer nurse for the Union Army during the American Civil War in Georgetown.

== Summary ==
Tribulation Periwinkle opens the story by complaining, "I want something to do." She dismisses suggestions to write a book, teach, get married, or start acting. When her younger brother suggests she "go nurse the soldiers", she immediately responds, "I will!" After substantial hardship in trying to obtain a spot, she has further difficulty finding a place on the train. She then describes her travel through New York, Philadelphia, and Baltimore en route to Washington DC.

Immediately after her arrival, Periwinkle must attend to the wounded from the Battle of Fredericksburg. Her first assignment is washing them before putting them to bed. She converses with the various wounded soldiers, including an Irishman and a Virginia blacksmith. The death of the blacksmith, a man named John, in particular touches her deeply.

== Composition and publication ==
After the Civil War broke out, the town of Concord, Massachusetts rallied, inspiring many young men to volunteer. The company assembled on the town common on April 19, 1861, the anniversary of the Battles of Lexington and Concord as they set off. Louisa May Alcott wrote to her friend Alf Whitman that it was "a sight to behold". She was disappointed that she had to stay behind, lamenting, "as I can't fight, I will content myself with working with those who can." She joined local women who volunteered to sew clothes and provide other supplies. On her 30th birthday on November 29, 1862, she made up her mind to do more. She recorded in her journal, "Thirty years old. Decide to go to Washington as a nurse if I could find a place." She received her orders on December 11 and made her way to Georgetown, outside of Washington, D.C. While working as a nurse, Alcott contracted typhoid fever and was treated with mercury in the form of calomel. She survived but later recorded: "I was never ill before this time, and never well afterward."

While serving as a nurse, Alcott wrote several letters to her family in Concord. At the urging of others, she prepared them for publication, slightly altering and fictionalizing them. The narrator of the stories was renamed Tribulation Periwinkle but the sketches are virtually authentic to Alcott's real experiences.

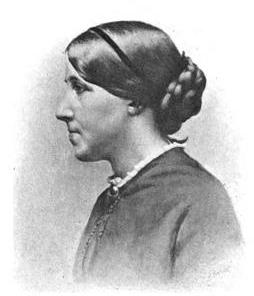
Louisa May Alcott in 1862

The first of the sketches was published on May 22, 1863, in the abolitionist magazine Boston Commonwealth edited by family friend Franklin Benjamin Sanborn. The final sketch was published on June 26. Alcott herself did not care much for the writings, dismissing the idea that they were "witty", and admitted, "I wanted money." The pieces received great critical and popular acclaim making Alcott an overnight success.

Transcendentalist Moncure D. Conway, who helped secure the publication of the sketches in the Commonwealth, recommended they be collected as a book. The author was approached by Thomas Niles, an up-and-coming employee of Roberts Brothers, to publish the sketches in book form. Instead, she turned to the more established publisher James Redpath, who paid her $40 for the book. At her father's suggestion, the book was dedicated to Hannah Stevenson, a friend who had helped Alcott secure her position as a volunteer nurse. The book, priced at 50 cents, earned the author five cents in royalties for every copy sold, with an additional five cents donated to children orphaned by the war. Years later, Walt Whitman contacted Redpath, hoping he would publish his own recollections as a Civil War nurse. As he wrote, the book Memoranda During the War, would be "something considerably more than mere hospital sketches."

Fourteen years later after its publication, Alcott reflected on avoiding Roberts Brothers, who later published Little Women (1868): "Shortsighted Louisa! Little did you dream that this same Roberts Brothers were to help you make your fortune a few years later." After that novel's success, Niles offered to republish Hospital Sketches under the Roberts Brothers imprint, and Alcott slightly expanded it.

== Reception ==
Louisa May Alcott's father Amos Bronson Alcott predicted the sketches "likely to be popular, the subject and style of treatment alike commending it to the reader, and to the Army especially. I see nothing in the way of a good appreciation of Louisa's merits as a woman and a writer. Nothing could be more surprising to her or agreeable to us." Her father was right; when it proved popular, Alcott was surprised by her own success. As she wrote: "I cannot see why people like a few extracts from topsey turvey letters written on inverted tea kettles, waiting for gruel to warm, or poultices to cool, [or] for boys to wake and be tormented." Henry James, Sr. wrote her a letter to applaud "her charming pictures of hospital service." The Boston Evening Transcript called the book "fluent and sparkling, with touches of quiet humor and lively wit". Alcott herself wrote: "I find I've done a good thing without knowing it."
