= Under the Lilacs =

1878 children's novel by Louisa May Alcott

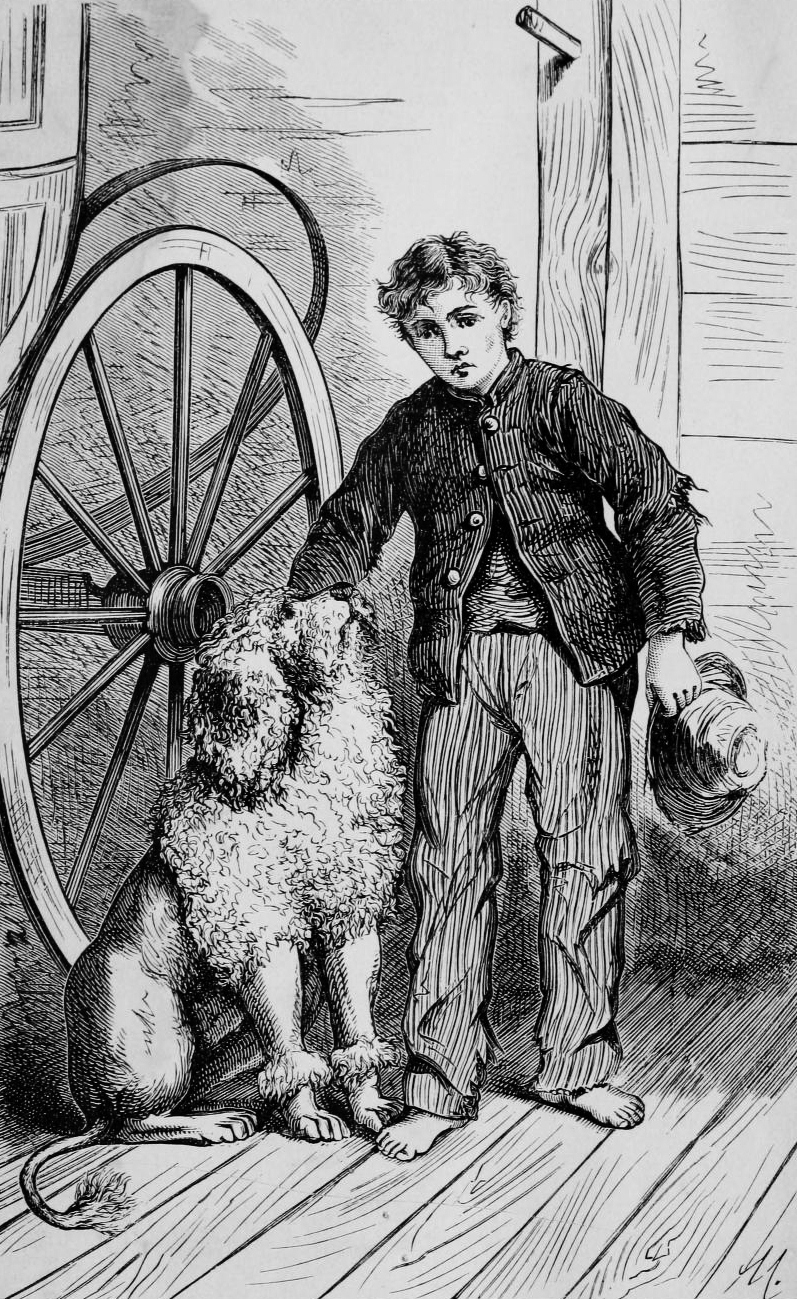
- "Ben and Sancho", illustration from an 1888 edition of Under the Lilacs
- Author: Louisa May Alcott
- Language: English
- Publisher: Roberts Brothers
- Publication date: 1878
- Publication place: United States
- Pages: 305 or 316

Under the Lilacs is a children's novel by Louisa May Alcott and is part of the Little Women Series. It was first published as a serialized story in St. Nicholas magazine in 1877–1878. It was first published in book form by Roberts Brothers in 1878. The plot follows twelve-year-old Ben Brown, a circus runaway who makes friends with the Moss family. He also becomes friends with Miss Celia and her brother Thornton, and Miss Celia eventually allows Ben to live at her house.

The novel's themes deal with characters' gender portrayal, home life, and moral lessons. Alcott, who wrote the novel while caring for her sick mother, struggled to come up with ideas for the story. During its composition she maintained correspondence with Mary Mapes Dodge. The book has been republished many times with new illustrations, receiving both praise and criticism in its early years.

== Background ==
=== Composition ===
In June 1877 Alcott sent a letter to Mary Mapes Dodge, the editor for St. Nicholas, informing her about the progress of Under the Lilacs. She wrote that the book was taking a long time because she was busy. She also expressed her hope that Mary Hallock Foote would illustrate the story in a satisfactory manner, saying that she did not like what her past illustrators drew. Foote's illustrations for Under the Lilacs depicted scenes with little action, resulting in Alcott's disappointment.

In the same letter Alcott told Dodge, "I am daily waiting with anxiety for an illumination of some sort, as my plot is very vague so far." She also mentioned that she included a poem written by F. B. Sanborn's young son, Francis, and expressed the desire for an illustration of that scene. Later, in September, she told Dodge that, if necessary, she could "take out all about 'Tennyson Jr'". Dodge chose to keep the poem.

In September 1877 Alcott finished the book while caring for her sick mother, Abby May. Alcott felt unsatisfied with the chapters written at that time, writing that they "are a sight for gods and men." She hoped that her heartache over Abby's death was unnoticeable in Under the Lilacs.

=== Editions ===
Under the Lilacs first appeared as a serialized edition in St. Nicholas between December 1877 and October 1878. It was published in book form by Roberts Brothers in 1878 and again in 1901 by Little, Brown with one additional illustration. In 1904 a Russian version with no illustrations was published by A. S. Panafidinoĭ. The English version was reprinted by Little, Brown in 1905 with new illustrations by Alice Barber Stephens. In 1928 Marguerite Davis created illustrations for another reprinting.

== Plot ==
Bab and Betty, two little girls, are having a tea party with their dolls when an unknown dog appears and steals their cake. A few days later, the girls find the dog, Sancho, along with his owner Ben Brown in the coach-house. Ben is a run-away from the circus where he was a horse master. In sharing his story, Ben reveals that he and his father worked at the circus until his father left in search of another job; after his father left, Ben was abused by his circus master, which led to him running away. Bab, Betty, and their widowed mother Mrs. Moss take Ben in and find him a job working on the Squire's farm. There, he works with horses and drive cows to pasture.

Miss Celia and her fourteen-year-old brother Thornton or "Thorny" move into the Elms, which is the house that Mrs. Moss takes care of. At first, Thorny is sick, too weak to walk, and irritable, but he eventually becomes friends with the children. Miss Celia also befriends the children, letting them play at her house. When Celia reveals to Ben that his father, Mr. Brown, is dead, she takes him into her home to raise him. Ben is then able to receive both an academic and a religious education.

On the Fourth of July, when Miss Celia and Thorny are gone, Ben and a few local boys sneak away to watch the circus. Bab and Sancho follow; Sancho gets lost and later is found by Betty. Meanwhile, Miss Celia gets hurt on her horse and is discovered by Ben. Ben is accused of stealing from Miss Celia, but he is proven innocent when the missing money is discovered in a mouse nest. Ben's father is alive and returns to him, Miss Celia marries her fiance, and Mr. Brown and Mrs. Moss get married a year later.

== Reception ==
Under the Lilacs received both positive and critical reviews in its early years of publication. Upon its serialized appearance in St. Nicholas, the magazine's editors wrote that "Alcott was created expressly to write stories for young people." Book Exchange Weekly wrote that the book was "the very best of Miss Alcott's books, better even than 'Little Women.'" In Rose-Belford's Canadian Monthly Review, George Stewart, Jr., wrote, "Every line sparkles with interest and reflected light."

Some readers were critical of Alcott's novel. They noted that "she permits girls to talk in something like slang, and with...inelegance that shocks the careful mamma." Another criticism was related to the characters' "slang, the untidy English, and even more strongly in the amateur lovemaking", stating that it was unnecessary for Miss Celia to daydream while reading a letter from her lover. W. W. Tulloch in The Academy called it "a stupid and vulgar story 'for young people'", and claimed that children would find little enjoyment in reading it.

== Themes ==
Journalist Kristina West suggests that Ben is first portrayed as being outside Victorian domesticity because of the absence of his parents. The union of Mr. Brown and Mrs. Moss, she says, restores domesticity within the book.

The Springfield Daily Republican wrote that in Under the Lilacs "[t]here is the same watchful and rigid moral tone which shows itself in Miss Alcott's books, by the frequent reminder of what virtue is and what it is not", but added that moral lessons do not overwhelm the story. McElaney suggests that Alcott attempts to teach a moral about disobedience by mentioning Ben's various difficulties after he sneaks to the circus.

== Analysis ==
Writer Hugh McElaney claims that Alcott reduces Ben's and Thornton's masculinity throughout the novel as "reconstruction of masculinity" in response to male domination in society. McElaney argues that, though Ben has "traditionally masculine traits", his former role as Cupid in the circus feminizes him. Ben is also "bow-legged"; according to McElaney, Ben attempts to preserve his masculinity by making physical comparisons between himself and Thornton. McElaney says that Thornton's lack of masculinity is manifest through Alcott's portrayal of his physical appearance, which is frail and fair, as well as his behavior. Thornton's lack of masculinity, he says, is also demonstrated when Thornton does not participate in rigorous physical activity.

Writer Frances Armstrong suggests that Bab and Betty play death-related games with their dolls as a way to cope with being patronized by others; Armstrong says that the girls appear to be unconscious of this.

== Works cited ==
- Anonymous (1905). "Children's Books". The Nation. 81 (2107): 406 – via Google Books.
- Armstrong, Frances (1992). "'Here Little, and Hereafter Bliss': Little Women and the Deferral of Greatness". American Literature. 64 (3). Duke University Press. doi:10.2307/2927747. JSTOR 2927747.
- Cheney, Edna Dow (2010). Louisa May Alcott: Her Life, Letters, and Journals. Carlisle, Massachusetts: Applewood Books. ISBN 978-1-4290-4460-8.
- Clark, Beverly Lyon, ed. (2004). "'Under the Lilacs' (1878)". Louisa May Alcott: The Contemporary Reviews. Cambridge University Press. ISBN 0-521-82780-9.
- Joseph, Michael S. (2004). "Illustrating St. Nicholas and the Influence of Mary Mapes Dodge". In Gannon, Susan R.; Rahn, Suzanne; Thompson, Ruth Anne (eds.). St. Nicholas and Mary Mapes Dodge: The Legacy of a Children's Magazine Editor, 1873–1905. McFarland and Company, Inc. pp. 65–72. ISBN 978-0-7864-1758-2.
- McElaney, Hugh (2006). "Alcott's Freaking of Boyhood: The Perplex of Gender and Disability in Under the Lilacs". Children's Literature. 3. The Johns Hopkins University Press: 139–160. doi:10.1353/chl.2006.0015 – via Project MUSE.
- Reisen, Harriet (2009). Louisa May Alcott: The Woman Behind Little Women. New York: Henry Holt and Company, LLC. ISBN 978-0-8050-8299-9.
- Shealy, Daniel (2004). "'Work Well Done':Louisa May Alcott and Mary Mapes Dodge". In Gannon, Susan R.; Rahn, Suzanne; Thompson, Ruth Anne (eds.). St. Nicholas and Mary Mapes Dodge: The Legacy of a Children's Magazine Editor, 1873–1905. McFarland and Company, Inc. pp. 171–178. ISBN 978-0-7864-1758-2.
- Stern, Madeleine B. (1985). "Louisa Alcott's Self-Criticism". Studies in the American Renaissance: 333–382. JSTOR 30227539.
- Stewart, George, ed. (1878). "Current Literature". Rose-Belford's Canadian Monthly Review. 1: 637 – via HathiTrust.
- Ullom, Judith C., ed. (1969). Louisa May Alcott: An Annotated, Selected Bibliography. Washington, D.C.: Library of Congress. pp. 46–49.
- West, Kristina (2020). "Subverting the Sentimental Domestic". Louisa May Alcott and the Textual Child: A Critical Theory Approach. London: Palgrave Macmillan. pp. 51–78. doi:10.1007/978-3-030-39025-9_3. ISBN 978-3-030-39024-2.
