= Lost in a Pyramid; or, The Mummy's Curse =

"Lost in a Pyramid; or, The Mummy's Curse" is a short story written by American author Louisa May Alcott and first published by Frank Leslie in 1869. Despite being largely overlooked throughout the twentieth century, "Lost in a Pyramid" was rediscovered in 1998 and has since become an influential example of early "mummy's curse" narratives.

== Background ==
Written in late 1868 or the first week of 1869, "Lost in a Pyramid" was among the last of Louisa May Alcott's short sensation thrillers. The influence of works such as her 1862 story "Pauline's Passion and Punishment" and her 1866 novella Behind a Mask, or A Woman's Power (published under the pseudonym A.M. Barnard) is shown through her continuing preoccupation with femme fatales, in this case a mummified sorceress. Alcott had praised such "blood & thunder tales" in an 1862 letter as "easy to 'compoze' and… better paid than moral & elaborate works of Shakespeare."

"Lost in a Pyramid" was first published in Frank Leslie's The New World under the initials L.M.A., alongside two engravings. Written concurrently with Little Women, Alcott's interest in Egypt carries over into the novel, where, according to The Louisa May Alcott Encyclopedia, Jo March "attends a lecture on the Pyramids, which inspires her to use exotic backdrops for modern sensation stories."

== Plot summary ==
After an expedition to Egypt with his colleague Professor Niles, Paul Forsyth returns to his fiancée Evelyn with a mysterious box of scarlet seeds. He warns her that the story of their origin will haunt her, but her naïve curiosity prevails.

Forsyth's tale begins when, despite fatigue and growing wariness, he follows the insatiable Niles deep into the Pyramid of Cheops. The two decide to lie in the sand and rest while Niles's guide, Jumal, seeks another guide to lead Forsyth to safety. Awaking alone, Forsyth plunges farther into the labyrinth in search of Niles, whom he finds lost and despairing. Niles breaks his leg in a fall, and, fearing for their lives, the two resolve to start a fire in order to signal Jumal. They burn a wooden coffin and unroll the wrappings of the mummified woman inside, where they discover the box of seeds. Despite strong reservations, Forsyth throws the mummy on the fire at Niles's command, Jumal rescues the hapless explorers, who have lost consciousness from the fumes. Forsyth keeps the box as a "souvenir" and Niles later deciphers a piece of parchment which identifies the woman as a powerful sorceress who has vowed to curse anyone who dares disturb her grave.

Evelyn asks to plant the seeds, but Forsyth throws them into the fireplace, fearing that they may be cursed or poisonous. He reveals that Niles has had bad luck since his return, but the happy lovers do not think much of it. Three months later, Forsyth remarks to Evelyn on their wedding day that she has grown frail and sickly. She confides that she feels she is dying, but he dismisses her ailment as bridal nerves. He reveals that one seed has escaped the fire after all, and after being sent to Niles, it has bloomed into an unusual white flower. She surprises him by revealing that she has grown her own strange flower in her boudoir and that she intends to wear it during the wedding, which he cautions against. She appears at the ceremony with renewed vivacity but later falls into a swoon, revealing the flower pinned to her clothes. An urgent letter arrives from a friend of Niles's, bringing news of the professor's death after wearing his own flower, which was later pronounced to be a lethal poison which drains the vitality of the wearer. Evelyn falls into a catatonic state of "death in life," and Forsyth secludes himself to tend to his insensate wife.

== Characters ==
- Paul Forsyth: A man haunted by a recent misadventure in the Pyramid of Cheops
- Evelyn: Forsyth's charming young bride-to-be, whose romantic curiosity about "weird stories" ultimately becomes her downfall
- Professor Niles: A fanatical explorer who risks grave danger in his pursuit of ancient artifacts
- Jumal: Forsyth and Niles's Egyptian guide

== Critical reception ==
Like most of Alcott's sensation fiction, "Lost in a Pyramid" received little attention throughout most of the twentieth century. Rediscovering the story in the late 1990s, Dominic Montserrat believed Alcott to be the first to use to utilize a fully fleshed-out "mummy's curse" narrative. However, Gregory Eiselein and Anne K. Phillips suggest that Alcott follows the plot of Theophile Gauthier's "The Mummy's Foot" (1847), conceding that the story is "an unusually early and female-authored example of the Egyptianizing thriller later dominated by male writers such as Bram Stoker, Arthur Conan Doyle, and H. Rider Haggard."

Conversely, Jasmine Day argues that the tradition in which Alcott writes was not always so male-centric, pointing to the anonymously published story "The Mummy's Soul" (1862) and Jane G. Austin's "After Three Thousand Years" (1868), where female mummies exact revenge on male desecrators. Day proposes that along with Alcott's, these protofeminist curse stories establish "an analogy between desecration of tombs and rape."
