= A Modern Mephistopheles =

1877 novel by Louisa May Alcott

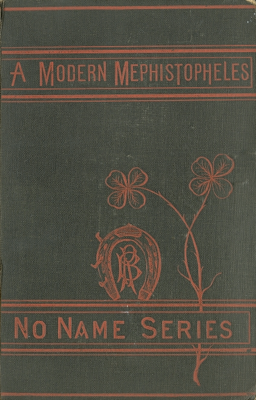
- "No Name Series" edition of A Modern Mephistopheles
- Author: Louisa May Alcott
- Language: English
- Publisher: Roberts Brothers.
- Publication date: 1877
- Publication place: United States

A Modern Mephistopheles is a gothic thriller published by the Roberts Brothers in 1877 and written by Louisa May Alcott. It is based on Goethe's Faust and contains stylistic elements Alcott used earlier in her writing career. The novel follows Felix Canaris and Gladys, two young people whose lives are manipulated by a wealthy semi-invalid Jasper Helwyze, who seeks to undermine their relationship for psychological experimentation. Under Helwyze's direction, Canaris and Gladys marry. Gladys and Canaris eventually overcome Helwyze's influence on them.

A Modern Mephistopheles received both positive and negative reviews during its early publication. It was noted for its discussions on psychology as well as the symbolism of the characters. Newspaper and journal reviews claimed it was unpleasant to read while acknowledging that parts of it were interesting. A Modern Mephistopheles uses Greek myths and art to discuss character relations, and it also explicitly references The Scarlet Letter, Arthurian legends, and Faust. Analysis of the novel has included femininity and gendered relationships with art.

== Background ==
A Modern Mephistopheles first appeared in the No Name Series, in which writers adopted styles other than their own and readers were meant to guess the author. Alcott wrote, "This book was very successful in preserving its incognito; and many persons still insist that it could not have been written by the author of 'Little Women'." Alcott remained anonymous until 1889, when the book was included in A Whisper in the Dark.

Alcott came up with the idea for the book after reading Faust, describing it as an attempt "at something graver than magazine stories or juvenile literature". In writing the novel, Alcott reused passages from her work "The Freak of a Genius" and a novel with a similar name, A Modern Mephistopheles; or, The Fatal Love Chase. Alcott liked the break from writing "moral pap for the young", instead using the style of sensation novels—a style she used under her early pseudonym A. M. Barnard.

== Plot ==
Nineteen-year-old Felix Canaris burns his unsuccessful poetry and attempts suicide, but he is stopped by a stranger named Jasper Helwyze who invites Canaris to become the secretary of his personal library. Helwyze offers to let Canaris publish Helwyze's poetry under his own name to help his career. This allows Helwyze to control Canaris by threatening to reveal the true author of the poems.

One year later, Canaris talks in the garden with Gladys, an eighteen-year-old orphan. She expresses her interest in the now-published poetry. Even though Canaris is famous, he feels his fame is insufficient. He explains to Gladys that Helwyze lived successfully until he fell and was badly injured; because he was injured, his fiancée married someone else. In turn, Gladys explains that she lives with Helwyze's former fiancée, Olivia Surry, who is now widowed and in love with Helwyze. Meanwhile, Helwyze suggests to Olivia that they encourage Canaris to marry Gladys. Canaris says he wants to wait for marriage but agrees to the plan when Helwyze threatens to reveal the poetry's true authorship. Helwyze wants Canaris to marry Gladys, but Canaris wants to marry Olivia. They agree that if Olivia refuses Canaris's love, Helwyze can do what he wants with him. While Canaris declares his love to Olivia, Gladys visits Helwyze and mentions she will have to leave Olivia. Helwyze offers to take her in if she nurses him in his semi-invalid state.

Rejected by Olivia, Canaris turns to courting Gladys. When Canaris refuses to marry her, Helwyze says he will discontinue mentoring Canaris and marry her himself. Canaris becomes jealous and decides to marry Gladys. When they return from their honeymoon, he begins writing again and Gladys becomes Helwyze's companion. He enjoys her company and attempts to distract her from her Christian beliefs and her devotion to Canaris. Gladys discovers Canaris on the verge of destroying a book in discouragement and convinces him to publish it.

After Helwyze's book is published under Canaris's name, Canaris is again famous and spends most of his time in society. Gladys discovers that he has been gambling, and when she brings it up to him they decide to spend more time together in hopes of reducing Helwyze's influence. Helwyze becomes jealous of the couple. At his bidding, Olivia returns to distract Canaris from his newly found love for Gladys. Because Gladys refuses to express her disappointment, Helwyze secretly gives her hashish. After Gladys and Olivia act out sections from Idylls of the King, Gladys succumbs to the hashish and falls asleep. While she sleeps, Helwyze puts her into a trance and questions her, finding out that she fears his love and desires his death.

Canaris again devotes himself to Gladys while maintaining a friendship with Olivia. When Olivia finds out Gladys is pregnant, she confesses that her interactions with Canaris were for personal enjoyment, then suggests the couple take a trip to get away from Helwyze. Later, Helwyze attempts to get Gladys to doubt her husband's fidelity, and she asks him to stop. After she and Canaris return from their trip, they discover Helwyze is ill. Eventually Canaris overhears Helwyze trying to influence Gladys's feelings toward him. He wants to murder Helwyze, but Gladys stops him and Canaris reveals that Helwyze wrote all of his books. Shortly after, Gladys delivers her baby and both die; Canaris blames himself for their deaths and resolves to make an honest living. Meanwhile, Helwyze, paralyzed, is unable to influence Canaris and regrets his intervention.

== Reception ==
Reviews in The Commonwealth and North American Review guessed that the author was a woman. Godey's Lady's Book speculated that the book was written by a female with little experience who later "may make her mark". Other guesses as to the book's authorship included Julian Hawthorne, Harriet Prescott Spofford, and Louisa May Alcott. Upon discovering the authorship, Public Opinion expressed surprise, writing that the style differed from what Alcott typically used but that the "tone ... and lofty moral purpose" were unchanged.

According to Madeleine B. Stern, Alcott was more satisfied with A Modern Mephistopheles than the public was. The Daily Evening Traveller wrote about similarities between Alcott's and Hawthorne's characters, noting that Alcott's were "only inferior ... in psychological depiction". The Springfield Daily Republican predicted it would not sell well and called it "a disagreeable story" with "a certain degree of interest". The Boston Courier predicted that it would be popular among other works in the No Name Series. Hartford Daily Courant described it as "strange, mythical, and unsatisfactory", while The Woman's Journal called it "thrilling, weird, and intense".

== Intertextuality ==
=== Faust and The Scarlet Letter ===
A Modern Mephistopheles begins with a section from Faust that reads, "The Indescribable, / Here it is done: / The woman-soul leadeth us / Upward and on!" As in Faust, A Modern Mephistopheles contains "the tempter, the temptation, [and] the tempted one". Helwyze is compared to Mephistopheles, Olivia to Martha, Canaris to Faust, and Gladys to Margaret, or Gretchen. As a Mephistopheles figure, Helwyze tempts Canaris and Gladys in order to learn about human nature and psychology. Rena Sanderson analyzes Alcott's mentions of Faust, Greek tragedies, and Dante in chapter one as symbolic of Canaris's character fall. Alcott's continued references to Greek myths, Faust, and King Arthur legends deal with a woman's point of view by focusing on the female characters rather than the male characters.

A Modern Mephistopheles also includes references to and analysis of The Scarlet Letter in a conversation between Gladys and Helwyze. In the conversation, they discuss the characters' motivations of love and hate in The Scarlet Letter. Montclair State University English professor Monika Elbert views the conversation as representative of the relationship between the characters in Alcott's novel and compares Gladys, Canaris, and Helwyze to Hester, Dimmesdale, and Chillingworth, respectively.

=== Greek mythology ===
Helwyze calls Canaris and Gladys Ganymede and Hebe. He also calls Canaris his "Greek slave", which Elbert explains is an allusion to the Greek Slave statue by Hiram Powers. A professor of American literary and cultural studies at the University of Oldenburg, Michaela Keck describes Helwyze and Canaris's relationship as Pygmalionist, where Helwyze is the creator and Canaris is the creation. Helwyze "represents the dualism of mind and matter as well as the confusion between creator and created, subject and object". Gladys is characterized as Galatea, but her death disconnects her as Helwyze's creation. This makes the male creators passive.

== Analysis ==
=== Femininity ===
Holly Blackford, Monika Elbert, Michaela Keck, Mary Chapman, and Rena Sanderson analyzed A Modern Mephistopheles in light of femininity in Alcott's time. Keck explains that the novel takes a Neoplatonic view on female sexuality, which views female sexuality as having a proper place in society. Keck argues that Alcott was advocating for societal acceptance of female sexuality. Boise State University English professor Rena Sanderson discusses Canaris as representative of Alcott's submission to a male-based society and discusses Gladys as representative of Alcott's autonomy. University of British Columbia English professor Mary Chapman describes Helwyze's influence as "objectifying" and "controlling". Eventually Gladys gains influence over him when she turns his methods onto himself, in which she objectifies and controls him in return.

Olivia and Gladys act out four sections from Idylls of the King, a play by Alfred Tennyson. In the first section, Gladys portrays Enid, who sings about humility and pride. In the second section, Olivia portrays Merlin and Gladys portrays Vivien, who tricks Merlin into thinking she loves him. The first two sections, Chapman explains, demonstrate the impact of the women's influence on their male listeners, Helwyze and Canaris. In the last two sections the women take "more traditional female roles" in the characters they choose to portray. Gladys portrays a nun while Olivia portrays Queen Guinevere; Olivia then leaves the stage and Gladys portrays Elaine of Astolat. While Gladys and Olivia do not comment on their intentions, Chapman interprets this section of the novel as a criticism of women's passivity in society in Alcott's time. Blackford, who is an English professor at Rutgers University-Camden, and Sanderson write that Gladys's motherhood is redemptive, in that she gains authority over the other characters and redeems Canaris from the effects of Helwyze's influence. Elbert explains that Gladys "achieve[s] power" through "moral power in the household".

Keck noticed a pattern of female suffering and empathy. Suffering is represented in what Keck calls Gladys's "victimization" throughout the novel. In A Modern Mephistopheles Gladys reads the book that Canaris is about to destroy and asks him to have the female lead die rather than the male protagonist. According to Keck, this signifies female heroism through suffering and parallels Gladys's own death. Elbert sees Gladys's death as signifying her "control" over her body because it takes control away from the other characters. Her death, says Sanderson, reshapes Helwyze's household. Sanderson points this to female influence. Chapman views Gladys's death as reflective of what was popular in literature at the time.

=== Relationships with art ===
Chapman argues that A Modern Mephistopheles is "not a celebration of the subtle victory of womanly influence over male vice so much as a mapping out" of how gender roles affect art. The characters, she says, view the creation of art as masculine and art itself as feminine. Sanderson argues that in A Modern Mephistopheles Alcott is advocating female creativity in society. At first excluded from the making of art, Gladys eventually exercises power over others through the art of acting. During the play she is an "active artist" and her death at the end of the novel prevents her from becoming passive in art. Gladys, Elbert explains, participates little in writing as an art until she tells Canaris how to end the book. Until then she is the audience and not the creator of art.

== Works cited ==
- Alcott, Louisa May (1889). A Modern Mephistopheles and A Whisper in the Dark. Roberts Brothers – via Project Gutenberg.
- Blackford, Holly (2011). "Chasing Amy: Mephistopheles, the Laurence Boy, and Louisa May Alcott's Punishment of Female Ambition". Frontiers: A Journal of Women Studies. 32 (3). University of Nebraska Press: 1–40. doi:10.1353/fro.2011.a461363 – via Project MUSE.
- Chapman, Mary (1996). "Gender and Influence in Louisa May Alcott's A Modern Mephistopheles". Legacy. 13 (1): 19–37. JSTOR 25679183.
- Cheney, Edna Dow (2010). Louisa May Alcott: Her Life, Letters, and Journals. Carlisle, Massachusetts, US: Applewood Books. ISBN 978-1-4290-4460-8.
- Clark, Beverly Lyon, ed. (2004). "A Modern Mephistopheles (1877)". Louisa May Alcott: The Contemporary Reviews. Cambridge University Press. ISBN 0-521-82780-9.
- Elbert, Monika (2008). "Dying to Be Heard: Morality and Aesthetics in Alcott's and Hawthorne's Tableaux Morts". In Dill, Elizabeth; Weinstein, Sheri (eds.). Death Becomes Her : Cultural Narratives of Femininity and Death in Nineteenth-century America. Cambridge Scholars Publishing. pp. 19–36. ISBN 9781847185617.
- Keck, Michaela (2016). "Of Marble Women and Sleeping Nymphs: Louisa May Alcott's A Modern Mephistopheles". In Pestell, Ben; Palazzolo, Pietra; Burnett, Leon (eds.). Translating Myth. Oxfordshire, England, UK: Routledge. pp. 144–160. ISBN 978-1-315543-20-8.
- Payne, Alma J. (1980). Salzman, Jack (ed.). Louisa May Alcott: A Reference Guide. Boston, Massachusetts, US: G. K. Hall & Co. ISBN 0-8161-8032-6.
- Sanderson, Rena (1991). "A Modern Mephistopheles: Louisa May Alcott's Exorcism of Patriarchy". American Transcendental Quarterly. 5 (1): 41–55. ProQuest 1302638905.
- Stern, Madeleine B. (1949). "Louisa M. Alcott: An Appraisal". The New England Quarterly. 22 (4): 475–498. doi:10.2307/361945. JSTOR 361945.
- Ullom, Judith C., ed. (1969). Louisa May Alcott: An Annotated, Selected Bibliography. Washington, D. C.: Library of Congress. pp. 46–49.
