= Sarah Elbert =

American literary historian

- Born: 5 January 1936; New York
- Died: 3 August 2019; Ithaca, New York
- Education: Cornell University (B.A., M.A., Ph.D.)
- Occupation: Literary historian

Sarah Elbert (January 5, 1936 - August 3, 2019) was an American literary historian.

== Life and work ==
Sarah Elbert was born in New York to a mixed-race family on 5 January 1936. She attended Cornell University, earning a B.A. magna cum laude with honors in history in 1965, despite becoming a single mother the year previously. She completed all of her graduate work at Cornell as well, earning a M.A. in teaching in 1966, a master's degree in history in 1968, and a Ph.D. in history in 1974. While in graduate school, Elbert participated in Students for a Democratic Society, the Union for Radical Political Economics, and the Congress of Racial Equality, as well as protesting against the Vietnam War. She later made a documentary film on the week of the 1968 Democratic National Convention entitled, The Streets Belong to the People.

Elbert was hired as a visiting assistant professor in 1973 at Binghamton University and remained there for the rest of her career. Her appointment was regularized when she received her Ph.D the following year, and she was promoted to associate professor in 1981. "The author or editor of six books, Elbert is best known for her work on Louisa May Alcott, which originated with her dissertation. When graduate student Elbert reread Little Women, which she had read as a child, she realized that it contained a subtext that 'dealt with issues of women’s rights, of slavery and other social reforms.'"
