= Flower Fables =

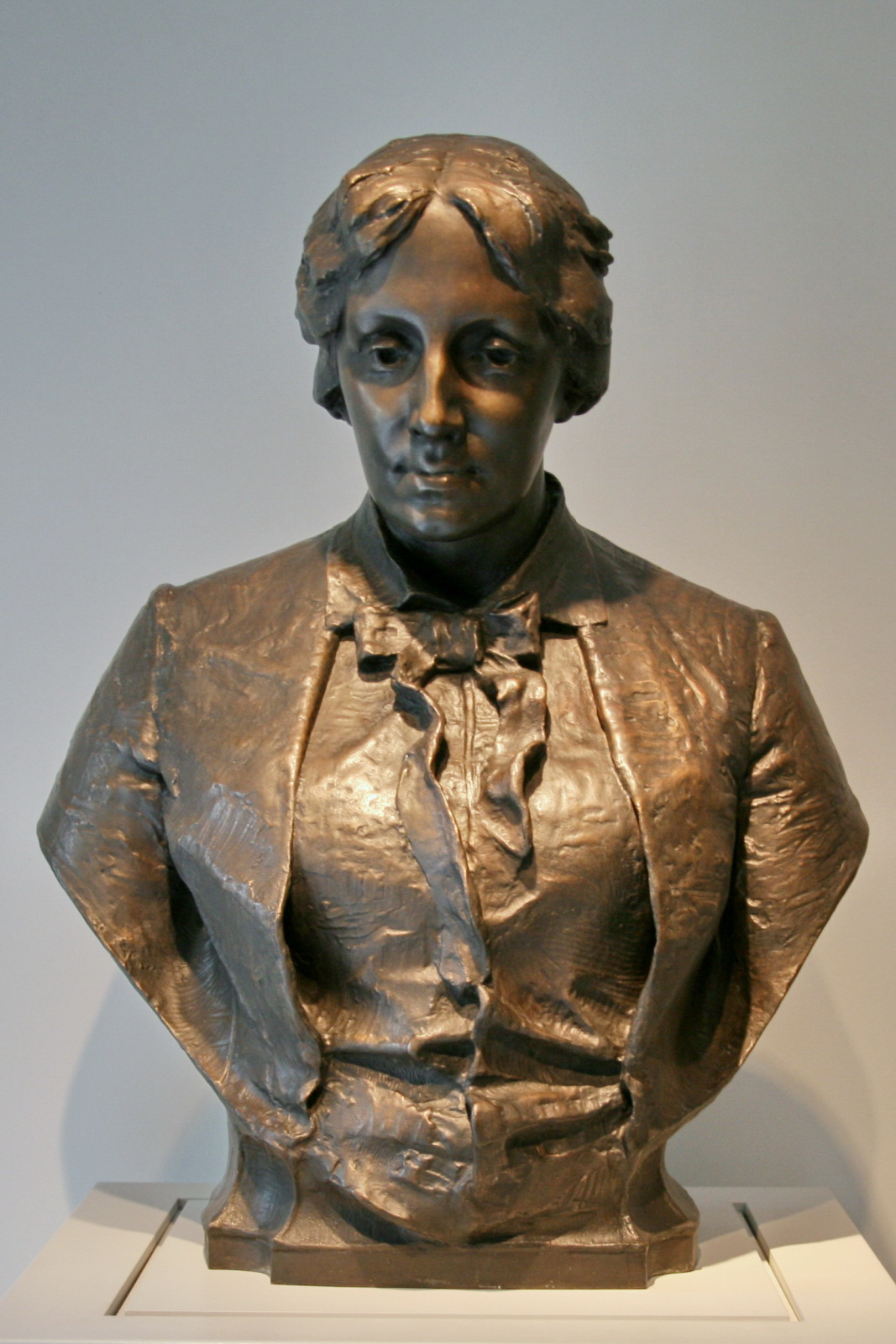
Louisa May Alcott, 1967 cast after 1891 original, bronze cast after Frank Edwin Elwell, Foundry Roman Bronze Works, Inc.

Flower Fables was the first work published by Louisa May Alcott and appeared on December 9, 1854. The book was a compilation of fanciful stories first written six years earlier for Ellen Emerson (daughter of Ralph Waldo Emerson). The book was published in an edition of 1600 and though Alcott thought it "sold very well", she received only about $35 from the Boston publisher, George Briggs.

== Bibliography ==
- Matteson, John. "Eden's Outcasts: The Story of Louisa May Alcott and her Father". W. W. Norton & Company, Inc, New York, New York, 2007. ISBN 978-0-393-05964-9.
