= The Brownie and the Princess =

Book by Louisa May Alcott

- 2004 edition (publ. HarperCollins)
- Author: Louisa May Alcott

The Brownie and the Princess: And Other Stories (ISBN 978-0060000837) is a book of ten children's stories by the American author, Louisa May Alcott (1832–1888). The stories were published in various children's magazines during her lifetime. They were also previously published with two other stories in the collection A Round Dozen by Viking Press in 1963. HarperCollins published an edition in 2004.

== Synopsis ==
The Brownie and the Princess, the first of the stories, is about a young farmer girl, named Betty, who lives with her father. Since her mother has died, and, since she has no friends, she learns to talk to the birds and use all of her resources to survive. She milks her cow and roams in the fields all day long, talking to the squirrels, birds, bunnies and every living creature around her. One day, she overhears the birds talking about how the Princess is planning to visit her and make friends with Betty, whom they call the Brownie, because she is always dressed in a brown gown and hat. She is an animal lover, and the short story is all about how she teaches the Princess not to be spoiled, but to love the world around her and to help the animals. Once she has befriended the Princess, she teaches the Princess her real values and tells her that she must love the earth and care for it.

== Stories ==
- The Brownie and the Princess
- Tabby's Tablecloth
- A Hole in the Wall
- Lunch
- Baa! Baa!
- The Silver Party
- How They Camped Out
- The Hare and the Tortoise
- Jerseys, or the Girl's Ghost
- The Cooking Class
