= Louisa May Alcott =

American novelist (1832–1888)

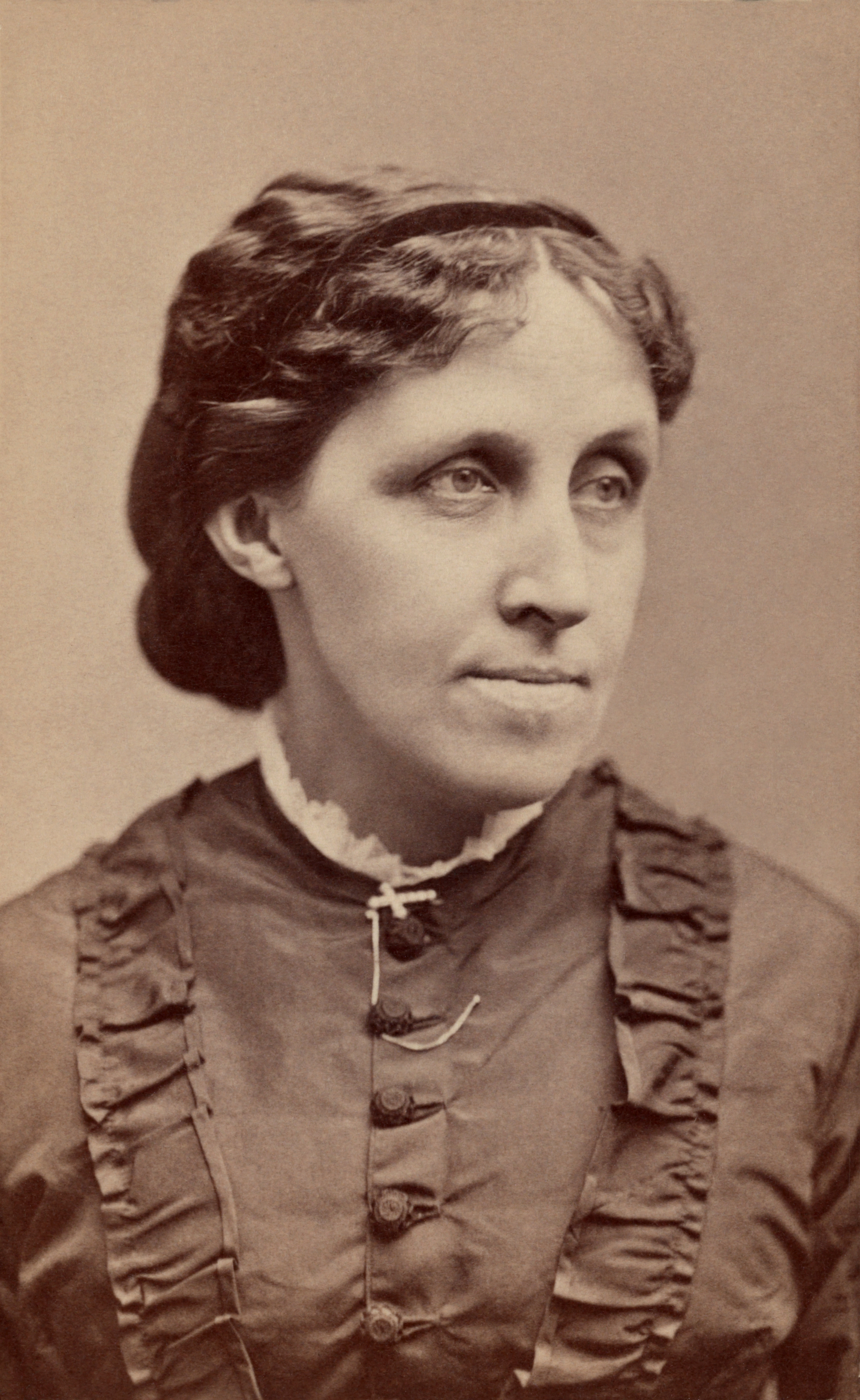
- Alcott, c. 1870
- Born: November 29, 1832; Germantown, Pennsylvania, U.S.
- Died: March 6, 1888 (aged 55); Boston, Massachusetts, U.S.
- Resting place: Sleepy Hollow Cemetery, Concord, Massachusetts, U.S.
- Occupation: Novelist
- Writing career
- Pen name: A. M. Barnard
- Period: American Civil War
- Genres: Prose; poetry
- Subject: Young adult fiction
- Works related to Louisa May Alcott at Wikisource

Louisa May Alcott (/ˈɔːlkət/ AWL-kət; November 29, 1832 – March 6, 1888) was an American novelist, short story writer, and poet best known for writing the novel Little Women (1868) and its sequels Good Wives (1869), Little Men (1871), and Jo's Boys (1886). Raised in New England by her transcendentalist parents, Abigail May and Amos Bronson Alcott, she grew up among many well-known intellectuals of the day, including Margaret Fuller, Ralph Waldo Emerson, Nathaniel Hawthorne, and Henry David Thoreau. Encouraged by her family, Alcott began writing from an early age.

Alcott's family experienced financial hardship, and while Alcott took on various jobs to help support the family from an early age, she also sought to earn money by writing. In the 1860s she began to achieve critical success for her writing with the publication of Hospital Sketches, a book based on her service as a nurse in the American Civil War. Early in her career, she sometimes used pen names such as A. M. Barnard, under which she wrote lurid short stories and sensation novels for adults. Little Women was one of her first successful novels and has been adapted for film and television. It is loosely based on Alcott's childhood experiences with her three sisters, Abigail May Alcott Nieriker, Elizabeth Sewall Alcott, and Anna Alcott Pratt.

Alcott was an abolitionist and a feminist and remained unmarried throughout her life. She also spent her life active in reform movements such as temperance and women's suffrage. During the last eight years of her life she raised the daughter of her deceased sister. She died from a stroke in Boston on March 6, 1888, just two days after her father's death and was buried in Sleepy Hollow Cemetery. Louisa May Alcott has been the subject of numerous biographies, novels, and a documentary, and has influenced other writers and public figures such as Theodore Roosevelt and Ursula K. Le Guin.

== Early life ==
=== Birth and early childhood ===
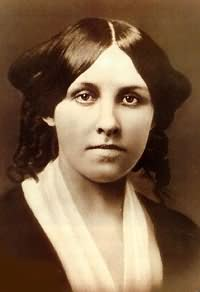
Louisa May Alcott at age 20

Louisa May Alcott was born on November 29, 1832, in Germantown, now part of Philadelphia, Pennsylvania. Her parents were transcendentalist and educator Amos Bronson Alcott and social worker Abigail (Abba) May Alcott. Alcott was the second of four daughters, with Anna as the eldest and Elizabeth and May as the youngest. Alcott was named after her mother's sister, Louisa May Greele, who had died four years earlier. After Alcott's birth, Bronson kept a record of her development, noting her strong will, which she may have inherited from her mother May's side of the family. He described her as "fit for the scuffle of things".

The family moved to Boston in 1834, where Alcott's father established the experimental Temple School and met with other transcendentalists such as Ralph Waldo Emerson and Henry David Thoreau. Bronson participated in child-care but often failed to provide income, creating conflict in the family. At home and in school he taught morals and improvement, while Abigail emphasized imagination and supported Alcott's writing at home. With all the commotion going on at the time, writing helped her handle her emotions. Alcott was often tended by her father's friend Elizabeth Peabody, and later she frequently visited Temple School during the day.

Alcott kept a journal from an early age. Bronson and Abigail often read it and left short messages for her on her pillow. She was a tomboy who preferred boys' games and preferred to be friends with boys or other tomboys. She wanted to play sports with the boys at school but was not allowed to.

Alcott was primarily educated by her father, who established a strict schedule and believed in "the sweetness of self-denial." When Alcott was still too young to attend school, Bronson taught her the alphabet by forming the letter shapes with his body and having her repeat their names. For a time she was educated by Sophia Foord, whom she would later eulogize. She was also instructed in biology and Native American history by Thoreau, who was a naturalist, while Emerson mentored her in literature. Alcott had a particular fondness for Thoreau and Emerson; as a young girl, they were both "sources of romantic fantasies for her." Her favorite authors included Harriet Beecher Stowe, Sir Walter Scott, Fredericka Bremer, Thomas Carlyle, Nathaniel Hawthorne, Goethe, John Milton, Friedrich Schiller, and Germaine de Staele.

=== Hosmer Cottage ===
External videos
- Tour of Orchard House, June 19, 2017, C-SPAN

In 1840, after several setbacks with Temple School and a brief stay in Scituate, the Alcotts moved to Hosmer Cottage in Concord. Emerson, who had convinced Bronson to move his family to Concord, paid rent for the family, who were often in need of financial help. While living there, Alcott and her sisters befriended the Hosmer, Goodwin, Emerson, Hawthorne, and Channing children, who lived nearby. The Hosmer and Alcott children put on plays and often included other children. Alcott and Anna also attended school at the Concord Academy, though for a time Alcott attended a school for younger children held at the Emerson house. At eight years old, Alcott wrote her first poem, "To the First Robin". When she showed the poem to her mother, Abigail was pleased.

In October 1842, Bronson returned from a visit to schools in England and brought Charles Lane and Henry Wright with him to live at Hosmer Cottage, while Bronson and Lane made plans to establish a "New Eden". The children's education was undertaken by Lane, who implemented a strict schedule. Alcott disliked Lane and found the new living arrangements difficult.

=== Fruitlands and Hillside ===
In 1843, Bronson and Lane established Fruitlands, a utopian community, in Harvard, Massachusetts, where the family were to live. Alcott later described these early years in a newspaper sketch titled "Transcendental Wild Oats", reprinted in Silver Pitchers (1876), which relates the family's experiment in "plain living and high thinking" at Fruitlands. There, Alcott enjoyed running outdoors and found happiness in writing poetry about her family, elves, and spirits. She later reflected with distaste on the amount of work she had to do outside of her lessons. She also enjoyed playing with Lane's son William and often put on fairy-tale plays or performances of Charles Dickens's stories. She read works by Dickens, Plutarch, Lord Byron, Maria Edgeworth, and Oliver Goldsmith.

During the demise of Fruitlands, the Alcotts discussed whether or not the family should separate. Alcott recorded this in her journal and expressed her unhappiness should they separate. After the collapse of Fruitlands in early 1844, the family rented in nearby Still River, where Alcott attended public school and wrote and directed plays that her sisters and friends performed.

In April 1845, the family returned to Concord, where they bought a home they called Hillside with money Abigail inherited from her father. Here, Alcott and her sister Anna attended a school run by John Hosmer after a period of home education. The family again lived near the Emersons, and Alcott was granted open access to the Emerson library, where she read Carlyle, Dante, Shakespeare, and Goethe. In the summer of 1848, sixteen-year-old Alcott opened a school of twenty students in a barn near Hillside. Her students consisted of the Emerson, Channing, and Alcott children.

The two oldest Alcott girls continued acting in plays written by Alcott. While Anna preferred portraying calm characters, Alcott preferred the roles of villains, knights, and sorcerers. These plays later inspired Comic Tragedies (1893). The family struggled without income beyond the girls' sewing and teaching. Eventually, some friends arranged a job for Abigail and three years after moving into Hillside, the family moved to Boston. Hillside was sold to Nathaniel Hawthorne in 1852. Alcott described the three years she spent at Concord as a child as the "happiest of her life."

=== Boston ===
When the Alcott family moved to the South End of Boston in 1848, Alcott had work as a teacher, seamstress, governess, domestic helper, and laundress, to earn money for the family. Together, Alcott and her sister taught a school in Boston, though Alcott disliked teaching. Her sisters also supported the family by working as seamstresses, while their mother took on social work among the Irish immigrants. Elizabeth and May were able to attend public school, though Elizabeth later left school to undertake the housekeeping. Due to financial pressures, writing became a creative and emotional outlet for Alcott. In 1849 she created a family newspaper, the Olive Leaf, named after the local Olive Branch. The family newspaper included stories, poems, articles, and housekeeping advice. It was later renamed to The Portfolio. She also wrote her first novel, The Inheritance, which was published posthumously and based on Jane Eyre. Alcott, who was driven to escape poverty, wrote, "I wish I was rich, I was good, and we were all a happy family this day."

== Early adulthood ==
=== Life in Dedham ===
Abigail ran an intelligence office to help the destitute find employment. When James Richardson came to Abigail in the winter of 1851 seeking a companion for his frail sister and elderly father who would also be willing to do light housekeeping, Alcott volunteered to serve in the house filled with books, music, artwork, and good company on Highland Avenue. Alcott may have imagined the experience as something akin to being a heroine in a Gothic novel, as Richardson described their home in a letter as stately but decrepit.

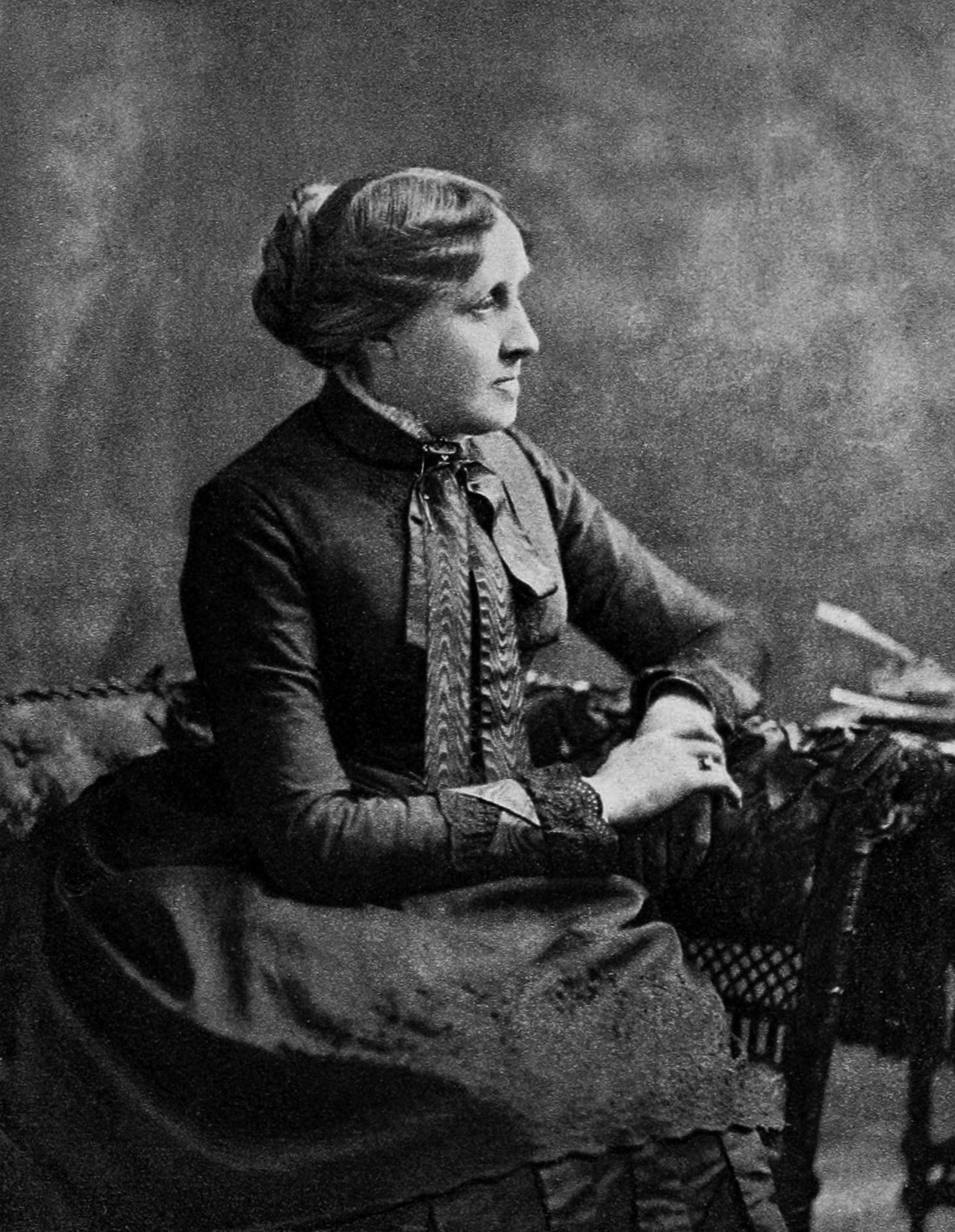
Louisa May Alcott

Richardson's sister, Elizabeth, was 40 years old and suffered from neuralgia. She was shy and did not seem to have much use for Alcott. Instead, Richardson spent hours reading her poetry and sharing his philosophical ideas with her. She reminded Richardson that she was hired to be Elizabeth's companion and expressed that she was tired of listening to his "philosophical, metaphysical, and sentimental rubbish." Richardson's response was to assign her more laborious duties, including chopping wood, scrubbing the floors, shoveling snow, drawing water from the well, and blacking his boots.

Alcott quit after seven weeks, when neither of the two girls her mother sent to replace her decided to take the job. As she walked from Richardson's home to Dedham station, she opened the envelope he had handed her with her pay. One account states that she was so unsatisfied with the four dollars she found inside that she mailed the money back to him in contempt. Another account states that Bronson may have returned the money himself and rebuked Richardson. Alcott later wrote a slightly fictionalized account of her time in Dedham titled "How I Went Out To Service", which she submitted to Boston publisher James T. Fields. Fields rejected the piece, telling Alcott that she had no future as a writer.

=== Early publications ===
In September 1851, Alcott's poem "Sunlight" appeared in Peterson's Magazine under the name Flora Fairchild, making it her first successful publication. 1852 marked the publication of her first story, "The Rival Painters: A Tale of Rome", which was published in the Olive Branch. In 1854, she attended The Boston Theatre, where she was given a pass to attend free of charge. She published her first book, Flower Fables, in 1854; the book was a selection of tales she originally told to Ellen Emerson, daughter of Ralph Waldo Emerson. Lidian Emerson had read the stories and encouraged Alcott to publish them. Though she was pleased, Alcott hoped to eventually shift her writing "from fairies and fables to men and realities". She also wrote The Rival Prima Donnas, a play adaptation of her story with the same title.

In 1855, the Alcotts moved to Walpole, New Hampshire, where Alcott and Anna participated in the Walpole Amateur Dramatic Company. Alcott was praised for her "superior histrionic ability". At the end of the theater season, Alcott, encouraged by the success of Flower Fables, began writing Christmas Elves, a collection of Christmas stories illustrated by May Alcott. In November Alcott traveled to Boston and attempted to publish the collection while living with a relative. November was too late in the year to publish Christmas books and Alcott was unable to publish The Christmas Elves. She then wrote and published "The Sisters' Trial", a story about four women who were based on the Alcott sisters.

=== Family changes ===
Alcott returned to Walpole in mid-1856 to find her sister Elizabeth ill with scarlet fever. Alcott helped nurse Elizabeth, and when she was not nursing helped with the housekeeping and wrote. Alcott prepared to publish Beach Bubbles that year, but the book was rejected. By the end of the year she was writing for the Olive Branch, the Ladies Enterprise, The Saturday Evening Gazette, and the Sunday News. Alcott again lived in Boston for a time, where she met Julia Ward Howe and Frank Sanborn. In the summer of 1857 Alcott and Anna rejoined the Walpole Amateur Dramatic Company and sought to entertain Elizabeth with stories about their acting. The family later visited Swampscott in an effort to boost Elizabeth's health, which was poor from effects of the scarlet fever, but it did not improve. During this time Alcott read The Life of Charlotte Brontë by Elizabeth Gaskell and found inspiration from Brontë's life.

The family moved back to Concord in September 1857, where the Alcotts rented while Bronson repaired Orchard House. During that time, the two oldest Alcott sisters organized the Concord Dramatic Union. Elizabeth Alcott died on March 14, 1858, when she was twenty-three. Three weeks later, Anna became engaged to John Pratt, a man she met in the Concord Dramatic Union. Alcott experienced depression about these events and considered Elizabeth's death and Anna's engagement catalysts to breaking up their sisterhood. After the family moved into Orchard House in July 1858, Alcott again returned to Boston to find employment. Unable to find work and filled with despair, Alcott contemplated suicide by drowning, but she decided to "take Fate by the throat and shake a living out of her." She eventually received an offer to work as a governess for invalid Alice Lovering, which she accepted.

== Later years ==
=== Civil War service ===
As an adult, Alcott was an abolitionist, temperance advocate, and feminist. When the American Civil War broke out in 1861, Alcott wanted to enlist in the Union Army but could not because she was a woman. Instead, she sewed uniforms and waited until she reached the minimum age for army nurses at thirty years old. Soon after turning thirty in 1862, Alcott applied to the U. S. Sanitary Commission, run by Dorothea Dix, and on December 11 was assigned to work in the Union Hotel Hospital in Georgetown, Washington, D. C. When she left, Bronson felt as if he was "sending [his] only son to the war". When she arrived, she discovered that conditions in the hospital were poor, with over-crowded and filthy quarters, bad food, unstable beds, and insufficient ventilation. Diseases such as scarlet fever, chicken pox, measles, and typhus were rampant among the patients. Alcott's duties included cleaning wounds, feeding the men, assisting with amputations, dressing wounds, and later assigning patients to their wards. She also entertained patients by reading aloud and putting on skits. She served as a nurse for six weeks in 1862–1863. She intended to serve three months, but contracted typhoid fever and became critically ill partway through her service. In late January, Bronson traveled to the hospital and took Alcott to Concord to recover.

=== Lulu Nieriker ===
Alcott nursed her mother Abigail, who was dying, in 1877 while writing Under the Lilacs (1878). Alcott also became ill and close to dying, so the family moved in with Anna Alcott Pratt, who had recently purchased Thoreau's house with Alcott's financial support. After Abigail's death in November, Alcott and Bronson permanently moved into Anna's house. Her sister May was living in London at the time and married Ernest Nieriker four months later. May became pregnant and was due to deliver her child near the end of 1879. Though Alcott wanted to travel to Paris to see May in time for the delivery, she decided against it because her health was poor. On December 29, May died from complications developed after childbirth. In September 1880, Alcott assumed the care of her niece, Lulu, who was named after her. Nieriker sent the news to Emerson and asked him to share it with Bronson and his daughters. Only Alcott was at home when Emerson arrived; she guessed the news before he told her and shared it with Bronson and Anna after he left. During the grief that followed May's death, Alcott and her father coped by writing poetry. In a letter to her friend Maria S. Porter, Alcott wrote, "Of all the griefs in my life, and I have had many, this is the bitterest." It was at this time that she completed Jack and Jill: A Village Story (1880).

Alcott sometimes hired a nanny when her poor health made it difficult to care for Lulu. While raising Lulu, she published few works. Among her published works at this time are the volumes of Lulu's Library (1886–1889), collections of stories written for her niece Lulu. When Bronson suffered a stroke in 1882, Alcott became his caretaker. In the years that followed, she alternated between living in Concord, Boston, and Nonquitt. In June 1884, Alcott sold Orchard House, in which the family was no longer living.

=== Decline and death ===
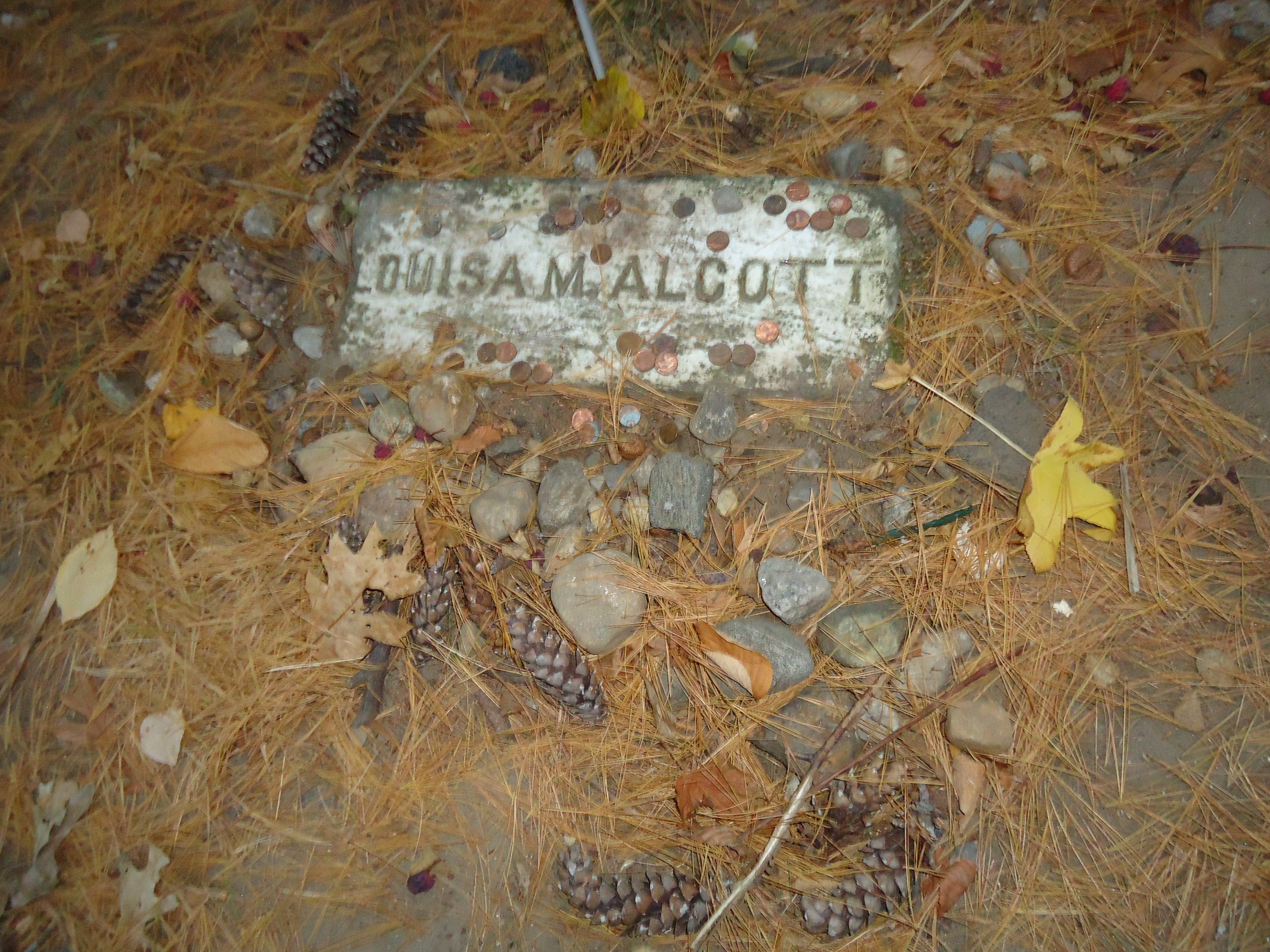
Louisa May Alcott's grave in Sleepy Hollow Cemetery, Concord, Massachusetts

Alcott suffered from chronic health problems in her later years, including vertigo, dyspepsia, headaches, fatigue, and pain in the limbs, diagnosed as neuralgia in her lifetime. When conventional medicines did not alleviate her pain, she tried mind-cure treatments, homeopathy, hypnotism, and Christian Science. Her ill health has been attributed to mercury poisoning, morphine intake, intestinal cancer, or meningitis. Alcott herself cited mercury poisoning as the cause of her sickness. When she contracted typhoid fever during her American Civil War service, she was treated with calomel, which is a compound containing mercury. Dr. Norbert Hirschhorn and Dr. Ian Greaves suggest that Alcott's chronic health problems may have been associated with an autoimmune disease such as systemic lupus erythematosus, possibly because mercury exposure compromised her immune system. An 1870 portrait of Alcott shows her cheeks to be flushed, perhaps with the butterfly rash that is often characteristic of lupus. The suggested diagnosis, based on Alcott's journal entries, cannot be proved.

As Alcott's health declined, she often lived at Dunreath Place, a convalescent home run by Dr. Rhoda Lawrence, for which she had provided financial support in the past. Eventually a doctor advised Alcott to stop writing to preserve her health. In 1887, she legally adopted Anna's son, John Pratt, and made him heir to her royalties, then created a will that left her money to her remaining family. Alcott visited Bronson at his deathbed on March 1, 1888, and expressed the wish that she could join him in death. On March 3, the day before her father died, she suffered a stroke and went unconscious, in which state she remained until her death on March 6, 1888. She was buried in Sleepy Hollow Cemetery in Concord, near Emerson, Hawthorne, and Thoreau, on a hillside now known as Authors' Ridge. Her niece Lulu was eight years old when Alcott died and was cared for by Anna Alcott Pratt for two years before reuniting with her father in Europe.

== Literary success ==
=== Works ===
In 1859 Alcott began writing for the Atlantic Monthly. Encouraged by Sanborn and Moncure Conway, Alcott revised and published the letters she wrote while serving as a nurse in the Boston anti-slavery paper Commonwealth, later collecting them as Hospital Sketches (1863, republished with additions in 1869). She planned to travel to South Carolina to teach freed slaves and write letters she could later publish, but she was too ill to travel and abandoned the plan. Soon after the success of Hospital Sketches, Alcott published her novel Moods (1864), based on her own experience with and stance on "woman's right to selfhood." Alcott struggled to find a publisher because the novel was long. After abridgments, Moods was published and popular. In 1882 Alcott changed the end. While touring Europe in 1870, she was displeased to find out that her publisher released a new edition without her approval.

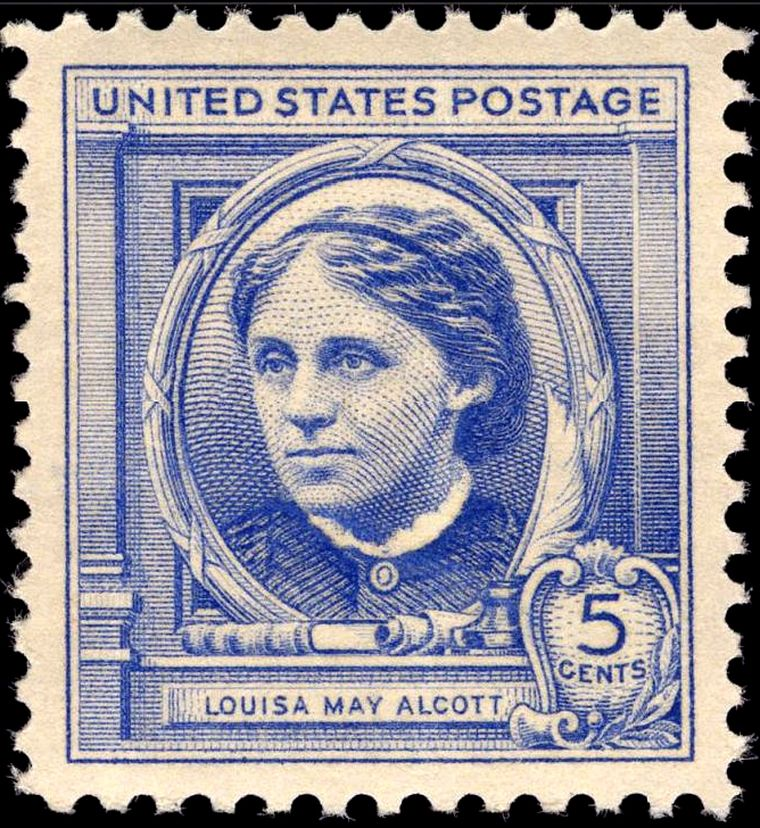
Louisa May Alcott U.S. commemorative stamp, 1940 issue

Alcott began editing the children's magazine Merry's Museum to help pay off family debts incurred while she toured Europe as the companion of wealthy invalid Anna Weld in 1865–66. Though Alcott disliked editing the magazine, she became its main editor in 1867. Around the same time, Alcott's publisher, Thomas Niles, asked her to write a book especially for girls. She was hesitant to write it because she felt she knew more about boys than she did about girls, but she eventually set to work on her semi-autobiographical novel Little Women: or Meg, Jo, Beth and Amy (1868). After publishing Little Women she, and her sister May, moved to Europe. Alcott developed a close relationship with the young Polish revolutionary Ladislas Wisniewski during her European tour with Weld. She met him in Vevey, where he taught her French and she taught him English. She detailed a romance between herself and Wisniewski but later took it out. Alcott identified Wisniewski as one of the models for the character Laurie in Little Women. Her other model for Laurie was fifteen-year-old Alfred Whitman, who she met shortly before the death of her sister Elizabeth and with whom she corresponded for several years afterward. She based the heroine Jo on herself, and other characters were based on people from Alcott's life. Later Niles asked Alcott to write a second part. Also known as Good Wives (1869), it follows the March sisters into adulthood and marriage.

In 1870 Alcott joined May and a friend on a European tour. Though numerous publishers requested new stories, Alcott wrote little while in Europe, instead preferring to rest. Meanwhile, rumors began to spread that she had died from diphtheria. She eventually described their travels in "Shawl Straps" (1872). While in Europe, Alcott began writing Little Men after finding out that her brother-in-law, John Pratt, had died. She was driven to write the book to provide financial support for her sister Anna and her two sons. Alcott felt that she "must be a father now" to her nephews. After she left Europe, the book was released the day she arrived in Boston. Alcott took seven years to complete Jo's Boys (1886), her sequel to Little Men. She began the book in 1879 but discontinued it after her sister May's death in December. Alcott resumed work on the novel in 1882 after Mary Mapes Dodge of St. Nicholas asked for a new serial. Jo's Boys (1886) completed the "March Family Saga", Alcott's best-known books. The general popularity of her first few published works surprised Alcott. Throughout her career as a writer, she shied away from public attention, sometimes acting as a servant when fans came to her house.

=== Critical reception ===
Before her death, Alcott asked her sister Anna Pratt to destroy her letters and journals; Anna destroyed some and gave the remaining ones to family friend Ednah Dow Cheney. In 1889 Cheney was the first person to undergo a deep study of Alcott's life, compiling the journals and letters to publish Louisa May Alcott: Her Life, Letters, and Journals. The compilation has been published multiple times since then. Cheney also published Louisa May Alcott: The Children's Friend, which focused on Alcott's appeal to children. Other various compilations of Alcott's letters were published in the following decades. In 1909 Belle Moses wrote Louisa May Alcott, Dreamer and Worker: A Study of Achievement, which established itself as the "first major biography" about Alcott. Katharine S. Anthony's Louisa May Alcott, written in 1938, was the first biography to focus on Alcott's psychology. A comprehensive biography about Alcott was not written until Madeleine B. Stern's 1950 Louisa May Alcott. In the 1960s and 1970s, feminist analysis of Alcott's fiction increased; analysis of her works also focused on the contrast between her domestic and sensation fiction.

Martha Saxton's 1978 Alcott May: A Modern Biography of Louisa May Alcott depicts Alcott's life in a manner that Karen Halttunen, a professor of History and American Studies at the University of Southern California, called "controversial". Alcott biographer Ruth K. MacDonald considered Saxton's biography to be excessively psychoanalytical, portraying Alcott as a victim to her family. MacDonald also praised Saxton's description of Alcott's acquaintance with several intellectuals of the time. MacDonald praised Sarah Elbert's 1984 biography A Hunger for Home: Louisa May Alcott and Little Women for its combination of Saxton's psychological perspective and Madelon Bedell's larger discussion of the Alcott family from The Alcotts: Biography of a Family. She also stated that the biography could use more analysis of Alcott's works. Kate Beaird Meyers of the University of Tulsa felt that the 1987 version, entitled A Hunger for Home: Louisa May Alcott's Place in American Culture, "is much more sophisticated" because Elbert drew upon other scholars and placed Alcott within American literature. Alcott scholar Daniel Shealy compiled and edited Alcott in Her Own Time. Roberta Trites called it "fascinating and thorough", though she said it needed more background information about the essayists, while fellow Alcott scholar Gregory Eiselein praised Shealy's use of original accounts. Trites called Harriet Reisen's biography Louisa May Alcott: The Woman Behind Little Women "far more balanced than some of her predecessors['] in that ... she follows John Matteson's lead in demonstrating how emotionally complex the relationship was between Alcott's parents and their daughters." She was referring to John Matteson's Eden's Outcasts: The Story of Louisa May Alcott and Her Father, which won the 2008 Pulitzer Prize for Biography or Autobiography. Taylor Barnes of The Christian Science Monitor generally praised Reisen's biography but wrote that its "microscopic examination" of Alcott's life becomes confusing. Cornelia Meigs's 1934 biography Invincible Alcott: The Story of the Author of Little Women won the Newbery Medal. Critical Insights: Louisa May Alcott, edited by Gregory Eiselein and Anne K. Phillips, contains a series of essays discussing Alcott's life and literature.

== Genres and style ==
=== Sensation and adult fiction ===
Alcott preferred writing sensation stories and novels more than domestic fiction, confiding in her journal, "I fancy 'lurid' things". They were influenced by the works of other writers such as Goethe, Charles Dickens, Charlotte Brontë, and Nathaniel Hawthorne. The stories follow themes of incest, murder, suicide, psychology, secret identities, and sensuality. Her characters are often involved in opium experimentation or mind control and sometimes experience insanity, with males and females contending for dominance. The female characters push back against the Cult of Domesticity and explore its counter ideals, Real Womanhood. Important to Alcott's income because they paid well, these sensation stories were published in The Flag of Our Union, Frank Leslie's Chimney Corner, and Frank Leslie's Illustrated Newspaper. Her thrillers were usually published anonymously or with the pseudonym A. M. Barnard. J. R. Elliott of The Flag repeatedly asked her to contribute pieces under her own name, but she continued using pseudonyms. Louisa May Alcott scholar Leona Rostenberg suggests that she published these stories under pseudonyms to preserve her reputation as an author of realistic and juvenile fiction. Researching for his dissertation in 2021, doctorate candidate Max Chapnick discovered a possible new pseudonym, E. H. Gould. Chapnick found a story referenced in Alcott's personal records in the Olive Branch, published under the name E. H. Gould. While Chapnick is uncertain if the pseudonym conclusively belongs to Alcott, other stories he found include references to people and places in her life.

American studies professor Catherine Ross Nickerson credits Alcott with creating one of the earliest works of detective fiction in American literature—preceded only by Edgar Allan Poe's "The Murders in the Rue Morgue" and his other Auguste Dupin stories—with her 1865 thriller "V.V., or Plots and Counterplots". The story, which she published anonymously, concerns a Scottish aristocrat who tries to prove that a mysterious woman has killed his fiancée and cousin. The detective on the case, Antoine Dupres, is a parody of Poe's Dupin who is less concerned with solving the crime than in setting up a way to reveal the solution with a dramatic flourish. Alcott's gothic thrillers remained undiscovered until the 1940s and were not published in collections until the 1970s.

Alcott's adult novels were not as popular as she wished them to be. They lack the optimism of her juvenile fiction and explore difficult marriages, women's rights, and conflict between men and women.

=== Juvenile and domestic fiction ===
Alcott had little interest in writing for children, but saw it as a good financial opportunity. She felt that writing children's literature was tedious. Alcott biographer Ruth K. MacDonald suggests that Alcott's hesitance to write children's novels may have arisen from the societal perception that writing for children was a means by which poor women made money. Her juvenile fiction portrays both women who fit Victorian ideals of domesticity and women who have careers and decide to remain single. In her domestic stories she focuses on women and children as characters, and some of the adult characters discuss social reform, such as women's rights. The child protagonists are often flawed, and the stories include didactics. Though her juvenile fiction is largely based on her childhood, she does not focus on the poverty her family experienced.

=== Style ===
Alcott's writing has been described as "episodic" because the narratives are broken into distinctive events with little connective tissue. Her early work is modeled after Charlotte Brontë's work. The style and ideas that appear in her writing are also influenced by her transcendental upbringing, both promoting and satirizing transcendentalist ideals. As a realist writer, she explores social conflict; she also promotes advanced views on education. She incorporates slang into her characters' dialogue, which contemporaries criticized her for doing. She also uses intertextuality by frequently including references to plays and well-known statues, among other things.

== Social involvement ==
=== Abolition ===
When Alcott was young, her family served as station masters on the Underground Railroad and housed fugitive slaves. Alcott was unable to dictate when she first became an abolitionist, suggesting that she became an abolitionist either when William Lloyd Garrison was attacked for his abolitionist efforts or when a young African-American boy saved her from drowning in Frog Pond. Both events occurred when Alcott was a child. Alcott formed her abolitionist ideas, in part, from listening to conversations between her father and uncle Samuel May or between her father and Emerson. She was also inspired by the abolitionism of Rev. Theodore Parker, Charles Sumner, Wendell Phillips, and William Lloyd Garrison, with whom she was acquainted. She also knew Frederick Douglass in adulthood. As a young woman Alcott joined her family in teaching African-Americans how to read and write. When John Brown was executed on December 2, 1859, for his involvement in anti-slavery, Alcott described it as "the execution of Saint John the Just". Alcott attended several abolitionist rallies, including a rally at Tremont Temple that advocated for Thomas Simm's freedom. She also believed in the full integration of African-Americans into society. She wrote multiple anti-slavery stories such as "M. L.", "My Contraband", and "An Hour". According to Sarah Elbert, Alcott's anti-slavery stories show her regard for Harriet Beecher Stowe's anti-slavery works.

=== Women's rights ===
After her mother's death, Alcott committed to following her example by actively advocating for women's suffrage. In 1877, Alcott helped found the Women's Educational and Industrial Union in Boston. She read and admired the Declaration of Sentiments published by the Seneca Falls Convention on women's rights, and became the first woman to register to vote in Concord, Massachusetts in a school board election on March 9, 1879. She encouraged other Concord women to vote and was disappointed when few did. Alcott became a member of the National Congress of the Women of the United States while attending the Woman's Congress in 1875 and later recounted it in "My Girls". She gave speeches advocating women's rights and eventually convinced her publisher Thomas Niles to publish suffragist writings. She advocated for dress and diet reform as well as for women to receive college education, sometimes signing her letters with "Yours for reform of all kinds". Alcott also signed the "Appeal to Republican Women in Massachusetts", a petition that attempted to secure the vote for women.

Along with Elizabeth Stoddard, Rebecca Harding Davis, Anne Moncure Crane, and others, Alcott was part of a group of female authors during the Gilded Age who addressed women's issues in a modern and candid manner. Their works were, as one newspaper columnist of the period commented, "among the decided 'signs of the times'". Alcott also joined Sorosis, where members discussed health and dress reform for women, and she helped found Concord's first temperance society. Between 1874 and 1887 many of her works, published in the Woman's Journal, discussed women's suffrage. Her essay "Happy Women" in The New York Ledger argued that women did not need to marry. She explained her spinsterhood in an interview with Louise Chandler Moulton, saying, "I am more than half-persuaded that I am a man's soul put by some freak of nature into a woman's body.... because I have fallen in love with so many pretty girls and never once the least bit with any man." After her death, Alcott was memorialized during a suffragist meeting in Cincinnati, Ohio.

== Legacy ==
=== Alcott homes ===
The Alcotts' Concord home, Orchard House, where the family lived for 25 years and where Little Women was written, is open to the public and pays homage to the Alcotts by focusing on public education and historic preservation. The Louisa May Alcott Memorial Association, which was founded in 1911 and runs the museum, allows tourists to walk through the house and learn about Louisa May Alcott. The Alcotts' earlier home in Concord, Hillside, is open as part of the Minute Man National Historic Park. Her Boston home is featured on the Boston Women's Heritage Trail. Fruitlands, where Alcott and her family lived when she was a child, is a museum in Harvard, Massachusetts, which also includes a Shaker building, a Gallery, and a Native American museum on the site.

=== Film and television ===
Little Women inspired film versions in 1933, 1949, 1994, 2018, and 2019. The novel also inspired television series in 1958, 1970, 1978, and 2017, anime versions in 1981 and 1987, and a 2005 musical. It also inspired a BBC Radio 4 version in 2017. Little Men inspired film versions in 1934, 1940, and 1998, and was the basis for a 1998 television series. Other films based on Louisa May Alcott novels and stories are An Old-Fashioned Girl (1949), The Inheritance (1997), and An Old Fashioned Thanksgiving (2008). "Louisa May Alcott: The Woman Behind 'Little Women'" aired in 2009 as part of the American Masters biography series and was aired a second time on May 20, 2018. It was directed by Nancy Porter and written by Harriet Reisen, who wrote the script based on primary sources from Alcott's life. The documentary, which starred Elizabeth Marvel as Alcott, was shot onsite for the events it covered. It included interviews with Louisa May Alcott scholars, including Sarah Elbert, Daniel Shealy, Madeleine Stern, Leona Rostenberg, and Geraldine Brooks.

=== Popular culture ===
Alcott appears as the protagonist in the Louisa May Alcott Mystery series, written by Jeanne Mackin under the pseudonym Anna Maclean. In book one, Alcott and the Missing Heiress, Alcott is living in Boston in 1854 and writing her sensation stories. She finds the dead body of a fictional friend who recently returned from a honeymoon and solves the mystery. Alcott and the Country Bachelor follows Alcott as she visits cousins in Walpole, New Hampshire, in the summer of 1855 and discovers the dead body of an immigrant bachelor. Alcott decides to solve what she suspects is a murder. In Alcott and the Crystal Gazer, the third and final book in the series, she solves the murder of a divination woman in Boston in 1855.

The Lost Summer of Louisa May Alcott by Kelly O'Connor McNees takes place in Walpole in 1855 and follows Alcott as she finds romance. Alcott falls in love with a fictional character named Joseph Singer but chooses to pursue a profession as a writer instead of continuing her relationship with Singer. In Only Gossip Prospers by Lorraine Tosiello, Alcott visits New York City shortly after publishing Little Women. During her trip, Alcott seeks to remain anonymous because of an unrevealed circumstance from her past. The Revelation of Louisa May Alcott by Michaela MacColl takes place in 1846; young Alcott solves the murder of a slave catcher. Patricia O'Brien's The Glory Cloak tells of a fictional friendship between Alcott and Clara Barton, Alcott's work in the Civil War, and her relationships with Thoreau and her father. The epistolary novel The Bee and the Fly: The Improbable Correspondence of Louisa May Alcott and Emily Dickinson, by Lorraine Tosiello and Jane Cavolina, follows a fictional correspondence between Alcott and Dickinson, which Dickinson initiates in 1861 by asking Alcott for literary advice.

=== Influence ===
Various modern writers have been influenced and inspired by Alcott's work, particularly Little Women. As a child, Simone de Beauvoir felt a connection to Jo and expressed, "Reading this novel gave me an exalted sense of myself. Cynthia Ozick calls herself a "Jo-of-the-future", and Patti Smith explains, "[I]t was Louisa May Alcott who provided me with a positive view of my female destiny." Writers influenced by Louisa May Alcott include Ursula K. Le Guin, Barbara Kingsolver, Gail Mazur, Anna Quindlen, bell hooks, Anne Lamott, Sonia Sanchez, Ann Petry, Gertrude Stein, and J. K. Rowling. U. S. president Theodore Roosevelt said he "worshiped" Louisa May Alcott's books. Other politicians who have been impacted by her books include Ruth Bader Ginsberg, Hillary Clinton, and Sandra Day O'Connor. Alcott was inducted into the National Women's Hall of Fame in 1996. In July, 1967 a street in Co-op City, Bronx was named in honor of Alcott (Alcott Place).

== Works ==
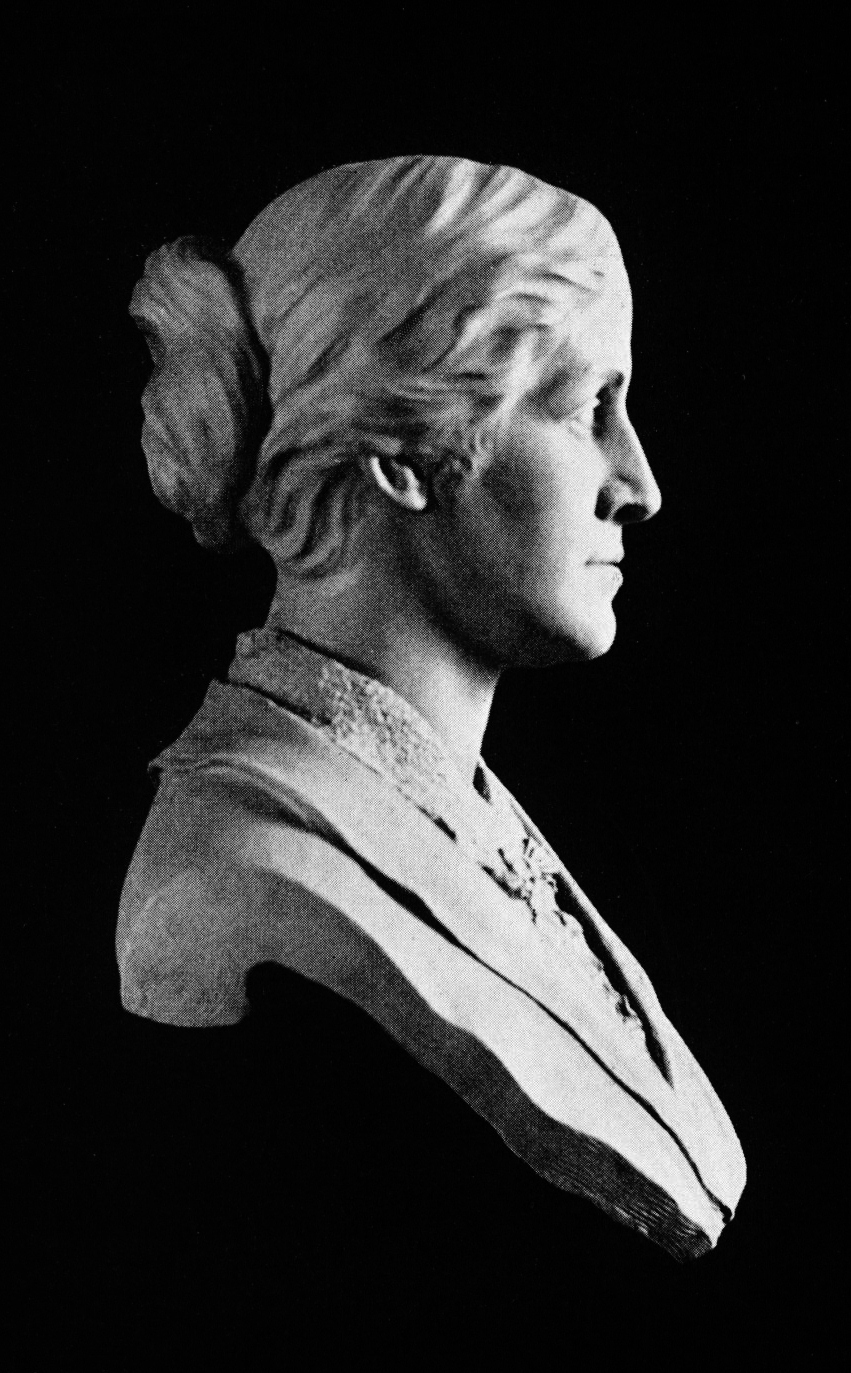
Bust of Louisa May Alcott

=== The Little Women Tetralogy ===
1. Little Women, or Meg, Jo, Beth and Amy (1868)
2. Good Wives (1869)
3. Little Men: Life at Plumfield with Jo's Boys (1871)
4. Jo's Boys and How They Turned Out: A Sequel to "Little Men" (1886)

=== Novels ===
- The Inheritance (1849, unpublished until 1997)
- Moods (1865, revised 1882)
- An Old Fashioned Girl (1869)
- Will's Wonder Book (1870)
- Work: A Story of Experience (1873)
- Beginning Again, Being a Continuation of Work (1875)
- Eight Cousins, or The Aunt Hill (1875)
- Rose in Bloom: A Sequel to Eight Cousins (1876)
- Under the Lilacs (1878)
- Jack and Jill: A Village Story (1880)

==== As A. M. Barnard ====
- A Marble Woman; or, The Mysterious Model (1865)
- Behind a Mask, or a Woman's Power (1866)Gaul, T. S. (2003). Trance-Formations: Mesmerism and A Woman’s Power” in Louisa May Alcott’s Behind a Mask. Women’s Studies, 32(7), 835. https://doi.org/10.1080/00497870390236831a
- The Abbot's Ghost, or Maurice Treherne's Temptation (1867)
- A Long Fatal Love Chase (1866; first published 1995)

==== Published anonymously ====
- A Pair of Eyes, or Modern Magic (1863)
- A Modern Mephistopheles (1877)

=== Novellas ===
- Hospital Sketches (1863)
- Pauline's Passion and Punishment (1863)
- My Contraband, first published as The Brothers (1863)
- A Whisper in the Dark (1863)
- The Freak of a Genius (1866)
- The Mysterious Key and What It Opened (1867)
- La Jeune; or, Actress and Woman (1868)
- Countess Varazoff (1868)
- The Romance of a Bouquet (1868)
- A Laugh and A Look (1868)
- Transcendental Wild Oats (1873)
- Silver Pitchers, and Independence: A Centennial Love Story (1876)
- The Fate of the Forrests
- A Double Tragedy: An Actor's Story
- Ariel, A Legend of the Lighthouse
- A Nurse's Story
- May Flowers

==== As A. M. Barnard ====
- V.V.: or, Plots and Counterplots (1865)

=== Short story collections ===
- Flower Fables (1854)
- On Picket Duty, and other tales (1864)
- Morning-Glories and Other Stories (1867)
- Kitty's Class Day and Other Stories (Three Proverb Stories) (1868)
- Aunt Jo's Scrap-Bag (1872–1882). (66 short stories in six volumes)
  - 1. "Aunt Jo's Scrap-Bag"
  - 2. "Shawl-Straps"
  - 3. "Cupid and Chow-Chow"
  - 4. "My Girls, Etc."
  - 5. "Jimmy's Cruise in the Pinafore, Etc."
  - 6. "An Old-Fashioned Thanksgiving, Etc."
- Proverb Stories (1882)
- Spinning-Wheel Stories (1884)
- Lulu's Library (1886–1889) (three volumes)
- A Garland for Girls (1887)

=== Short stories ===
- "The Rival Painters: A Tale of Rome" (1852)
- "Love and Self-Love" (1860)
- "Enigmas" (1864)
- "The Skeleton in the Closet" (1867)
- "My Mysterious Mademoiselle" (1869)
- "Lost in a Pyramid; or, The Mummy's Curse" (1869)
- "Perilous Play" (1876)
- "The Candy Country" (1885)
- "Which Wins?"
- "Honor's Fortune"
- "Mrs. Vane's Charade"

==== Published anonymously ====
- "Doctor Dorn's Revenge" (1868)
- "Fatal Follies" (1868)
- "Taming a Tartar"
- "Fate in a Fan"

=== Poems ===
- "Sunlight" (1851)
- "My Kingdom" (written 1845, published 1875)
- "The Children's Song" (written 1860, published 1889)
- "Young America" (1861)
- "With A Rose That Bloomed on the Day of John Brown's Martyrdom" (1862)
- "Thoreau's Flute" (1863)
- "In the Garret" (1865)
- "The Sanitary Fair" (1865)
- "Come, Butter, Come" (1867)
- "What Shall the Little Children Bring" (1884)
- "Oh, the Beautiful Old Story" (1886)
- "The Fairy Spring" (1887)

=== Posthumous ===
- "Recollections of My Childhood" (1888)
- Comic Tragedies (1893)
- Morning-Glories and Queen Aster (1904)
- Diana and Persis (1978, incomplete manuscript)
- The Brownie and the Princess (2004)

== Works cited ==
=== Books ===
- Alcott, Louisa May (1988). Showalter, Elaine (ed.). Alternative Alcott. Rutgers University Press. ISBN 978-0813512723. "Alternative Alcott"
- Alcott, Louisa May (November 2, 2015). The Annotated Little Women. Manhattan, NY: W. W. Norton & Company. ISBN 978-0393072198.
- Anderson, William (1995). The World of Louisa May Alcott : A first-time glimpse into the life and times of Louisa May Alcott, author of "Little Women". Internet Archive. New York: HarperPerennial. ISBN 978-0-06-095156-6.
- Cheever, Susan (2011) [2010]. Louisa May Alcott: A Personal Biography (1st ed.). Simon and Schuster. ISBN 978-1416569923.
- Cheever, Susan (November 2010). Louisa May Alcott. Simon & Schuster. ISBN 978-1-4165-6991-6.
- Cheney, Ednah D., ed. (2015) [1889]. Louisa May Alcott, Life, Letters, and Journals. Boston: CreateSpace. ISBN 978-1518656934. Archived from the original on May 2, 2023.
- Cullen-DuPont, Kathryn (2000). Encyclopedia of Women's History in America. Infobase Publishing. pp. 8–9. ISBN 978-0-8160-4100-8. Archived from the original on January 13, 2023.
- Delamar, Gloria T. (1990). Louisa May Alcott and "Little Women": Biography, Critique, Publications, Poems, Songs and Contemporary Relevance. McFarland & Company. ISBN 0-89950-421-3. Wikidata Q126509746.
- Doyle, Christine (2000). Louisa May Alcott and Charlotte Bronte: Transatlantic Translations. Univ. of Tennessee Press. ISBN 1572332417.
- Doyle, Christine (2001). "Louisa May Alcott (29 November 1832–6 March 1888)". In Hudock, Amy E.; Rodier, Katharine (eds.). Dictionary of Literary Biography: American Women Prose Writers, 1820–1870. Vol. 239. USA: The Gale Group. ISBN 978-0787646561.
- Durst Johnson, Claudia (1999). "Discord in Concord: National Politics and Literary Neighbors". In Idol, Jr, John L.; Ponder, Melinda M. (eds.). Hawthorne and Women. University of Massachusetts Press. ISBN 1-55849-174-0.
- Eiselein, Gregory (2016). "Louisa May Alcott, Patti Smith, and Punk Aesethetics". In Eiselein, Gregory; Phillips, Anne K. (eds.). Critical Insights: Louisa May Alcott. Ipswich, MA: Salem Press. pp. 221–236. ISBN 978-1-61925-521-0.
- Eiselein, Gregory; Phillips, Anne K. (2016). "On Louisa May Alcott: Questions on Her Significance, Singularity, Sorority, and Staying Power". In Eiselein, Gregory; Phillips, Anne K. (eds.). Critical Insights: Louisa May Alcott. Ipswich, MA, USA: Salem Press. pp. 3–17. ISBN 978-1-61925-521-0.
- Elbert, Sarah (1987) [1984]. A Hunger for Home: Louisa May Alcott's Place in American Culture. Rutgers University Press. ISBN 0-8135-1199-2.
- Golden, Catherine J. (December 30, 2003). "Louisa May Alcott (1832-1888)". In Knight, Denise (ed.). Writers of the American Renaissance: An A-to-Z Guide. Bloomsbury Publishing. ISBN 978-0-313-01707-0.
- Hischak, Thomas S. (January 10, 2014). American Literature on Stage and Screen: 525 Works and Their Adaptations. McFarland. ISBN 978-0-7864-9279-4.
- Isenberg, Nancy; Burstein, Andrew, eds. (2003). Mortal Remains: Death in Early America. University of Pennsylvania Press. ISBN 978-0812218237.
- Keyser, Elizabeth Lennox (1993). Whispers in the Dark: The Fiction of Louisa May Alcott. Internet Archive. Knoxville : University of Tennessee Press. ISBN 978-0-87049-809-1.
- Lyon Clark, Beverly (2004). Louisa May Alcott: The Contemporary Reviews. Cambridge University Press. ISBN 978-0521827805.
- MacDonald, Ruth K. (1983). Louisa May Alcott. Boston: Twayne Publishers. ISBN 0-8057-7397-5.
- Matteson, John (2007). Eden's Outcasts: The Story of Louisa May Alcott and Her Father. Norton. ISBN 978-0-393-05964-9.
- Matteson, John (2016). "'When Rude Hands Shake the Hive': Louisa May Alcott and the Transformation of America". In Eiselein, Gregory; Phillips, Anne K. (eds.). Critical Insights: Louisa May Alcott. Ipswich, MA: Salem Press. pp. 27–38. ISBN 978-1-61925-521-0.
- McFall, Gardner (2018), "Ambitious Daughter: Louisa May Alcott and Her Mother", in Salwak, Dale (ed.), Writers and Their Mothers, Cham: Springer International Publishing, pp. 21–30, doi:10.1007/978-3-319-68348-5_3, ISBN 978-3-319-68348-5.
- Meigs, Cornelia (1968). Invincible Louisa: The Story of the Author of Little Women. Little, Brown and Company. ISBN 978-0316565943.
- Moses, Belle (1909). Louisa May Alcott, Dreamer and Worker: A Story of Achievement. D. Appleton and Company.
- Moulton, Louise Chandler (1884). "Louisa May Alcott". Our Famous Women: An Authorized Record of the Lives and Deeds of Distinguished American Women of Our Times. A. D. Worthington & Company. p. 49.
- Norwich, John Julius (1990). Oxford Illustrated Encyclopedia Of The Arts. USA: Oxford University Press. ISBN 978-0-19-869137-2.
- Parr, James L. (2009). Dedham: Historic and Heroic Tales From Shiretown. The History Press. ISBN 978-1-59629-750-0.
- Porter, Maria S. (2005). "Recollections of Louisa May Alcott (1892)". In Shealy, Daniel (ed.). Alcott in Her Own Time. Iowa City, IA: University of Iowa Press. pp. 58–73. ISBN 0-87745-937-1.
- Reisen, Harriet (2009). Louisa May Alcott: The Woman Behind Little Women. Henry Holt and Company. ISBN 978-0-8050-8299-9.
  - Reisen, Harriet (2010). Louisa May Alcott: The Woman Behind Little Women (Unabridged ed.). Macmillan + ORM. ISBN 978-1-4299-2881-6.
- Richardson, Charles F. (1911). "Alcott, Louisa May" . In Chisholm, Hugh (ed.). Encyclopædia Britannica. Vol. 1 (11th ed.). Cambridge University Press. p. 529.
- Richardson, Robert D. (1995). Emerson: The Mind on Fire: A Biography. Berkeley: University of California. pp. 245–251. ISBN 0-520-20689-4.
- Ross Nickerson, Catherine (2010). "4: Women Writers Before 1960". In Catherine Ross Nickerson (ed.). The Cambridge Companion to American Crime Fiction. Cambridge University Press. p. 31. ISBN 978-0-521-13606-8.
- Rosetenberg, Leona (1998). "Some Anonymous and Pseudonymous Thrillers of Louisa M. Alcott". In Stern, Madeleine B. (ed.). Louisa May Alcott: From Blood & Thunder to Hearth & Home. Northeastern University Press. pp. 73–82. ISBN 1-55553-349-3.
- Sander, Kathleen Waters (1998). The Business of Charity: The Woman's Exchange Movement, 1832–1900. University of Illinois Press. p. 66. ISBN 0252067037.
- Saxton, Martha (1995). Louisa May Alcott: A Modern Biography. USA: Farrar, Straus and Giroux. ISBN 0374524602.
- Shealy, Daniel, ed. (2005). Alcott in Her Own Time: A Biographical Chronicle of Her Life, Drawn from Recollections, Interviews, and Memoirs by Family, Friends and Associates. Iowa City, Iowa: University of Iowa Press. ISBN 0-87745-938-X.
- Stern, Madeleine B.; Shealy, Daniel, eds. (1993). "Introduction". The Lost Stories of Louisa May Alcott. New York: Citadel Press. ISBN 0-8065-1654-2.
- Stern, Madeleine B., ed. (1998). Louisa May Alcott: From Blood & Thunder to Hearth & Home. Northeastern University Press. ISBN 1-55553-349-3.
- Stern, Madeleine B. (1999). Louisa May Alcott. Boston: Northeastern University Press. pp. 168–182. ISBN 978-1555534172.
- Stern, Madeleine B. (2000). "Louisa May Alcott (29 November 1832-6 March 1888)". In Mott, Wesley T. (ed.). Dictionary of Literary Biography: The American Renaissance in New England. Vol. 223. USA: The Gale Group. ISBN 0-7876-3132-9.
- Thomas, Amy M. (2016). "Looking for Louisa: authors, Audiences, and Literatures in Alcott's Critical Reception". In Eiselein, Gregory; Phillips, Anne K. (eds.). Critical Insights: Louisa May Alcott. Ipswich, MA, USA: Salem Press. pp. 39–51. ISBN 978-1-61925-521-0.

=== Journals ===
- Franklin, Rosemary F. (1999). ""Louisa May Alcott's Father(s) and 'The Marble Woman'"". ATQ (The American Transcendental Quarterly). 13 (4). ProQuest 222374039.
- Halttunen, Karen (1984). "The Domestic Drama of Louisa May Alcott". Feminist Studies. 10 (2): 233–254. doi:10.2307/3177865. ISSN 0046-3663. JSTOR 3177865.
- Hirschhorn, Norbert; Greaves, Ian (2007). "Louisa May Alcott: Her Mysterious Illness". Perspectives in Biology and Medicine. 50 (2): 243–259. doi:10.1353/pbm.2007.0019. PMID 17468541. S2CID 26383085.
- MacDonald, Ruth K. (1978). "Review of Louisa May: A Modern Biography of Louisa May Alcott". The New England Quarterly. 51 (3): 450–452. doi:10.2307/364624. ISSN 0028-4866. JSTOR 364624.
- MacDonald, Ruth (1984). "A Hunger for Home: Louisa May Alcott and Little Women (review)". Children's Literature Association Quarterly. 9 (4): 207. doi:10.1353/chq.0.0670. ISSN 1553-1201.
- Meyers, Kate Beaird (1988). "Review of Alternative Alcott; A Hunger for Home: Louisa May Alcott's Place in America Culture. Rev. ed". Legacy. 5 (2): 68–70. ISSN 0748-4321. JSTOR 25679037.
- Ronsheim, Robert D. (February 29, 1968). "The Wayside: Minuteman National Historical Park. Historic Structure Report, Part II, Historical Data Section" (PDF). Minuteman National Historical Park. Historic Structure Report.
- "Review 2 – No Title". The Radical. May 1868.
- Sands-O'Connor, Karen (March 1, 2001). "Why Jo Didn't Marry Laurie: Louisa May Alcott and The Heir of Redclyffe". American Transcendental Quarterly. 15 (1): 23. ProQuest 222376461.
- Shealy, Daniel (1992). "Louisa May Alcott's Juvenilia: Blueprints for the Future". Children's Literature Association Quarterly. 17 (4). Johns Hopkins University Press: 15–18. doi:10.1353/chq.0.1028 – via Project MUSE.
- Sneller, Judy E. (2013). "Lurid Louisa or Angelic Alcott?: Humor, Irony, and Identity in Louisa May Alcott's Stories of the 1860s". The International Journal of Literary Humanities. 10 (3). Common Ground Research Networks: 41–50. doi:10.18848/2327-7912/CGP/v10i03/43874.
- Stern, Madeleine B. (1978). "Louisa Alcott's Feminist Letters". Studies in the American Renaissance: 429–452. JSTOR 30227455.
- Trites, Roberta Seelinger (2005). "Alcott in Her Own Time (review)". Children's Literature Association Quarterly. 30 (3). Johns Hopkins University Press: 341–344. doi:10.1353/chq.2006.0001. ISSN 1553-1201.
- Trites, Roberta Seelinger (2010). "Louisa May Alcott: The Woman Behind Little Women (review)". Children's Literature Association Quarterly. 35 (2): 217–219. doi:10.1353/chq.2010.a381192. ISSN 1553-1201.

=== Websites ===
- "Alcott in Her Own Time | University of Iowa Press". uipress.uiowa.edu. March 1, 2011.
- "Alcott: 'Not The Little Woman You Thought She Was'". NPR. December 29, 2009. Archived from the original on March 22, 2018.
- "Amos Bronson Alcott". National Park Service.
- "An Old-Fashioned Girl". Turner Classic Movies. Archived from the original on March 7, 2017.
- Atlas, Nava (September 2, 2017). "10 Writers Who Were Inspired by Jo March of Little Women". Literary Ladies Guide.
- Barnes, Taylor (December 28, 2009). "Louisa May Alcott: The Woman Behind Little Women". Christian Science Monitor. ISSN 0882-7729.
- Brooks, Rebecca Beatrice (September 19, 2011). "Louisa May Alcott: The First Woman Registered to Vote in Concord". History of Massachusetts. Archived from the original on February 3, 2018.
- Chapnick, Max; The Conversation US. "How I Discovered a Likely Pen Name of Louisa May Alcott". Scientific American.
- "A Conversation with Harriet Reisen | Louisa May Alcott". louisamayalcott.net.
- Creamer, Ella (November 7, 2023). "Researcher uncovers a new body of work believed to be by Louisa May Alcott". The Guardian. ISSN 0261-3077.
- Freeman, Jean R. (April 23, 2015). "Louisa May Alcott, a spinster hero for single women of all eras". The Washington Post. Archived from the original on November 8, 2020.
- Higginbotham, Susan. "The Bee & The Fly: The Improbable Correspondence of Louisa May Alcott & Emily Dickinson". Historical Novel Society.
- Hill, Rosemary (February 29, 2008). "From little acorns, nuts: Review of 'Eden's Outcasts: The Story of Louisa May Alcott and Her Father' by John Matteson". The Guardian. Archived from the original on December 1, 2016.
- "Humanity, Said Edgar Allan Poe, Is Divided Into Men, Women, And Margaret Fuller". American Heritage. Archived from the original on December 28, 2022.
- Kritenbrink, Angie (April 27, 2004). "Book Review: Patricia O'Brien's The Glory Cloak". www.identitytheory.com.
- Lerner, Maura (August 12, 2007). "A diagnosis, 119 years after death". Star Tribune. Archived from the original on May 17, 2008.
- "Little Women". BBC.
- "The Lost Summer of Louisa May Alcott". Kirkus Reviews.
- "The Lost Summer of Louisa May Alcott by Kelly O'Connor McNees: 9780425240830 | PenguinRandomHouse.com: Books". PenguinRandomhouse.com.
- "Louisa May Alcott". Boston Women's Heritage Trail. Archived from the original on November 24, 2020.
- "Louisa May Alcott". Britannica. May 2024.
- "Louisa May Alcott and Charlotte Bronte | University of Tennessee Press".
- "Louisa and the Country Bachelor by Anna Maclean: 9780451234711 | PenguinRandomHouse.com: Books". PenguinRandomhouse.com.
- "Louisa and the Crystal Gazer by Anna Maclean: 9781101576144 | PenguinRandomHouse.com: Books". PenguinRandomhouse.com.
- "Louisa M. Alcott Dead". The New York Times. March 7, 1888. Archived from the original on January 6, 2018.
- "Louisa and the Missing Heiress by Anna Maclean: 9780451233240 | PenguinRandomHouse.com: Books". PenguinRandomhouse.com.
- "Louisa and the Missing Heiress: A Louisa May Alcott Mystery by Anna MacLean". www.publishersweekly.com.
- "Louisa May Alcott Mystery". PenguinRandomhouse.com.
- "Louisa May Alcott's Orchard House". Louisa May Alcott's Orchard House.
- "Louisa May Alcott, Virginia Woolf, and 'a room of one's own' | Palgrave Macmillan". www.palgrave.com.
- "Louisa May Alcott: The Woman Behind Little Women, The Alcotts". Nancy Porter Productions, Inc. 2015. Archived from the original on February 3, 2015.
- Martin, Lauren (November 29, 2016). "Louisa May Alcott's Quotes That Lived 184 Years". Words of Women. Archived from the original on June 3, 2019.
- McMichael, Barbara Lloyd (June 18, 2011). "Louisa May Alcott as protagonist: Three new novels feature the author of 'Little Women'". The Seattle Times.
- Mello-Klein, Cody (November 8, 2023). "Discovery of Louisa May Alcott work found under new pseudonym, researcher says". Northeastern Global News.
- "National Women's Hall of Fame, Louisa May Alcott". Archived from the original on November 20, 2018.
- R., Cindy (May 14, 2018). "Louisa May Alcott: The Woman Behind 'Little Women' ~ About the Film". American Masters – PBS.
- "The Revelation of Louisa May Alcott". Kirkus Reviews.
- "The Revelation of Louisa May by Michaela MacColl". www.publishersweekly.com.
- "Salem Press – Critical Insights: Louisa May Alcott". salempress.com.
- Salmon, Patrika. "Louisa and the Crystal Gazer". Historical Novel Society.
- Scheib, Ronnie (November 3, 2008). "An Old-Fashioned Thanksgiving". Variety.
- Scott, Tony (April 4, 1997). "Louisa May Alcott's the Inheritance". Variety.
- Shoop, Michael I. "Louisa and the Country Bachelor". Historical Novel Society.
- Showalter, Elaine (March 1, 2004). "Moor, Please: New books on the Bronte phenomenon". Slate. Archived from the original on February 7, 2020.
- "The Story of the Author of Little Women: Invincible Louisa". www.ala.org.
- Toohey, Jodie. "Only Gossip Prospers: A Novel of Louisa May Alcott in New York". Historical Novel Society.
