= Behind a Mask =

1866 novel by Louisa May Alcott

Behind a Mask, or A Woman's Power
- Author: Louisa May Alcott (writing as A. M. Barnard)
- Genre: Novel
- Publication date: 1866
- Publication place: United States
- OCLC: 81598607

Behind a Mask, or A Woman's Power is a novel written by American author Louisa May Alcott. The novel was originally published in 1866 under the pseudonym of A. M. Barnard in The Flag of Our Union. Set in Victorian era Britain, the story follows Jean Muir, the deceitful governess of the wealthy Coventry family. With expert manipulation, Jean Muir obtains the love, respect, and eventually the fortune of the Coventry family.

Since it was republished by Madeleine B. Stern in 1975, the novel has become important in critical reinterpretation of Alcott's corpus of works and literary importance. Many literary critics treat the novel; for example, one critic treated the novel as a version of the "Beauty and the Beast" trope, while others provide feminist critiques of the narrative. Alcott's treatment of themes like acting, social class, and the struggle for agency all inform these larger discussions by critics.

== Background ==
Behind a Mask was originally published in The Flag of Our Union in 1866. Later, in 1975, Madeleine B. Stern republished the story under Alcott's name with a collection of her other pieces. The republication of the work engendered new interest among literary critics; according to Christine Doyle Francis, it "stimulated the reconsideration of [Alcott's] career" in the period since.

This story belongs with many other thrillers and mysteries that Alcott published under the pseudonym A. M. Barnard. Of all her stories of femme fatales, Behind a Mask is considered Alcott's masterpiece in the genre of sensation fiction. Critic Christine Doyle Francis describes the novel as "ow[ing] most to Alcott's reading of Charlotte Bronte's Jane Eyre and William Thackery's Vanity Fair. In this light, Jean Muir becomes a subversion of the classic governess character in protest to the British class system and in praise of America as a "land of opportunity".

== Plot ==
Set in the Coventry Mansion during the Victorian era, the wealthy family hires a young woman named Jean Muir to be the governess of sixteen-year-old Bella. When she first meets the Coventry family, Jean succeeds in charming Bella, Ned and Mrs. Coventry by having a fainting spell. However, Gerald and Lucia, son of the estate and cousin to the Coventry family, remain suspicious. They are skeptical with good reason, for when Jean retires to her own bedroom, she removes her costume (a wig and some fake teeth) to reveal that she is actually an actress of at least thirty years of age.

Acting the part of a harmless governess, Jean slowly but surely weasels her way into the hearts of the Coventry family. Eventually, all the male characters fall in love with her: first Ned, the youngest, followed by the skeptic Gerald, and gradually the unassuming uncle, John. She uses the love they bestow upon her to turn them against each other and eventually to secure the Coventry estate for herself. By the end of the story, Jean Muir has married John to become Lady Coventry.

== Character - Character ==
- Jean Muir: an actress at least thirty years of age who disguises herself as a young, demure governess. Doyle describes the activeness and determination of Jean as following similar character archetypes as Alcott's other work, such as Jo in Little Women and Christie Devon from Work: A Story of Experience.
- Gerald Coventry: the idle, condescending oldest son of the Coventry family
- Edward Coventry (Ned): the younger, more naive son of the Coventry family
- Bella Coventry: the affectionate daughter of the Coventry family
- Lucia Beaufort: a snide young woman, cousin to Gerald, Edward, and Bella
- John Coventry: the elderly uncle of Gerald, Edward, and Bella
- Mrs. Coventry: the mother of Gerald, Edward and Bella

== Themes ==
One of the dominant themes in the novella is the positive treatment of actresses, acting, and theatre, much more positive than contemporary works. Doyle describes such positive treatments of acting as "highlighting Alcott's longtime interest in the theatre. She acted in community groups wrote plays for such groups and attended[...] many performances in Boston". Doyle describes this treatment similar to the treatment of acting in the short stories "V.V.: or Plots and Counterplots" (1865) and "A Double Tragedy: An Actor's Story" (1865), and the novels Work: A Story of Experience (1873) and Jo's Boys (1886). The most apparent permeation of theatre in Behind a Mask is the scene with the tableaux, in which Jean and Gerald hold lurid poses to entertain their audience.

Another theme present in the novella is that of social class. In her article titled "Domestic Conspiracy: Class Conflict and Performance in Louisa May Alcott's 'Behind a Mask,'" Elizabeth Schewe discusses the significance of the main character being a governess, a character who embodies class conflict in nineteenth-century literature. She points out that the governess (a lower-class individual) is teaching Bella, the young lady of the house (an upper-class individual.) In itself, this is a subversion of the social hierarchy.

The attainment of agency also claims thematic precedence in Behind a Mask. Sara Hackenberg suggests that Jean Muir actually adopts the authorship of her own life by assuming many roles: the governess, the teacher, the mesmerizer, the master plotter, and, finally, the surrogate fiction author. Using fiction (or deception) to manipulate "characters" (the Coventry family), Jean creates her own story in which she is both the antagonist and the protagonist.

== Critical reception ==
Many literary critics have taken interest in the novella because its material was controversial for its time. One such literary critic is Christine Butterworth-McDermott, who sees this story as a transfiguring of the classic "Beauty and the Beast" story. She argues that Behind a Mask actually combines the characters, making Jean Muir both the "Beauty" and the "Beast". According to Butterworth-McDermott, the story is a criticism on the common literary trope of a woman spending her life healing a “Beast.” According to her argument, Alcott defies this literary trope by creating a character that is both beauty and beastly: Jean plays the role of a "Beauty" in order to hide her true nature as a "Beast".

The novel frequently receives feminist readings from literary critics. For example, Judith Fetterley, a well-known scholar on the works of Louisa May Alcott, argues that Alcott's motivation for writing the book was because she was stifled by the constraints society set on women during the nineteenth century. Fetterley sees a direct, perhaps even semi-autobiographical connection between Jean Muir and Alcott. According to her reading, Alcott wrote this story to subvert the fantasy of the perfect, "little woman". Cheri Louise Ross provides another feminist reading in her scholarly article in which she points out that Alcott created dangerous, independent, and intelligent female characters to subvert the patriarchal society in which they live.

== Adaptations ==
In Feb. 1983 a dramatic adaptation of Behind a Mask by Karen L. Lewis, directed by Amie Brockway, premiered Off-Broadway at Theater of the Open Eye in NYC. NY Magazine 2/14/1983. In 2000, the story was adapted as a musical, titled The Night Governess with book, music and lyrics by Polly Pen. It premiered at Princeton's McCarter Theatre.
