= Roberts Brothers =

American bookbinder and publisher

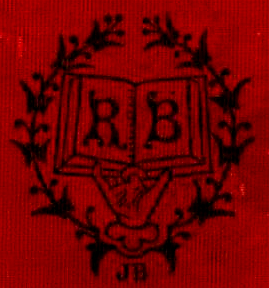
- Emblem of Roberts Bros., publishers, 1869
- Founded: 1857
- Founder: Austin J. Roberts, John F. Roberts, and Lewis A. Roberts
- Successor: Little, Brown and Company
- Country of origin: United States
- Headquarters location: Boston, Massachusetts
- Publication types: Books

Messrs. Roberts Brothers (1857–1898) were bookbinders and publishers in 19th-century Boston, Massachusetts. Established in 1857 by Austin J. Roberts, John F. Roberts, and Lewis A. Roberts, the firm began publishing around the early 1860s. American authors included: Louisa May Alcott, Susan Coolidge, Emily Dickinson, Maud Howe Elliott, Louise Imogen Guiney, Julia Ward Howe, Helen Hunt Jackson, Abigail May Alcott Nieriker. British and European authors included: Berthold Auerbach, Caroline Bauer, Mathilde Blind, Juliana Horatia Ewing, Anne Gilchrist, David Gray, Philip Gilbert Hamerton, Jean Ingelow, Vernon Lee, William Morris, Silvio Pellico, Adelaide Ristori, A. Mary F. Robinson, George Sand, Charlotte Mary Yonge, Helen Zimmern.

== History ==
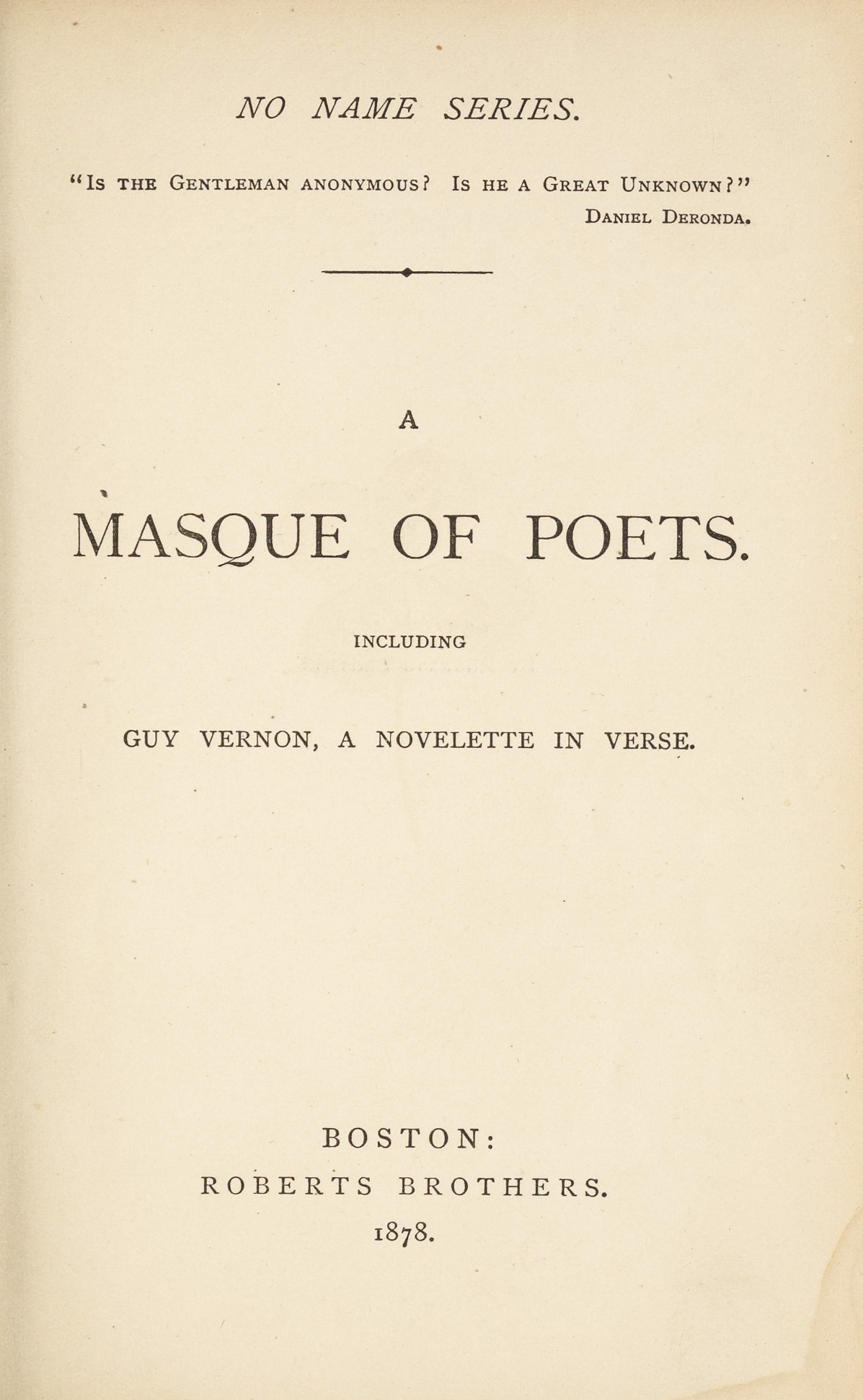
A Masque of Poets, 1878

The Roberts Brothers were "bookbinders" from 1857 until 1862 (offices successively at: 120 Washington St.; Temple Place; 149 Washington St.) Beginning in 1862 they were also makers of "photograph albums." In 1863 Thomas Niles Jr. began working at the firm. He became partner some years thereafter and remained with the Roberts Brothers until his death in 1894. By 1873 the firm was listed under the names of just Lewis Roberts and Thomas Niles. After several decades on Washington Street across from Old South Meeting House, the business moved to Somerset Street in the 1880s.

As publishers, the Roberts Brothers made their name in 1868 with the publication of Louisa May Alcott's Little Women, a best-seller. It featured illustrations by Alcott's sister, May Alcott, who also appeared as a character (Amy) in the book.

From 1876–1887, the firm issued a "No Name Series" of books that did not reveal the writers' names in an attempt to allow the writing to stand on its own merits rather than the reputation of the authors. The books were the brainchild of Thomas Niles Jr., a partner at Roberts Brothers. Harper's praised the move, writing "The idea is a good one, not only because it will pique the curiosity of the reader, but also because it will put the writers on their mettle to do their best, and absolutely prevent that trading on reputation which is the greatest vice of American litterateurs."

The Famous Women Series of the 1880s and 1890s consisted of biographies of Margaret Fuller, Jane Austen, Mary Wollstonecraft, George Eliot, and others, most of them written by women. As a contemporary review put it, "subjects and authors are in the main English, but several famous American women have had their trials and triumphs recorded by other famous American women."

Little, Brown bought the firm in 1898.
