= Chiefly About War Matters =

1862 essay by American author Nathaniel Hawthorne

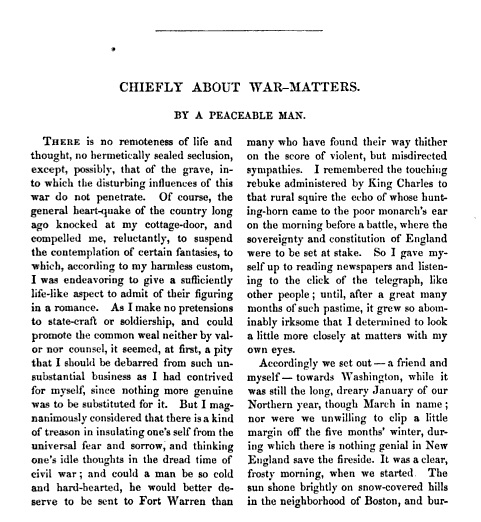
The first page of "Chiefly About War Matters" as it appeared in The Atlantic Monthly, July 1862

"Chiefly About War Matters", originally credited "by a Peaceable Man", is an 1862 essay by American author Nathaniel Hawthorne. The essay was inspired by the author's traveling during the American Civil War to experience more of the conflict firsthand. Upon its publication, it was controversial for its somewhat pro-southern stance and antiwar sentiments. Hawthorne was also chastised for his unflattering descriptions of American president Abraham Lincoln.

== Background ==
At the outbreak of the American Civil War, Hawthorne wanted to view the effects of battle firsthand or, as he wrote, "to look a little more closely at matters with my own eyes". He was distracted by the national crisis and had difficulty writing. After consulting with friends Franklin Pierce and Horatio Bridge, he decided to visit Washington, D.C. and was commissioned by The Atlantic Monthly to write a report on the Civil War, which appeared in the July 1862 issue of the magazine. His wife, Sophia Hawthorne, asked publisher William D. Ticknor to accompany her husband. The two set out in March 1862, leaving by train from Massachusetts through New York and on to Philadelphia, then Washington.

While traveling, Hawthorne witnessed heavy military presence, including guards at railroad depots and scattered military encampments. As he wrote to his wife, "The farther we go, the deeper grows the rumble and grumble of the coming storm, and I think the two armies are only waiting our arrival to begin." During his visit, Hawthorne met Major General George B. McClellan at his headquarters. Shortly after, he met President Abraham Lincoln at the White House on March 13. The meeting also included secretary of war Edwin M. Stanton and secretary of the treasury Salmon P. Chase. Hawthorne had joined a group from Massachusetts who were presenting the president with an ivory-handled whip. Lincoln kept them waiting for about half an hour while he ate breakfast. Hawthorne stayed in Washington for about a month and took several side trips, including one visit to Harpers Ferry.

== Publication history ==
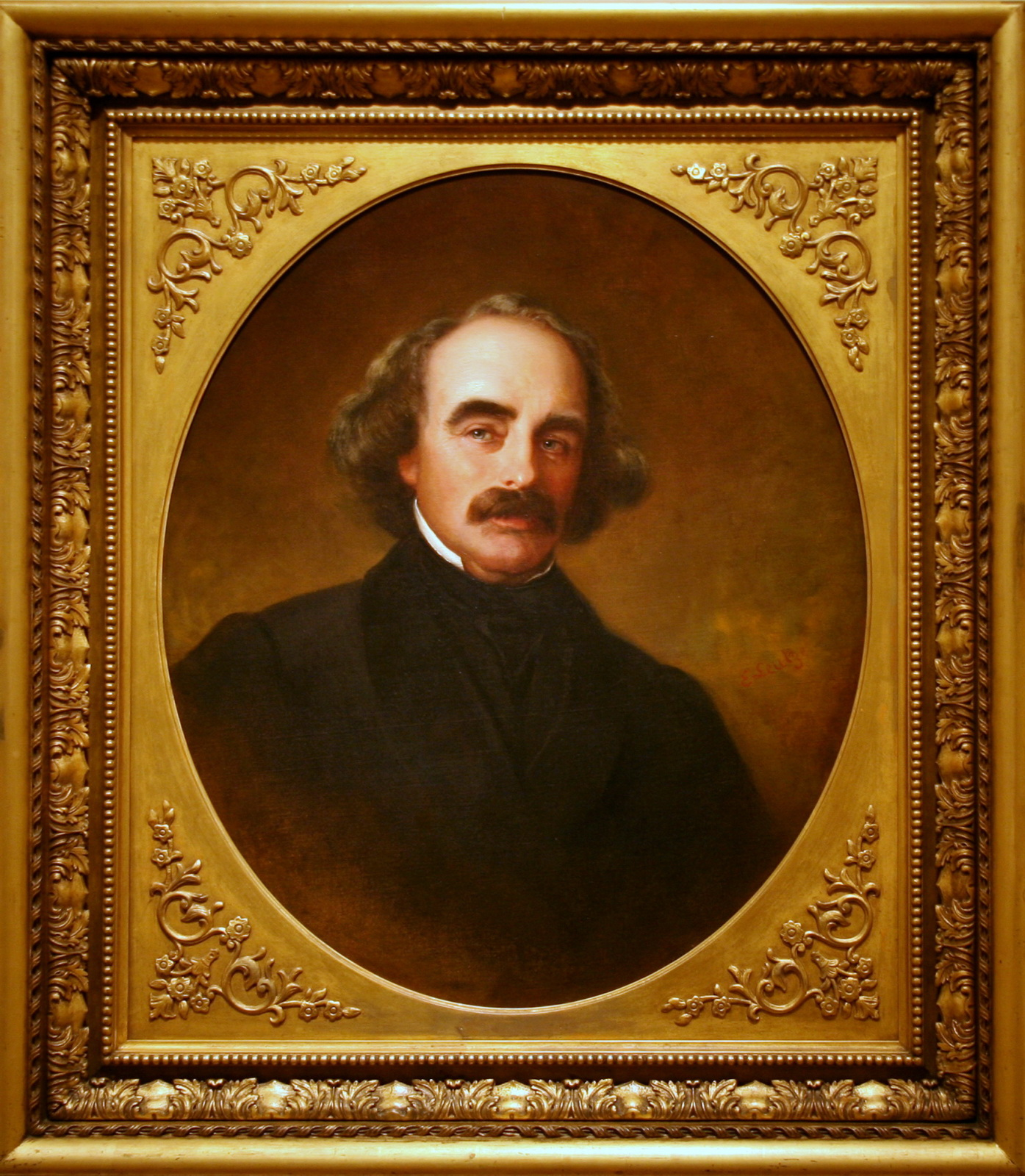
Hawthorne in 1862, the year he wrote "Chiefly About War Matters", by Emanuel Leutze

Hawthorne wrote "Chiefly About War Matters" in less than a month and sent the manuscript to publisher James T. Fields in May. Fields approved it without reading it, to the disappointment of Hawthorne, who wrote to Ticknor, "I wanted to benefit of somebody's opinion besides my own, as to the expediency of publishing two or three passages in the article." Fields soon regretted the decision as well and asked for changes. He tactfully wrote to Hawthorne, "I knew I should like it hugely and I do. But I am going to ask you to change some of it if you will." In particular, Fields asked to soften the description of Lincoln, whom Hawthorne referred to as "Uncle Abe", as homely, coarse, and unkempt:

The whole physiognomy is as coarse a one as you would meet anywhere in the length and breadth of the States; but, withal, it is redeemed, illuminated, softened, and brightened by a kindly though serious look out of his eyes, and an expression of homely sagacity, that seems weighted with rich results of village experience. A great deal of native sense; no bookish cultivation, no refinement; honest at heart, and thoroughly so, and yet, in some sort, sly,—at least endowed with a sort of tact and wisdom that are akin to craft, and would impel him, I think, to take an antagonist in flank, rather than to make a bull-run at him right in front. But, on the whole, I like this sallow, queer, sagacious visage, with the homely human sympathies that warmed it; and, for my small share in the matter, would as lief have Uncle Abe for a ruler as any man whom it would have been practicable to put in his place.

Though Hawthorne acquiesced to the editorial cuts, he lamented, "What a terrible thing it is to try to let off a little bit of truth into this miserable humbug of a world!" He believed the section was "the only part of the article really worth publishing." In its place, Hawthorne included a footnote which said, in part, "we are compelled to omit two or three pages, in which the author describes the interview, and gives his idea of the personal appearance and deportment of the President."

"Chiefly About War Matters" was published in the July 1862 issue of The Atlantic Monthly, then edited by Fields. Hawthorne used his "Peaceable Man" persona to respond to the contrived editor's notes in a letter to the editor published in the October 1862 issue of The Atlantic Monthly:

You can hardly have expected to hear from me again, (unless by invitation to the field of honor,) after those cruel and terrible notes upon my harmless article in the July Number... Not that I should care a fig for any amount of vituperation, if you had only let my article come before the public as I wrote it, instead of suppressing precisely the passages with which I had taken most pains, and which I flattered myself were most cleverly done.

The removed excerpt was reinserted in 1883 when the essay was republished in the collected works of Hawthorne edited by George Parsons Lathrop, who later married Rose Hawthorne, the author's daughter. In 1899, Horace Scudder asked Fields's widow, Annie Adams Fields, for permission to restore the omitted passages in a new publication of Hawthorne's works. Though these passages had already been printed in full, Scudder emphasized the previously "injudicious" material would be "harmless and quite interesting in 1900".

== Critical response ==
Many readers of The Atlantic were offended by Hawthorne's essay, and the magazine received "cruel and terrible notes". The concern was partially because it was somewhat pro-southern, but also because it was antiwar. It portrays Confederate prisoners of war in a sympathetic light, and people fleeing slavery in an unsympathetic one.

Others found it too ambiguous. George William Curtis condemned it as "without emotion, without sympathy, without principle". Hawthorne's biographer Edwin Haviland Miller wrote, "his familiar ambivalence afforded him a kind of cowardly protection and freedom from commitment, his see-sawing and evasiveness pleasing no one."

Hawthorne also offended many New Englanders by criticizing Ralph Waldo Emerson. Referring to John Brown as a "blood-stained fanatic", Hawthorne dismissed Emerson's assessment that his execution has "made the Gallows as venerable as the Cross!" Instead, Hawthorne concluded that "nobody was ever more justly hanged."

== Analysis ==
Scholars struggle over how to interpret "Chiefly About War Matters". It has been described as ironic black comedy or satire. In the latter reading, the Peaceable Man and the footnotes added by his fictitious editor both lampoon the state of the country, not only the slave-holding South but also the censorious North.
