= The Wayside =

Historic house in Concord, Massachusetts, US

Coordinates: 42°27′32″N 71°19′59″W

- U.S. National Register of Historic Places
- U.S. National Historic Landmark
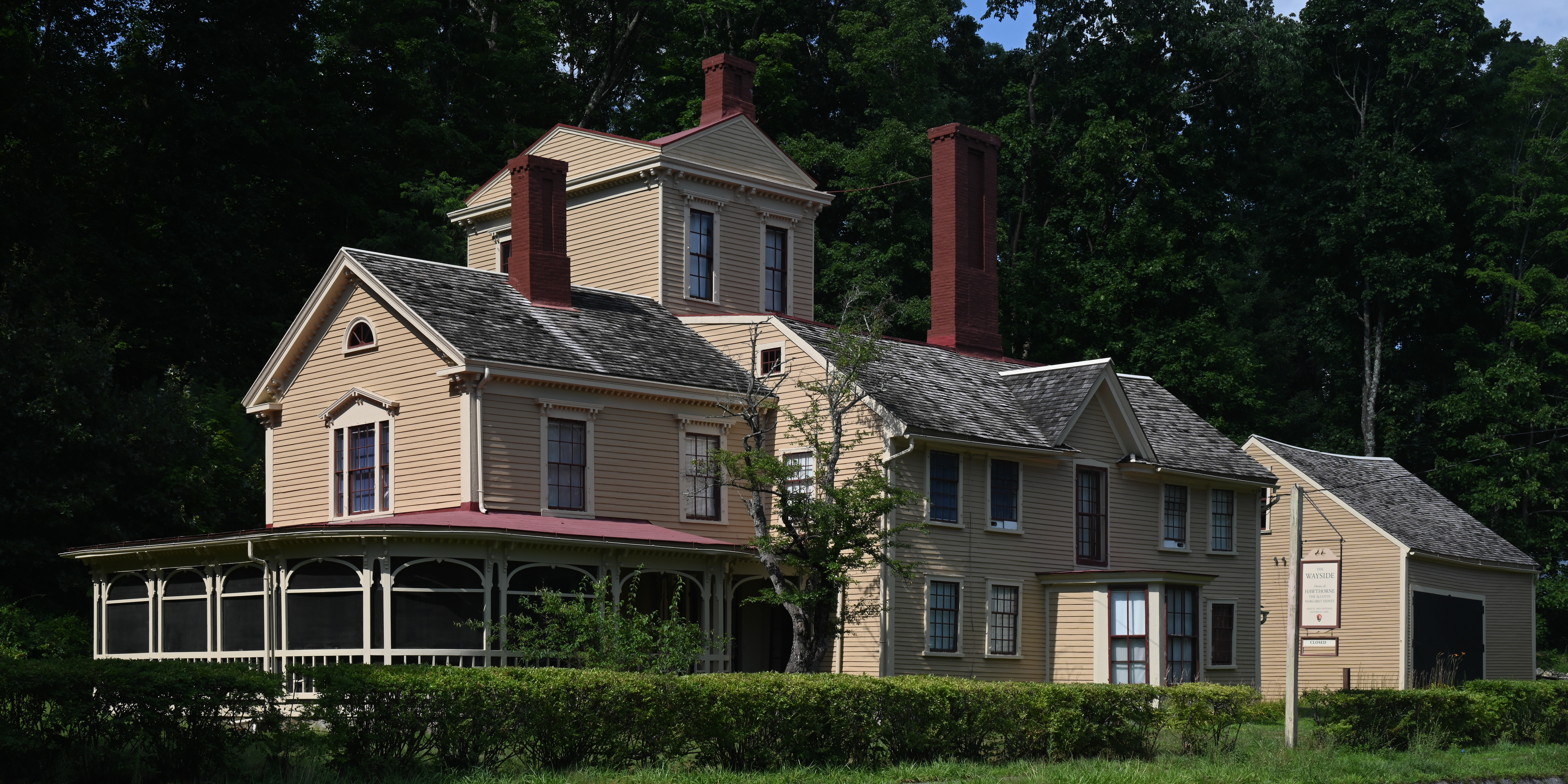
- The Wayside, home in turn to authors Louisa May Alcott, Nathaniel Hawthorne, and Margaret Sidney

- Location within Massachusetts Location within the United States
- Location: 455 Lexington Road; Concord, Massachusetts
- Architectural style: Colonial
- NRHP reference No.: 80000356

Significant dates
- Added to NRHP: July 11, 1980
- Designated NHL: December 29, 1962

The Wayside is a historic house in Concord, Massachusetts. The earliest part of the home may date to 1717. Later it successively became the home of the young Louisa May Alcott and her family, who named it Hillside, author Nathaniel Hawthorne and his family, and children's writer Margaret Sidney. It became the first site with literary associations acquired by the National Park Service and is now open to the public as part of Minute Man National Historical Park.

== Early history ==
The first record of the Wayside property occurs in 1717. Minuteman Samuel Whitney was living in this house, which still retained most of its original appearance, on April 19, 1775, when British troops passed by on their way to the Battles of Lexington and Concord at Concord's Old North Bridge. During the years 1775 and 1776 the house was occupied by scientist John Winthrop during the nine months when Harvard College was moved to Concord.

== The Alcotts ==
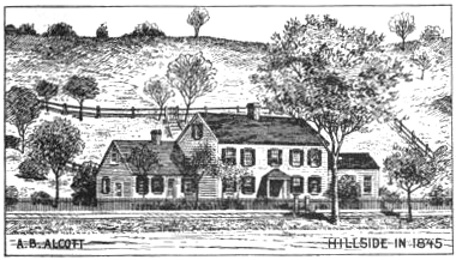
The Hillside in 1845

Shortly after the failure of the Fruitlands experiment, educator and philosopher Amos Bronson Alcott and his family moved to Concord. Beginning in October 1844, the family first lived in the home of a friend named Edmund Hosmer. Alcott's wife Abby May had recently inherited about $2,000 and they intended to use the money to buy a home. Neighbor Ralph Waldo Emerson helped the family find the property to buy: a home most recently owned by a wheelwright named Horatio Cogswell. Emerson also loaned the family $500 for their purchase. Bronson took no part in the transaction being, as his wife explained, "dissatisfied with the whole property arrangement" and did not believe he could own any part of the Earth. No one seemed to know much about the history of the home, though Henry David Thoreau told the story that one of its previous owners believed he would never die and his ghost was rumored to haunt it. The Alcotts moved in on April 1, 1845; they named the home "Hillside".

The Alcotts immediately began renovating what was originally a colonial saltbox home. A shed on the property was cut in half and attached to either side of the main house. Outside the house, they added terraces, arbors, and pavilions. Bronson had hoped his brother Junius and his family would move in with them and built additional rooms for that purpose. Instead, by that summer, Junius had a nervous breakdown and Bronson left to care for him.

In March 1846, the family added a bedroom for their 13-year-old daughter Louisa May Alcott. It was the first room she had to herself. She wrote in her journal, "It does me very good to be alone, and Mother has made it very pretty and neat for me." In this home, Louisa and her sisters lived many of the scenes that later appeared in her book Little Women (1868–69), including the amateur plays they performed. She also began writing what would become her first book, Flower Fables (1854).

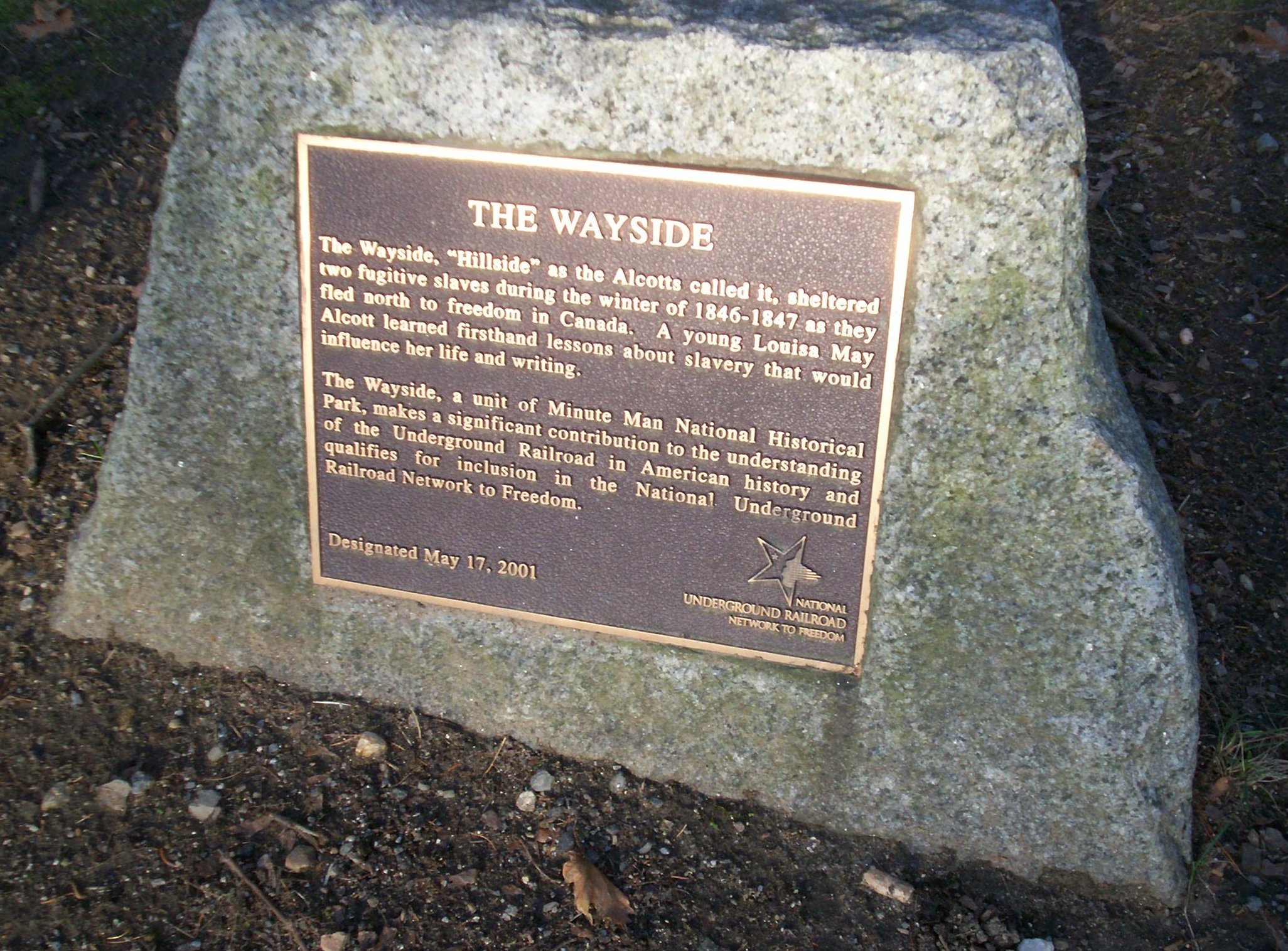
A plaque recognizes the role the Alcott family played as part of the Underground Railroad while living in this house.

Bronson opened the home to many people, including Sophia Foord, a teacher with whom he hoped to open a school. He also offered the home as a site for the Underground Railroad. The family likely hosted several escaped slaves; Louisa May, years later, referred to more than one, writing, "fugitive slaves were sheltered under our roof". Due to the requisite secrecy, however, few records of specific fugitives survive. Bronson referred to a 30-year-old man who was "athletic, dextrous, sagacious, and self-relying" who stayed there for a week in 1847 on his way to Canada. Bronson hoped the experience would serve as a lesson to his family.

By 1848, the family debated about moving. Bronson liked Concord because of the neighbors he could converse with. Abby, however, saw the town as a symbol of their poverty and desired a move to the city of Boston to be closer to friends, relatives, and potential work. She won the debate and the family rented out the Hillside and moved to the South End by that winter.

== The Hawthornes ==
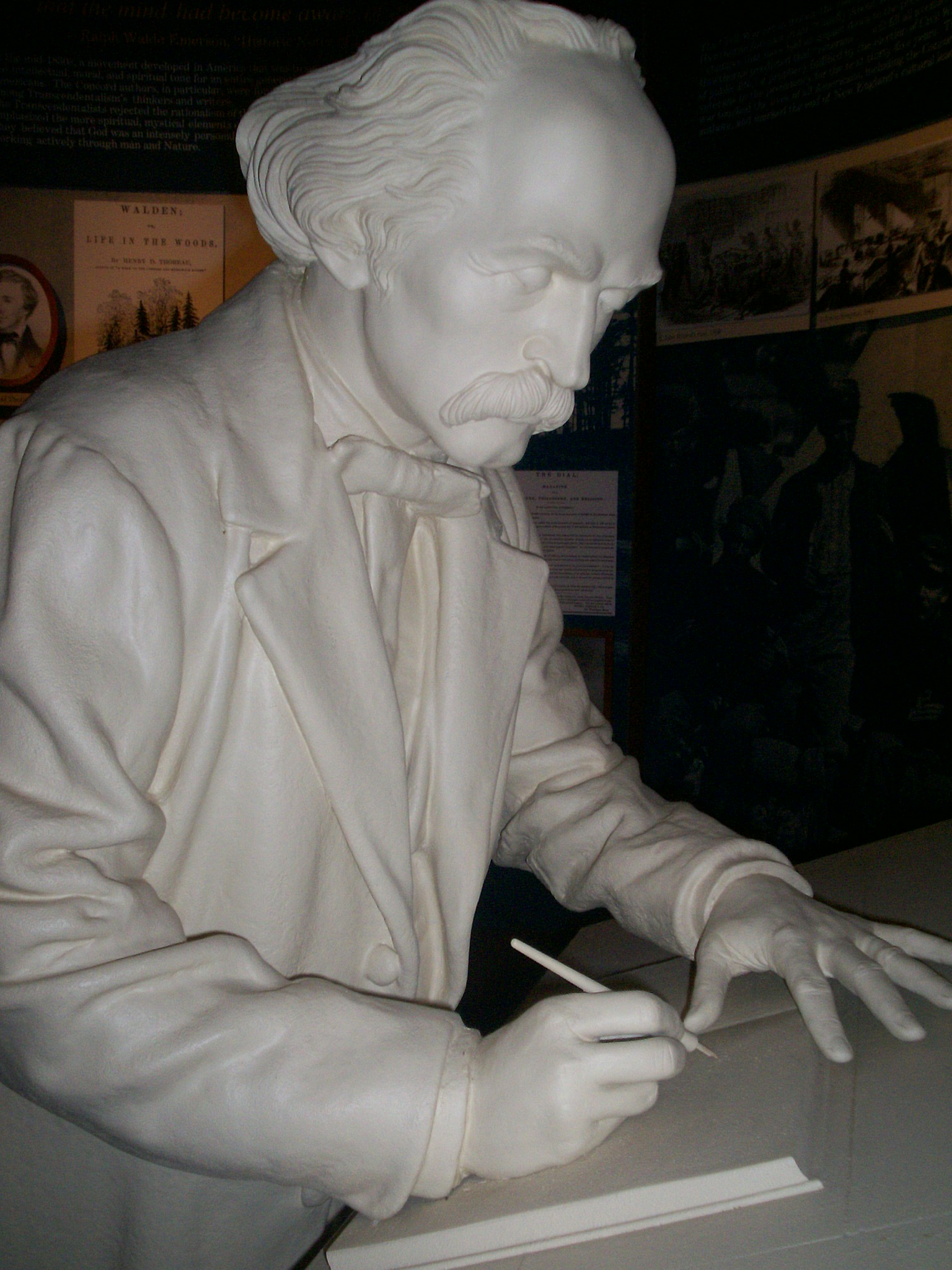
This statue of Nathaniel Hawthorne once stood in the visitor center of The Wayside but has since been moved to his writing tower.

After living for a time in a rented home in Lenox, Massachusetts, author Nathaniel Hawthorne considered purchasing a home for his family. He assured his wife Sophia Peabody that his publishers Ticknor & Fields "promise the most liberal advances of money, should we need it, towards buying the house." On March 8, 1852, Hawthorne finalized his purchase of the house for $1,500 from the Alcotts. After buying the house, Hawthorne wrote, "Mr Alcott... had wasted a good deal of money in fitting it up to suit his own taste—all of which improvements I get for little or nothing. Having been much neglected, the place is the raggedest in the world but it will make, sooner or later, a comfortable and sufficiently pleasant home." The Hawthornes had previously lived in Concord at The Old Manse, which they moved to after their July 9, 1842, wedding. Their new home was about two miles from there and the couple moved in with their three children in June. Nathaniel renamed it "The Wayside", noting that it stood so close to the road that it could have been mistaken for a coach stop. He explained in a letter: "I think [it] a better name, and more morally suggestive than that which... Mr. Alcott... bestowed on it." Bronson never accepted the name change and continued referring to it as "Hillside". Some time in 1852, the Hawthornes hired Henry David Thoreau to survey the property. The young six-year old Julian Hawthorne, the second of the Hawthornes' three children, accompanied him in silence. Thoreau remarked to the boys father he was a "good boy! Sharp eyes, and no tongue". By October 1852, Hawthorne wrote to his friend Henry Wadsworth Longfellow, "I am beginning to take root here, and feel myself, for the first time in my life, really at home."

=== European trips ===
The family moved to England when Nathaniel Hawthorne was appointed United States consul at Liverpool; he served in that role from August 1, 1853, to October 12, 1857. Shortly before leaving, on June 14, 1853, friend and poet Henry Wadsworth Longfellow held a farewell dinner party at his Cambridge home. The Hawthornes stayed in Europe until 1860 and, during that time, they leased The Wayside to family members including Sophia's sister, Mary Peabody, who later married Horace Mann. During her time in the house, Franklin Benjamin Sanborn stayed at The Wayside for a night while hiding his connection to John Brown's raid on Harpers Ferry. The Hawthornes' son Julian later went to Sanborn's school. Before returning to the United States, the Hawthornes spent several months in Italy where, in April 1859, Nathaniel grew a mustache.

While the Hawthornes were overseas, the Alcotts had Henry David Thoreau survey the land next door to The Wayside. The site was the former home of a man named John Moore and was surrounded by elms and butternut trees, and included an apple orchard. They purchased the home, which they named Orchard House, for $945 (~$32,653 in 2025) on September 22, 1857. The Hawthornes referred to it as "Apple Slump". While the Orchard House was being renovated, the Alcott family rented a wing of The Wayside. Unlike Bronson Alcott, Nathaniel was not known for socializing with his neighbors. He often used the hilltop in his backyard as a means of escaping social interactions. As Bronson noted, "he feared his neighbor's eyes would catch him as he walked." The children of the respective families, however, became quite friendly. Bronson was disappointed in his inability to connect with Nathaniel and noted, "Nobody gets a chance to speak with him unless by accident." Louisa was surprised the neighboring families did not become better friends. She wrote, "We did all we could to heal the breach between the families but they held off, so we let things rest."

=== Return to the United States ===
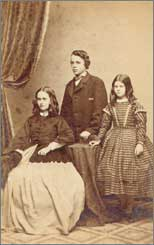
Una, Julian and Rose Hawthorne, circa 1862

After the family returned to the United States in 1860, Nathaniel considered moving to Boston, noting, "I am really at a loss to imagine how we are to squeeze ourselves into that little old cottage of mine." The income from his consulship did not bring as much money as he predicted and, to make matters worse, reception to his latest book, The Marble Faun, was not positive. Hoping to expand The Wayside rather than move, he wrote of his financial woes "with a wing of a house to build, and my girls to educate, and Julian to send to Cambridge [to study at Harvard College]". Nevertheless, the family made several changes to the home, most notably the three-story tower on the back of the house. The top room became Nathaniel's study—he named it his "sky parlor"—though the tin roof made the room very hot in summer and very cold in winter. During those months he used the front parlor for his writing. Julian Hawthorne moved his bedroom to the first floor sitting room. Next-door neighbor Bronson Alcott cut paths and planted gardens for the Hawthornes, which included fir trees and larches imported from England, and Thoreau surveyed the property for $10. The Hawthornes also added a second story over Alcott's west wing, enclosed the bay porch and moved the barn to the east side of the house. Nathaniel was not entirely pleased with the result:

I have been equally unsuccessful in my architectural projects; and have transformed a simple and small old farm-house into the absurdest anomaly you ever saw; but I really was not so much to blame here as the village-carpenter, who took the matter into his own hands, and produced an unimaginable sort of thing instead of what I asked for. (January 1864)

During these years, Nathaniel spurned invitations from James Russell Lowell to write for The Atlantic Monthly. When the journal was purchased by the publisher James T. Fields, he invited both Nathaniel and Sophia to write. He agreed but she declined, writing: "You forget that Mr. Hawthorne is the Belleslettres portion of my being, and besides that I have a repugnance to female authoresses in general. I have far more distaste for myself as a female authoress in particular."

=== Civil War years and beyond ===
At the outset of the American Civil War, Nathaniel Hawthorne's spirits and health were fading. Urged by his friend Horatio Bridge, he took a trip to Washington, D.C., where he met President Abraham Lincoln in the spring of 1862. Nathaniel noted he was "about the homeliest man I ever saw" but that he "liked this sallow, queer, sagacious visage". He visited several sites related to the War and the Army especially in Virginia, where he traveled for a time with writer Nathaniel Parker Willis. He returned to the Wayside on April 10, 1862, and less than a month later sent The Atlantic an essay titled "Chiefly About War Matters by a Peaceable Man". Fields, editor of The Atlantic, had accompanied Nathaniel on the trip at Sophia's request and insisted on changes to the essay. He and publishing partner William Ticknor agreed that comments about President Lincoln's odd features and references to "Uncle Abe" should be omitted. Nathaniel cut the entire section, though he considered it "the only part of the article really worth publishing" and lamented, "What a terrible thing it is to try to let off a little bit of truth into this miserable humbug of a world!" The Atlantic received very "cruel and terrible notes", Fields claimed, after the article was published.

In his later years, Nathaniel was especially concerned about the financial situation his family would face after his death. Living at The Wayside cost the family $2,500 a year, despite attempts to live frugally by refusing to hire help to take care of the house and grounds. He noted to his publisher Ticknor that he expected to "die in the alms-house". In the late spring of 1864, Nathaniel took ill and traveled with his friend, the former President of the United States Franklin Pierce. It was on this trip that Nathaniel died on May 19, 1864. On hearing the news, Louisa May Alcott sent the family a bouquet of violets picked from Nathaniel's walking path by the Wayside. Annie Adams Fields, wife of the publisher, noted in her journal after a visit in April 1865, "What an altered household! She [Sophia] feels very lonely, and is like a reed. I fear the children will find small restraint from her... Will God spare her further trial?" Sophia and the three children moved to England shortly after; she sold The Wayside in 1870.

== The Lathrops and the Lothrops ==
The home was purchased in Spring 1879 by George Parsons Lathrop, an author and husband of Hawthorne's daughter Rose. Rose and George Lathrop lived there with their son Francis. Rose, who had lived there twice before, hoped it would be a happy time for her young family, but it was not; their son contracted diphtheria. As she wrote to Lillian Aldrich, wife of author Thomas Bailey Aldrich, "Sitting here so much alone in this old house, The Wayside, as I have done of late, I see things between slumber and waking, a bright, queer time for insights, though they are always sad ones; and I wonder if all the saints about us avert anything except from themselves. Amelioration is sometimes quite another thing, and sometimes I detest." The Lathrops moved out on February 6, 1881, the day young Francis died.

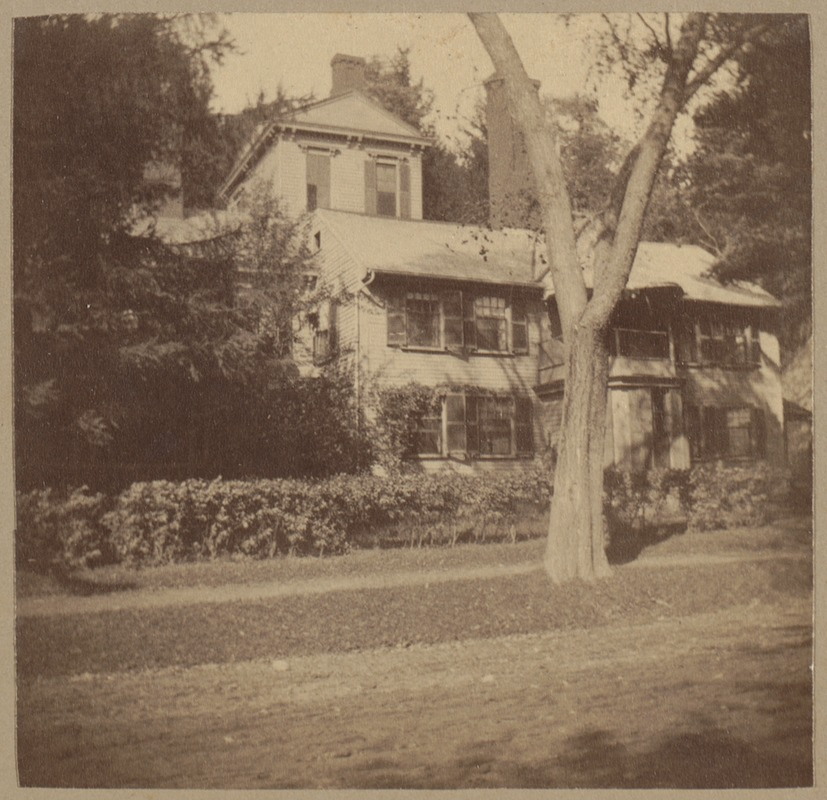
The Wayside, ca. 1895–1905. Archive of Photographic Documentation of Early Massachusetts Architecture, Boston Public Library.

In 1883, The Wayside was bought by Boston publisher Daniel Lothrop and his wife, Harriett. Harriett was the author of the Five Little Peppers series and other children's books using the pen name Margaret Sidney. The Lothrops added town water in 1883, central heating in 1888, and electric lighting in 1904, as well as a large piazza on the west side in 1887. The room that, after 1860, had served as Julian Hawthorne's bedroom became Mrs. Lothrop's dining room.

The Lothrops helped oversee a several-day celebration in honor of Nathaniel Hawthorne's centennial in 1904. Speeches were given, letters were read in public, and a tablet was dedicated by Beatrix Hawthorne (daughter of Julian) marking the larch path where the author often walked. Hawthorne's daughter Rose, then known as Mother Mary Alphonsa and leading the Dominican Sisters of Hawthorne in New York, declined to attend. "I have no prospect whatever of being able to be present", she wrote, "I have tried very hard for a couple of years to leave my work among the poor, to go to Concord, or its neighborhood, but have been prevented very imperatively". She particularly noted her work caring for the sick and dying kept her occupied.

== Modern history ==
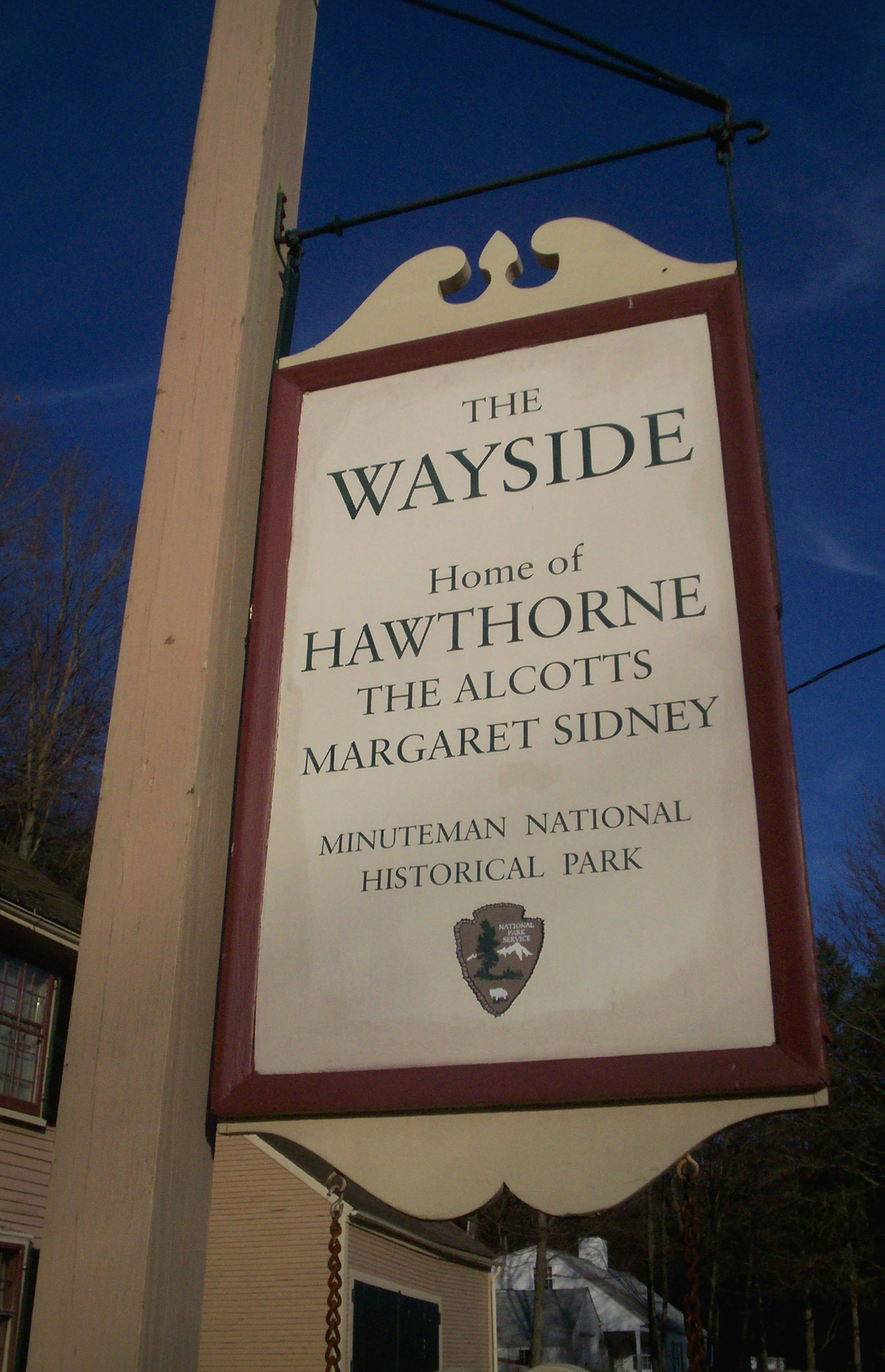
Today, The Wayside is administered by the National Park Service and is open to the public.

After Margaret Sidney's death in 1924, the home was inherited by her daughter; she opened the home to the public in 1927. Margaret Sidney, as she was also named, spent 40 years caring for the home, researching and writing about its history, and providing tours. The home stayed in the Lothrop family until 1965.

In 1963, The Wayside was designated a National Historic Landmark, and became part of Minute Man National Historical Park on June 15, 1965. This designation came with the aid of the Lothrops' daughter Margaret, and it became the first literary site to be acquired by the National Park Service.

The Wayside was renovated in 1969 and 1970. For the decades following, the National Park Service offered only minor repairs until the building was closed in 2013 for major restoration. It reopened in June 2016. The interior is preserved to reflect the period of Margaret Sidney's death in 1924.

Today, The Wayside is open to the public seasonally for guided tours. Its address is 455 Lexington Road in Concord.

== See also ==
- House of the Seven Gables
- Reuben Brown House
- List of National Historic Landmarks in Massachusetts
- List of Underground Railroad sites
- National Register of Historic Places listings in Concord, Massachusetts

== Sources ==
- Felton, R. Todd. A Journey into the Transcendentalists' New England. Berkeley, California: Roaring Forties Press, 2006. ISBN 0-9766706-4-X
- Levine, Miriam. A Guide to Writers' Homes in New England. Cambridge, Massachusetts: Apple-wood Books, 1984. ISBN 0-918222-51-6
- Matteson, John. Eden's Outcasts: The Story of Louisa May Alcott and Her Father. New York: W. W. Norton & Company, 2007. ISBN 978-0-393-33359-6
- McFarland, Philip. Hawthorne in Concord. New York: Grove Press, 2004. ISBN 0-8021-1776-7
- Miller, Edwin Haviland. Salem Is My Dwelling Place: A Life of Nathaniel Hawthorne. Iowa City: University of Iowa Press, 1991. ISBN 0-87745-381-0
- Saxton, Martha. Louisa May Alcott: A Modern Biography. New York: Farrar, Straus and Gireaux, 1995 (first published 1977): 158. ISBN 0-374-52460-2
- Schreiner, Samuel A. Jr. The Concord Quartet: Alcott, Emerson, Hawthorne, Thoreau and the Friendship That Freed the American Mind. Hoboken, NJ: Wiley & Sons, 2006. 978–0471646631
- Valenti, Patricia Dunlavy. To Myself A Stranger: A Biography of Rose Hawthorne Lathrop. Baton Rouge, LA: Louisiana State University Press, 1991. ISBN 0-8071-1612-2
- Wilson, Susan. Literary Trail of Greater Boston. Boston: Houghton Mifflin Company, 2000. ISBN 0-618-05013-2
- Wineapple, Brenda. Hawthorne: A Life. New York: Random House, 2003. ISBN 0-8129-7291-0
- Wright, John Hardy. Hawthorne's Haunts in New England. Charleston, SC: The History Press, 2008. ISBN 978-1-59629-425-7
