= Julian Hawthorne =

American author and poet (1846–1934)

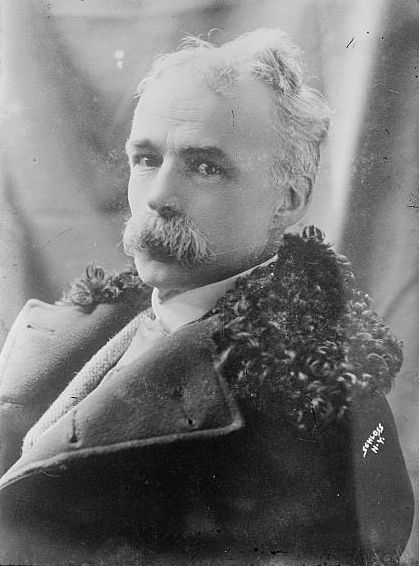
- Hawthorne in 1911
- Born: June 22, 1846; Salem, Massachusetts, U.S.
- Died: July 14, 1934 (aged 88); San Francisco, California, U.S.
- Occupations: Novelist; short story writer; journalist
- Spouses: Minne Amelung (m. 1870; died 1925) Edith Garrigues (m. 1925)
- Children: 8, including Hildegarde Hawthorne
- Parent(s): Nathaniel Hawthorne; Sophia Peabody

Julian Hawthorne (June 22, 1846 – July 14, 1934) was an American writer and journalist, the son of novelist Nathaniel Hawthorne and Sophia Peabody. He wrote numerous poems, novels, short stories, mysteries and detective fiction, essays, travel books, biographies, and histories.

== Biography ==
=== Birth and childhood ===
Julian Hawthorne was the second child of Nathaniel Hawthorne and Sophia Peabody Hawthorne. He was born June 22, 1846, at 14 Mall Street in Salem, Massachusetts. It was shortly after sunrise and his father wrote to his sister:

A small troglodyte made his appearance here at ten minutes to six o'clock, this morning, who claims to be your nephew and the heir of all our wealth and honors. He has dark hair and is no great beauty at present, but is said to be a particularly fine little urchin by everybody who has seen him.

His parents had difficulty choosing a name for eight months. Possible names included George, Arthur, Edward, Horace, Robert, and Lemuel. His father referred to him for some time as "Bundlebreech" or "Black Prince", due to his dark curls and red cheeks. As a boy, Julian was well-behaved and good-natured. He was raised in a loving household, later reflecting: "it was almost appalling to be the subject of such limitless devotion and affection." Julian and his siblings were raised in a positive environment and his parents did not believe in harsh discipline or physical punishment. His father used Julian as an inspiration for the character of Sweet Fern in his children's books A Wonder-Book for Girls and Boys and Tanglewood Tales.

The Hawthorne family eventually lived in Concord, Massachusetts, at a home they called The Wayside. There, Julian attended a school run by Franklin Benjamin Sanborn. The school was coeducational, though Julian's sisters Una and Rose did not attend. His parents disapproved particularly of dances hosted by the school. His mother Sophia wrote: "We entirely disapprove of this commingling of youths and maidens at the electric age in school. I find no end of ill effect from it, and this is why I do not send Una and Rose to your school." Young Julian was close friends with his neighbors at the Orchard House, the Alcott family, and pursued a relationship with the older Abigail May Alcott while he was a young teenager. He later spread the rumor that he inspired the character Laurie in Louisa May Alcott's 1868 novel Little Women, which she denied.

=== Education and early career ===
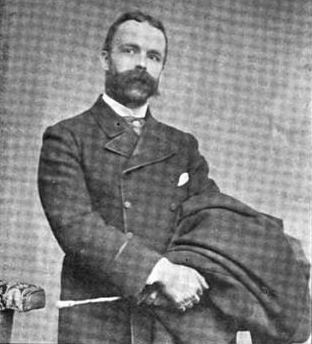
Portrait of Julian Hawthorne

Hawthorne entered Harvard College in 1863, but did not graduate. He was tutored privately in German by James Russell Lowell, a professor and writer who encouraged Nathaniel Hawthorne's work. It was during his freshman year at Harvard that he learned of his father's death, coincidentally the same day he was initiated into a fraternity. Years later, he wrote of the incident:

I was initiated into a college secret society—a couple of hours of grotesque and good-humored rodomontade and horseplay, in which I cooperated as in a kind of pleasant nightmare, confident, even when branded with a red-hot iron or doused head-over heels in boiling oil, that it would come out all right. The neophyte is effectively blindfolded during the proceedings, and at last, still sightless, I was led down flights of steps into a silent crypt and helped into a coffin, where I was to stay until the Resurrection ... Thus it was that just as my father passed from this earth, I was lying in a coffin during my initiation into Delta Kappa Epsilon.

After his father's death, Hawthorne considered himself head of the household, quit Harvard, and abandoned his interest in joining the army. He took over his father's study in the tower of The Wayside and, his mother recalled, the difficult time "made a man of him, for he feels all the care of me and his sisters".

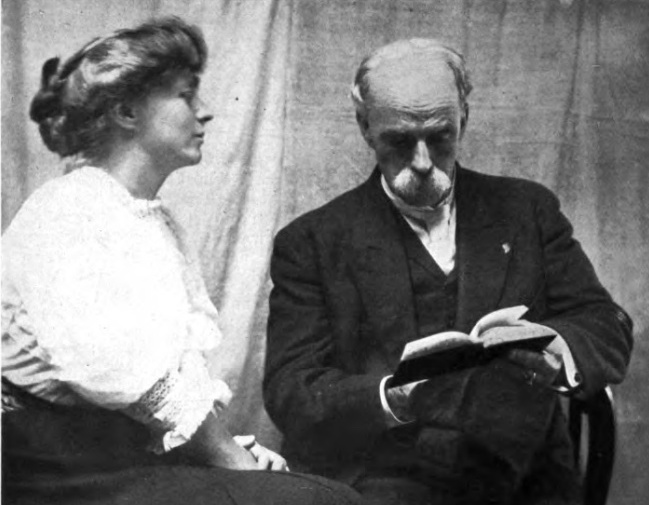
Julian Hawthorne with his eldest daughter, writer Hildegarde Hawthorne, from a 1907 publication

Hawthorne studied civil engineering in the United States and Germany, was engineer in the New York City Dock Department under General McClellan (1870–72), spent 10 years abroad, and met Minne Amelung. She and Hawthorne were married in Orange, New Jersey, on November 15, 1870.

=== Writing career ===
While in Europe Hawthorne wrote several novels: Bressant (1873); Idolatry (1874); Garth (1874); Archibald Malmaison (1879); and Sebastian Strome (1880). Hawthorne prepared an edition of his father's unfinished work Dr. Grimshawe's Secret (1883). His sister Rose, upon hearing of the book's announcement, had not known about the fragment and originally thought her brother was guilty of forgery or a hoax. She published the accusation in the New York Tribune on August 16, 1882, and claimed, "No such unprinted work has been in existence ... It cannot be truthfully published as anything but an experimental fragment". He defended himself from the charge, however, and eventually dedicated the book to his sister and her husband George Parsons Lathrop.

In July 1883, Hawthorne was invited to participate as a lecturer at the Concord School of Philosophy by his former neighbors Amos Bronson Alcott and Sanborn. Hawthorne presented a version of a paper he had recently published, "Agnosticism in American Fiction", which criticized the emerging American Realism movement and took aim particularly at William Dean Howells and Henry James, whose works Hawthorne believed represented "life and humanity not in their loftier, but in their lesser manifestations". Hawthorne returned the following summer to present "Emerson as an American".

Hawthorne published the first of two books about his parents, Nathaniel Hawthorne and His Wife, in 1884–85. The younger Hawthorne also wrote a critique of his father's novel The Scarlet Letter that was published in The Atlantic Monthly in April 1886.

Julian Hawthorne published an article in the October 24, 1886, issue of the New York World based on a long interview with James Russell Lowell, who had recently served as a U.S. diplomat to England. In the article, titled "Lowell in a Chatty Mood", Hawthorne reported that Lowell offered various negative comments on British royalty and politicians, like saying that the Prince of Wales was "immensely fat". Lowell angrily complained that the article made him seem like "a toothless old babbler".

Between 1887 and 1888, Hawthorne published a series of detective fiction novels following the character Inspector Barnes, including The Great Bank Robbery, An American Penman, A Tragic Mystery, Section 558, and Another's Crime. The character was strongly based on Hawthorne's friend and real-life detective Thomas F. Byrnes. In 1889 there were reports that Hawthorne was one of several writers who had, under the name of "Arthur Richmond", published in the North American Review devastating attacks on President Grover Cleveland and other leading Americans. Hawthorne denied the reports.

In 1895, Hawthorne was one of several authors and journalists wooed to work for William Randolph Hearst and his syndicate of newspapers, along with writers Stephen Crane, Richard Harding Davis, Murat Halstead, Alfred Henry Lewis, Edgar Wilson Nye, Julian Ralph, and Edgar Saltus. Hawthorne published a second book about his father, Hawthorne and His Circle, in 1903. In it, he responded to a remark from his father's friend Herman Melville that Nathaniel Hawthorne had a "secret". Julian dismissed this, claiming Melville was inclined to think so only because "there were many secrets untold in his own career", causing much speculation. As he wrote of his meeting with Melville,

When I was in New York, in 1884, I met him, looking pale, sombre, nervous, but little touched by age. He died a few years later. He conceived the highest admiration for my father's genius, and a deep affection for him personally; but he told me, during our talk, that he was convinced that there was some secret in my father's life which had never been revealed, and which accounted for the gloomy passages in his books. It was characteristic in him to imagine so; there were many secrets untold in his own career. But there were few honester or more lovable men than Herman Melville.

As a journalist, he reported on the Indian Famine for Cosmopolitan magazine and the Spanish–American War for the New York Journal.

=== Fraud and imprisonment ===
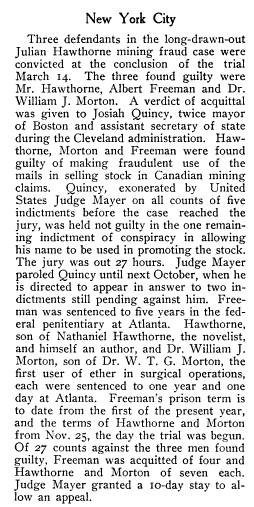
An article on Hawthorne's conviction in Mining Science, 1913

In 1908, Hawthorne's old Harvard friend William J. Morton (a physician) invited Hawthorne to join in promoting some newly created mining companies in Ontario, Canada. Hawthorne made his writing and his family name central to the stock-selling campaigns. After complaints from shareholders, both Morton and Hawthorne were tried in New York City for mail fraud, and convicted in 1913. Hawthorne was able to sell some three and a half million shares of stock in a nonexistent silver mine and served one year in the Atlanta Federal Penitentiary.

Upon his release from prison, he wrote The Subterranean Brotherhood (1914), a nonfiction work calling for an immediate end to incarceration of criminals. Hawthorne argued, based on his own experience, that incarceration was inhumane and should be replaced by moral suasion. Of the fraud with which he was charged he always maintained his innocence.

=== Final years and death ===
After his release from prison on October 15, 1913, Hawthorne returned to work as a journalist in Boston for the Boston American, for which he covered baseball spring training and interviewed George Stallings and Babe Ruth. He resigned from the publication in November and moved to California, where he contributed to publications like the Los Angeles Herald and pitched movie screenplays which were never produced. He also shared a home with his lover Edith Garrigues. His wife Minne was living with family in Redding, Connecticut. After her death on June 25, 1925, Hawthorne and Garrigues officially married on July 6 after nearly two decades as a couple. In the summer of 1933, Hawthorne suffered from a flu, after which he was never fully healthy again. He suffered two heart attacks before dying on July 14, 1934. His funeral was private and, after his body was cremated, his ashes were scattered along Newport Beach, California.

== Works ==
- Bressant (1873)
- Idolatry: A Romance (1874)
- Garth (1874)
- Saxon Studies (1876)
- Archibald Malmaison (1879)
- Sebastian Strome (1880)
- Dust (1882)
- Beatrix Randolph (1883)
- Nathaniel Hawthorne and His Wife: A Biography (1884)
- The Great Bank Robbery (1887)
- An American Penman (1887)
- A Tragic Mystery (1887)
- The Professor's Sister: A Romance (1888)
- Section 558 (1888)
- Another's Crime (1888)
- The Golden Fleece (1892)
- An American Monte Cristo (1893)
- American Literature: A Text Book for the Use of Schools and Colleges (1896, with Leonard Lemmon)
- A Fool of Nature (1896)
- One of Those Coincidences and Ten Other Stories (1899)
- The History of the United States Vol. 1-3 (1898/1912)
- Hawthorne and His Circle (1903)
- The Lock and Key Library: Classic Mystery and Detective Stories (1909, editor)
- The Subterranean Brotherhood (1914)
- The Cosmic Courtship (1917)
- A Goth From Boston (1919)
- Sara Was Judith (1920)
- Rumpty-Dudget's Tower: A Fairy Tale (1924)
- The Memoirs of Julian Hawthorne (1938; edited by Edith Garrigues Hawthorne and published posthumously)
