= Rose Hawthorne Lathrop =

American religious sister (1851–1926)

Venerable Mother Mary Alphonsa OP
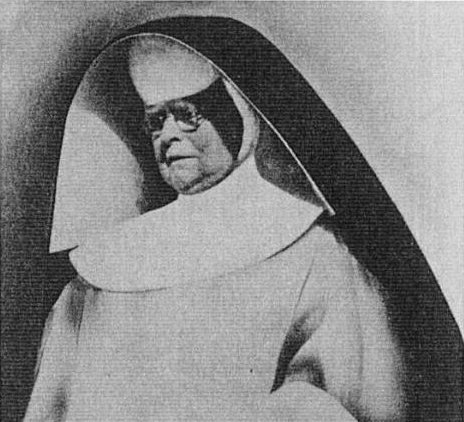
- Mother Mary Alphonsa in her habit
- Born: Rose Hawthorne; May 20, 1851; Lenox, Massachusetts, U.S.
- Died: July 9, 1926 (aged 75); New York City, New York, U.S.

Rose Hawthorne Lathrop, OP, religious name Mary Alphonsa, (May 20, 1851 – July 9, 1926), was an American Dominican religious sister, writer, social worker, and founder of the Dominican Sisters of Hawthorne.

== Early life and education ==
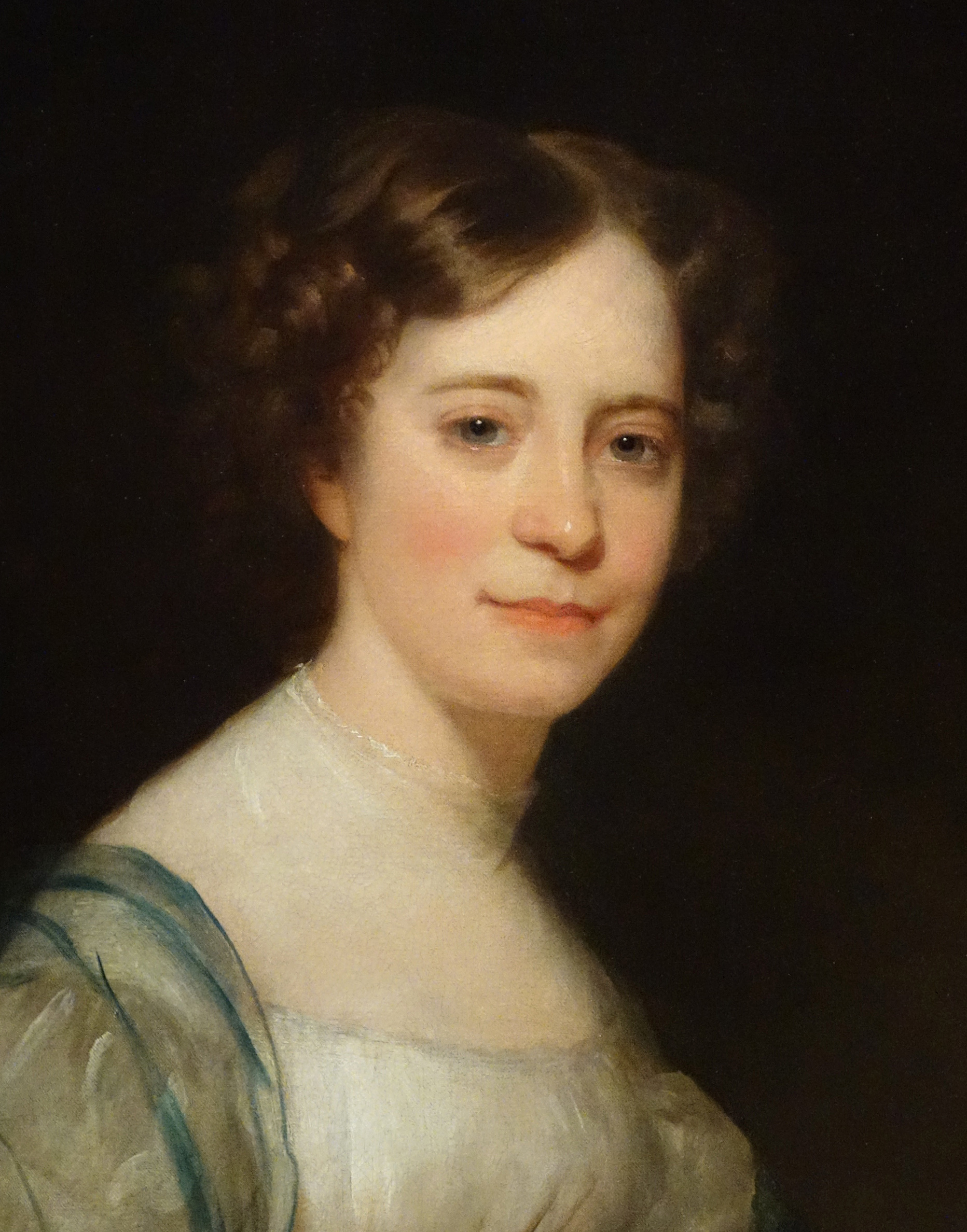
Sophia Peabody Hawthorne

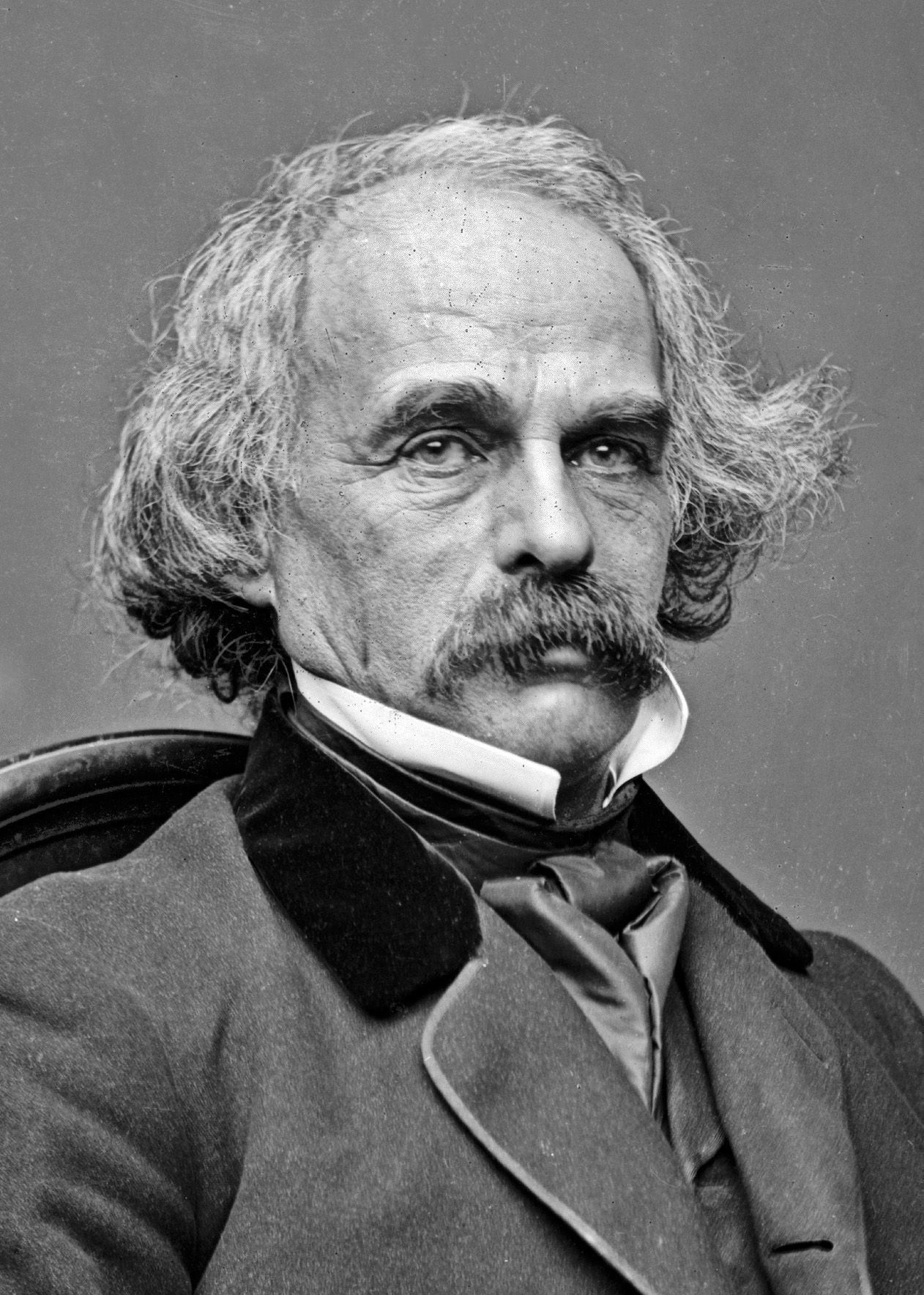
Nathaniel Hawthorne

The parents of Rose Hawthorne Lathrop

Rose Hawthorne was born on May 20, 1851, in Lenox, Massachusetts, to the author Nathaniel Hawthorne and his wife, the artist Sophia Peabody. Sophia's father, the physician Nathaniel Peabody, assisted in the birth. Nathaniel wrote about the baby to his friend, the US Navy officer Horatio Bridge, comparing her birth to the publication of a book:

"Mrs. Hawthorne published a little work, two months ago, which still lies in sheets; but, I assure you, it makes some noise in the world, both by day and night. In plain English, we have another little red-headed daughter—a very bright, strong, and healthy imp, but, at present, with no pretentions to beauty."

In July 1851, Sophia took Rose and her older sister, Una, to visit relatives in West Newton, Massachusetts. That same year, the Hawthorne family moved to Concord, Massachusetts, Nathaniel's former home. When Rose turned three, her father was named as the American consul in Liverpool, England. During this time in Europe, the family made several trips to Rome, along with visits to London, Florence and the German states.Rose was very impressed at seeing Pope Pius IX speak from the balcony of his apartment in Vatican City. The Hawthorne family returned to Concord in 1860. Many literary figures visited the Hawthorne home, including the novelist Herman Melville and the essayist Henry David Thoreau. According to authors Peggy Miller and Grace Cho, Rose and her siblings were raised in a positive environment as Nathaniel and Sophia did not believe in harsh discipline or physical punishment.Rose was very closed to her father and shared his sadness at the plight of the poor. Her mother told Rose once

It is not what you want to do for the sick poor, but what they want to do or have you do that matters. And you must never make them feel that there is anything distressing to you in their appearance or actions.

Rose's older brother, the future author Julian Hawthorne, was enrolled in a co-educational school run by the author Franklin Benjamin Sanborn. The family friend, the poet Ellery Channing, recommended that Nathaniel and Sophia send the Hawthorne girls to Julian's school. The parents ignored her advice. Sophia wrote:

"We entirely disapprove of this commingling of youths and maidens at the electric age in school. I find no end of ill effect from it, and this is why I do not send Una and Rose to your school."

Two years after Nathaniel's death in 1864, Sophia enrolled Rose at a boarding school run by the physician Diocletian Lewis in Lexington, Massachusetts; she disliked the experience and did not remain there very long.Dealing with a loss of income from Nathaniel's death, Sophia took the children to Dresden in the Kingdom of Saxony (present-day Germany) in 1865 to complete their education. While in Dresden, the family met the future poet George Parsons Lathrop, the son of a doctor from New York City. The start of the Franco-Prussian War in 1870 forced the Hawthorne and Lathrop families to move to London. While in England, Rose took art classes at the Government School of Design in London

Sophia died in England in February 1871. In September 1871, Rose Hawthorne and George Lathrop were married at the Anglican Church of St Luke in Chelsea, London. The couple then returned to New York City, where George lived. Una remained in London to do volunteer work in a settlement house.

== Literary career and marriage ==
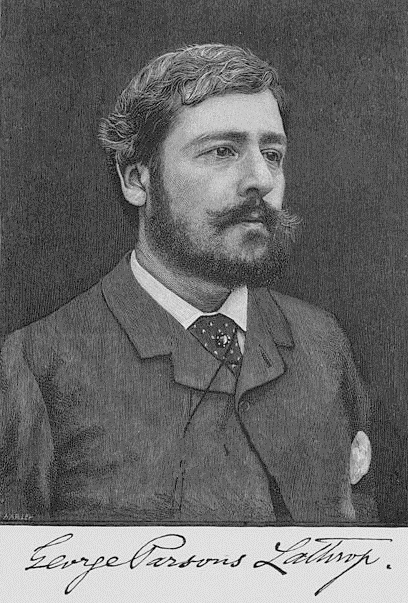
George Lathrop

Once in New York, Rose Hawthorne and George Lathrop began writing short stories, articles and book reviews. Hawthorne became a favorite of the New York literary scene, due to her charm and wit as well as her beauty. Lathrop was hired as an associate editor of the Atlantic Monthly and the couple moved back to Massachusetts. In 1876, the Lathrops had a son, Francis. Hawthorne serialized her novel Miss Dilletante in the Boston Courier in 1878, with Lathrop serving as her editor.

In early 1879, the couple purchased her family's former home in Concord, The Wayside, with borrowed funds. In 1881, Francis died of diphtheria at age five. Soon after his death, they returned to New York. Lazarus died from cancer in 1887. In 1883, Julian planned to publish Dr. Grimshawe's Secret, allegedly a manuscript left unfinished by their father. However, Hawthorne suspected Julian of forgery or perpetrating a hoax.

New York was not good for Lathrop's health, so they built a new house in New London, Connecticut, in 1887.One of Rose's closest friends was the poet Emma Lazarus, whom she had befriended in 1881. Lazarus died of cancer in 1887, her suffering having a great effect on her friend. While in New London, Hawthorne and Lathrop met the businessman Alfred Hebard Chappell, who had recently converted to Catholicism. He had many discussions with the couple about his conversion. During this time period, Lathrop had become an alcohol abuser and was dealing with depression. Una had suspected that he abused her sister years before. Lathrop competed with Julian for control of Nathaniel Hawthorne's legacy. She published a book of poems, Along the Shore, in 1888.

They collaborated on a book, A Story of Courage: A History of the Georgetown Visitation Convent, a Catholic monastery in Washington, D.C. During this period, the couple started reading Catholic writings such as Cardinal James Gibbons’ The Faith of Our Fathers (1876), Thomas John Capel’s The Faith of Catholics and Cardinal Nicholas Wiseman's Lectures on the principal doctrines and practices of the Catholic Church (1836). Hawthorne and Lathrop converted to Roman Catholicism in 1891, the ceremony being held at St. Paul the Apostle Church in Manhattan. Though "To many of their old friends this conversion came as a shock", her decision to convert had been years in the making.

Their travels through England, Portugal, France and Italy [had] exposed the Hawthornes to the 'Roman Church,' often misunderstood in the Protestant circles of New England … Hawthorne would write of her experience at the age of seven of seeing Pope Pius IX during Holy Week from his balcony: "I became eloquent about the Pope, and was rewarded by a gift from my mother of a little medallion of him and a gold scudo with an excellent likeness thereon, both always tenderly reverenced by me."

Hawthorne and Lathrop were involved in the establishment of the Catholic Summer School of America project, located in New London and Plattsburgh, New York. Attendees had the benefits of university-level courses on Catholicism in resort settings.The couple were commissioned by the Georgetown Visitation Nuns to write A Story of Courage: A History of the Georgetown Visitation Convent, their convent in Washington D.C.

Hawthorne in 1895 petitioned the Catholic Church for a separation from Lathrop; his mental state had deteriorated so much that she felt unsafe when his had his outbursts of anger.

== Nursing cancer patients ==
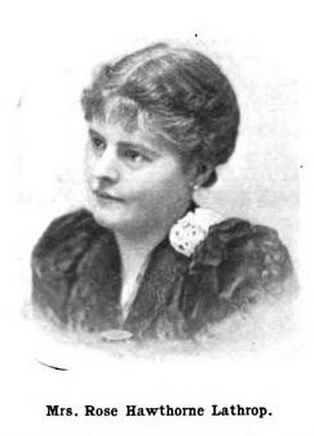
Rose Hawthorne Lathrop, from an 1897 publication

At this stage in her life, Hawthorne sought greater purpose. She spent time with the Sisters of Charity of Saint Vincent de Paul in Wellesley Hills, Massachusetts, becoming inspired by their motto, "I am for God and for the poor." Hawthorne recalled that her friend Lazarus had received nursing care while she was dying, unlike other cancer sufferers who were poor. Hawthorne later wrote,

"Though I grieved deeply for her [Lazarus], I would not pity her, for she never knew unaided suffering, but every amelioration."

In the summer of 1896, at age 45, Hawthorne trained for three months as a nurse at the New York Cancer Hospital. Today this is Memorial Sloan Kettering Cancer Center. This was the first hospital in the United States to provide training in treating cancer. At that time, the general hospitals in New York City would not admit patients with cancer, which then had a very high death rate.

In October 1896, Hawthorne rented a three-room apartment in a tenement on Grant Street on the Lower East Side of Manhattan, a poor immigrant neighborhood.Cancer patients, both men and women, would come to the apartment for Hawthorne to change dressings on leg ulcers. She also visited them at their homes, with the help of her assistant, Alice Huber. They also help the sick pay rent and cooked food and did housework for women suffering from tuberculosis. During this period, she also published a biography of her father, Memories of Hawthorne.

Soon Hawthorne was allowing female cancer patients to stay at the apartment as they had no other place to go. Although Hawthorne received some donations and assistance from doctors, she and her co-workers had a heavy workload and few financial resources When Lathrop was on his deathbed in 1898, Hawthorne went to be with him.

After observing their work in February 1899, the Dominican priest Clement Thuente, encouraged Hawthorne and Huber to join the Dominican Order as tertiaries. After receiving donations from some wealthy individuals, Hawthorne with more helpers opened St. Rose's Free Home for Incurable Cancer on Cherry Street in Manhattan, a larger facility for female cancer patients. It was placed under the patronage of Rose of Lima.

During this time, Julian termed his sister's care for the sick as an attempt at martyrdom, writing, "Nothing less than the extreme would satisfy her thirst for self-sacrifice." Explaining why she wanted to help poor people with terminal disease, Hawthorne told about a woman who was a dressmaker during the 1890s. The woman had cancer and had no one to take care of her. She convinced doctors that she should be admitted to a mental hospital on Blackwell's Island (now Roosevelt Island) in New York City, where she would receive it.

== Dominican Sisters of Hawthorne ==
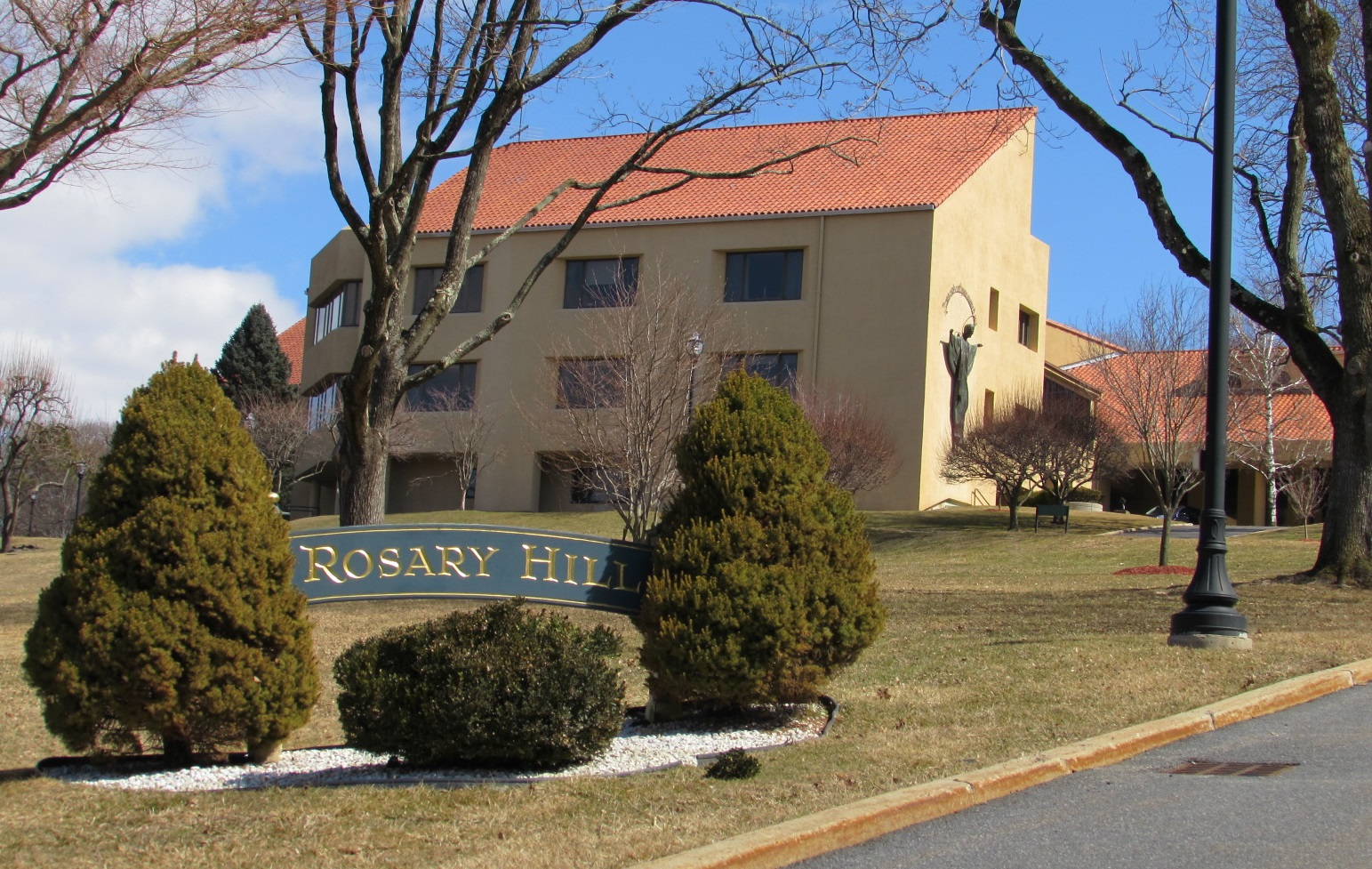
Rosary Hill Home, Hawthorne, New York

In September 1899, Archbishop Michael Corrigan approved the creation of a new congregation of Dominican sisters, with Hawthorne and Huber as its new members. He made this remark,

“You have passed through a long, hard novitiate and I am going to give you permission to wear the Dominican Habit, pronounce your first vows and form a Community.”

They called themselves the Servants of Relief for Incurable Cancer, but in 1900 it became officially the Dominican Sisters of Hawthorne.

In 1901, Hawthorne was able to buy a mansion previously owned by the French Dominicans in the rural Sherman Park neighborhood of Hawthorne, New York. Called Rosary Hill Home, the mansion was expense to operate and maintain, but it allow the Dominicans to admit male cancer patients for the first time. The Dominicans would be honest to their patients, not raising false hopes. They gave them the best of care for free, but refused to subject them to experimental treatments. Hawthorne would live at Rosary Hill for the rest of her life.

Hawthorne and Huber in 1909 made their perpetual vows. Hawthorne became its first mother superior, assuming the name Mary Alphonsa. Huber assumed the religious name Rose and was put in charge of the St. Rose Home in 1910.Julian was convicted of mail fraud in 1913 and sentenced to one year in federal prison. Hawthorne traveled to Washington in April 1913, to seek a pardon from President Woodrow Wilson. The request was denied; Julian was angered by her intervention.After the American entry into World War I in 1917, the sisters struggled with decreased donations and increased costs; Hawthorne battled a serious illness during this period.

By 1922, the sisters had received large donations from people across the country. A new building was erected at Rosary Hill. Hawthorne had speaking engagements throughout the region. In June 2026, she began planning for another building at Rosary Hill,

== Death and legacy ==
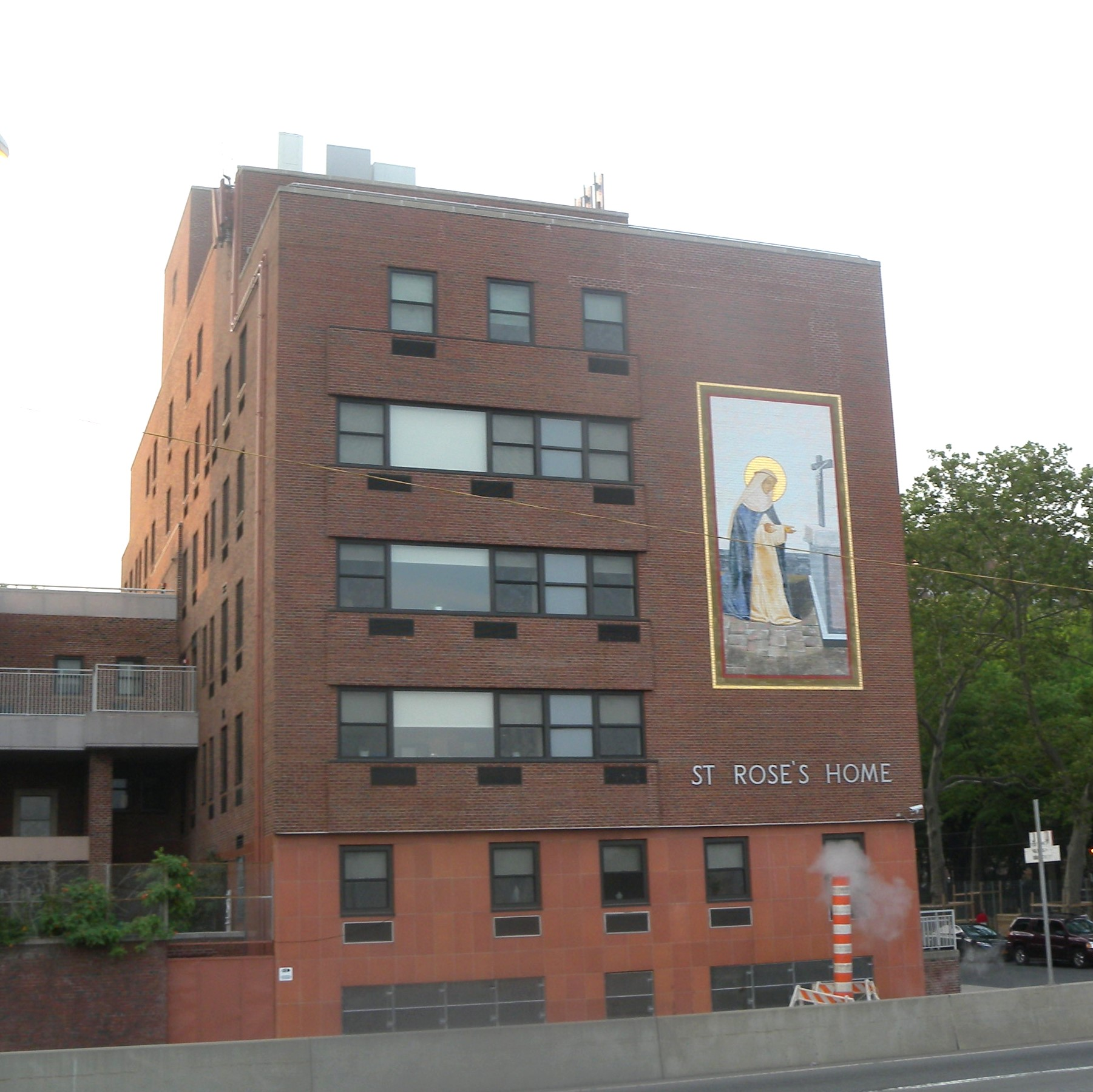
St. Rose's Home, Manhattan

On July 8, 1926, Hawthorne wrote letters asking for donations until nearly 10 o'clock before going to bed. When a sister went to wake her the next morning, July 9th, she was found deceased. She was buried at the motherhouse at Rosary Hill.

- Hawthorne received a medal from the National Institute of Social Sciences for notable achievement in 1914
- In 1925, she was awarded an honorary Master of Arts degree from Bowdoin College in Brunswick, Maine.
- In April 1926, the Rotary Club of New York presented her with a service medal, calling a "soldier of love, a friend of the poor, organizer of rare ability, hope of the hopeless"

In 2009, the St. Rose's Home in Manhattan closed, due to the decreasing number of sisters in the congregation. As of 2026, Rosary Hill Home is still a hospice for cancer patients, operated by the Dominican Sisters of Hawthorne.

== Veneration ==
The Rose Hawthorne Guild was established in 2003 to promote her beatification. That same year, Cardinal Edward Egan, archbishop of New York, approved the cause for Hawthorne's beatification. On March 14, 2024, Pope Francis declared her Venerable, the final step before beatification.

== Publications ==
- Miss Dilletante, 1878[9]
- Along the Shore, 1888
- A Story of Courage: A History of the Georgetown Visitation Convent
- Memories of Hawthorne
