= Francis Lathrop =

American painter (1849–1909)

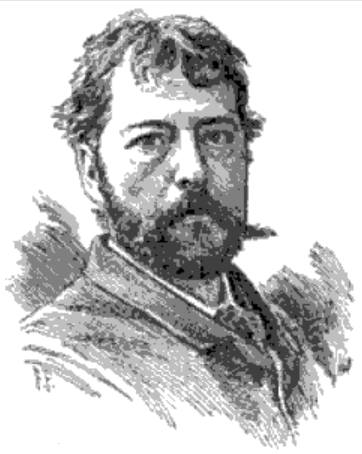
- Born: Francis Augustus Lathrop; June 22, 1849; At sea near the Hawaiian Islands
- Died: October 18, 1909 (aged 60); Woodcliff Lake, New Jersey
- Occupation: Artist

Francis Augustus Lathrop (June 22, 1849 – October 18, 1909) was an American decorative artist known for his creation of stained glass and other decorative works in churches and university chapels in the United States.

== Biography ==
=== Early life ===
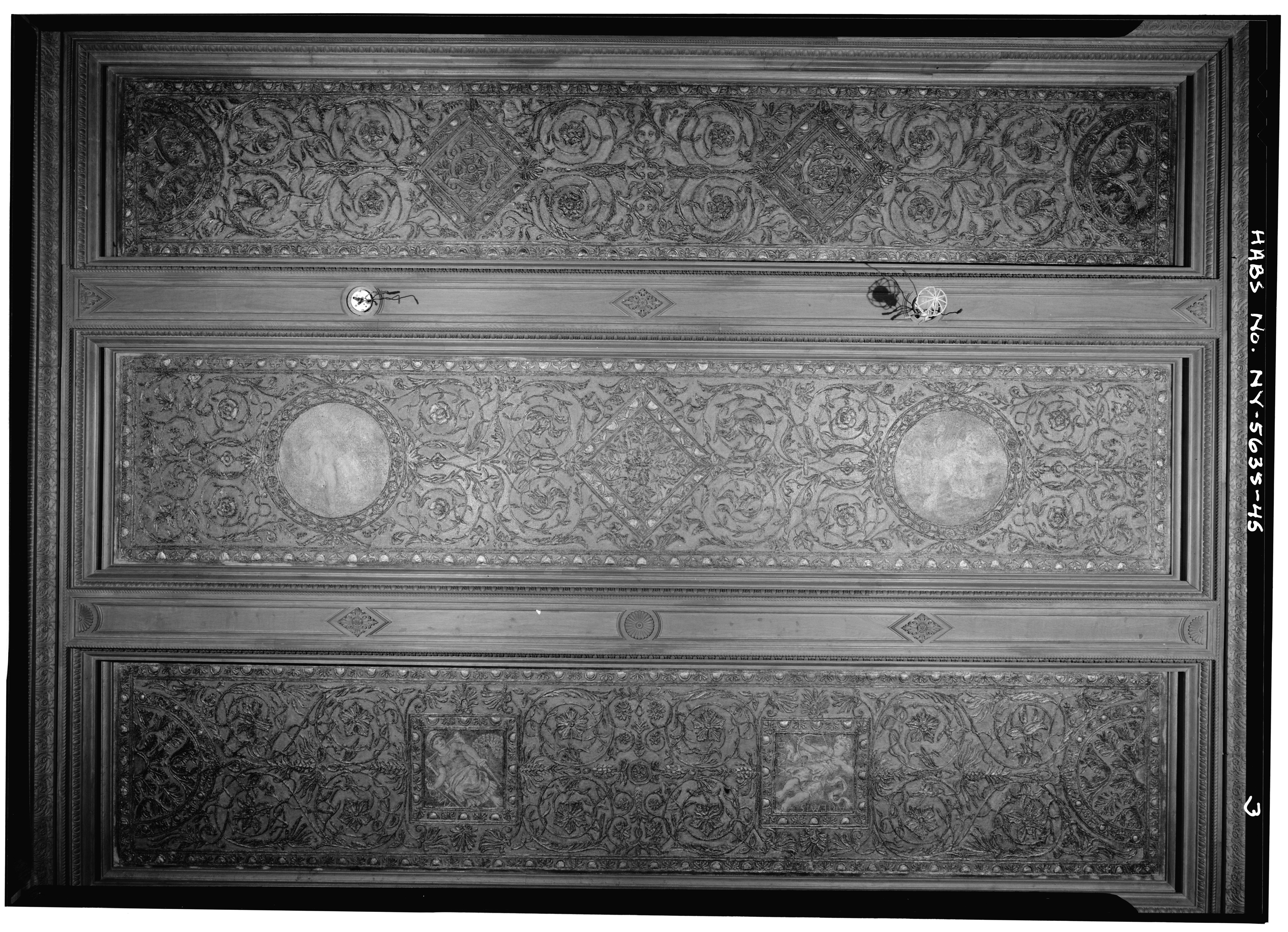
Dining room ceiling in New York City residence that was decorated by Francis Lathrop

Francis Lathrop was born on June 22, 1849, on a ship off the Hawaiian Islands. He was a great grandson of the American Revolutionary War General Samuel Holden Parsons. Francis Lathrop's father was George Alfred Lathrop, the American consul to the Kingdom of Hawaii. His brother was the poet George Lathrop.

=== Training as artist ===
Francis Lathrop was a pupil of the painter T. C. Farrer in New York City, and then studied art at the Royal Academy of Dresden in what was then the German Empire. After Lathrop spent four months of study in Dresden, the artist James Whistler invited Lathrop to study with him in London. However, soon after his arrival in England, the family's financial problems forced Lathrop to return to New York City. After a year of giving drawing lessons in New York, he was able to rejoin Whistler in England. In 1870, dissatisfied with the attention he was receiving from Whistler, Lathrop began working with the painters Ford Madox Brown and Edward Coley Burne-Jones. He also studied in the school of designer William Morris, where he devoted particular attention to stained glass.

=== Career ===
In 1873, Lathrop again returned to New York to help his family financially. He taught painting at Cooper Institute in Manhattan and became known for his illustrations, painted portraits, and designed stained glass. At this point in his career, Lathrop concentrated on producing decorative work. He designed the chancel of Trinity Church in Boston, Massachusetts, decorated the interior of the Bowdoin College Chapel in Brunswick, Maine, and decorated several churches in New York. The Marquand Memorial Window, installed in the original Marquand chapel at Princeton University, was an example of Lathrop's work in stained glass. The chapel and the Lathrop window were destroyed by fire in 1922. Lathrop's last work was a series of medallions for the building of the Hispanic-American Society in Manhattan.

Lathrop was a charter member of the Society of American Artists, and became an associate of the National Academy of Design in New York. He died at his home in Woodcliff Lake, New Jersey, on October 18, 1909.
