= Dominican Sisters of Hawthorne =

Roman Catholic religious congregation

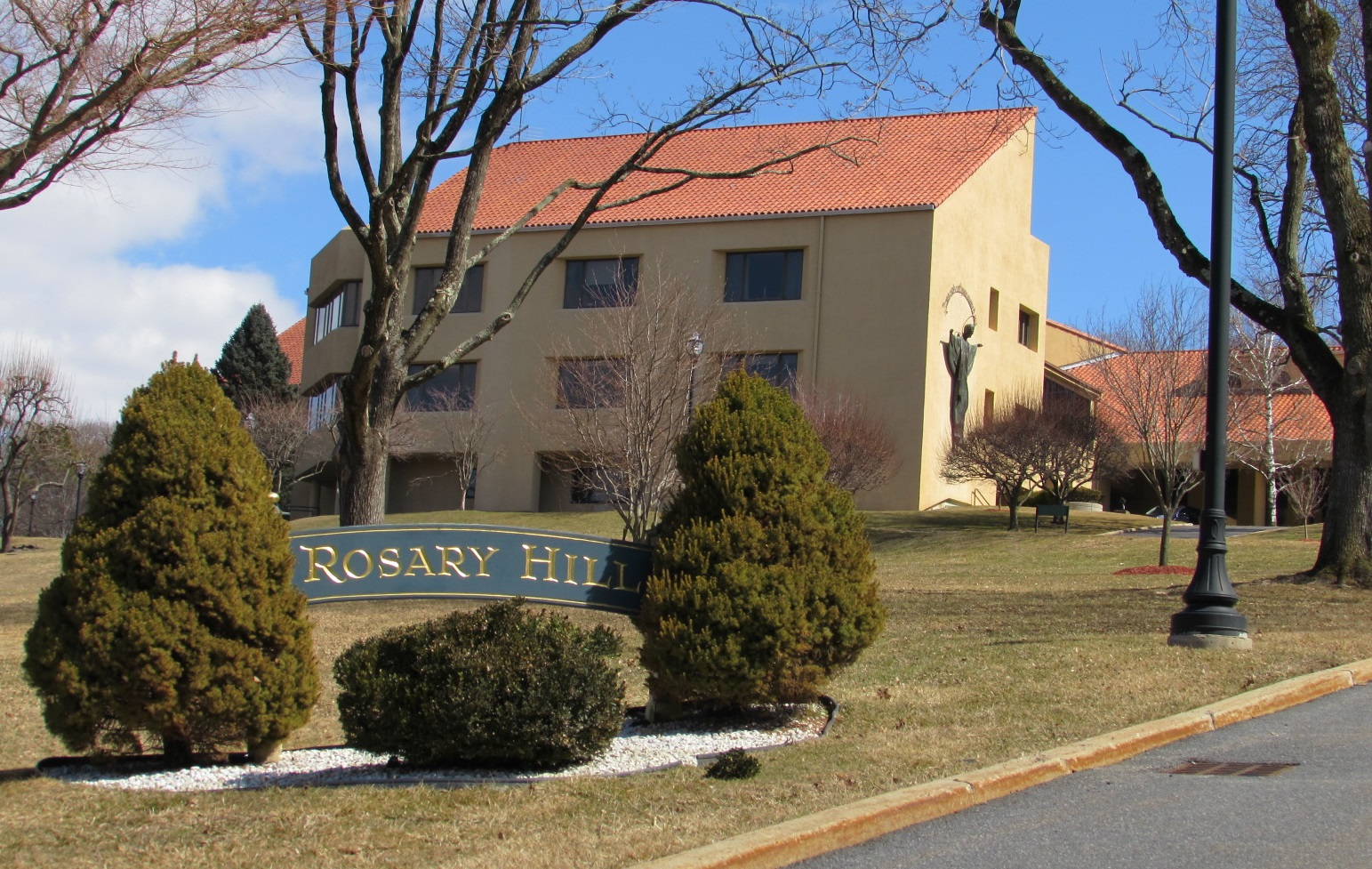
- Exterior of Rosary Hill Home in Hawthorne, New York
- Abbreviation: O.P.
- Formation: 1900; 126 years ago
- Founder: Rose Hawthorne Lathrop
- Type: Catholic religious order
- Headquarters: Rosary Hill Home in Hawthorne, New York
- Superior General: Mother Mary Francis Lepore, O.P.
- Ministry: Care of poor afflicted with cancer
- Motto: The Servants of Relief for Incurable Cancer
- Parent organization: Roman Catholic Church
- Website: hawthorne-dominicans.org

The Dominican Sisters of Hawthorne are a Roman Catholic congregation of religious sisters, who are a part of the Third Order of Saint Dominic. The Congregation was founded on December 8, 1900, by Rose Hawthorne Lathrop, a daughter of the famed novelist Nathaniel Hawthorne. They specialize in caring for those suffering from terminal cancer and have no financial resources.

== History ==
Early in life, Rose Hawthorne married George Parsons Lathrop, both of whom converted to Roman Catholicism in 1891. Rose had seemingly married well as a young woman, and they moved from her native Massachusetts to New York City and then to Connecticut after their marriage. Her husband soon turned out to be unreliable and difficult. Eventually she was driven in 1895 to seek permission from the Church to live apart from him, and this was granted.

Finding herself alone and with few financial resources, she began to seek some meaning to her life. She learned of the plight of the poor who were diagnosed with incurable cancer. At the time, this disease was believed by many to be highly contagious, so there was a deep fear of contact with those suffering from this affliction. Lathrop soon found a special vocation to this work.

In the fall of 1896, after having taken a three-month nursing course at New York's Cancer Hospital, Lathrop moved into a three-room cold-water flat on New York City's impoverished Lower East Side and began to nurse the poor with incurable cancer. In March 1898 Alice Huber, having responded to an article Lathrop had written about her work, joined her in this service. Shortly afterwards Rose's husband George died. As others came to join them, Lathrop was inspired to found a religious congregation. One of her early supporters was Josephine Lazarus, sister of the poet Emma Lazarus who had been Rose's friend until her death from cancer.

== A new congregation ==
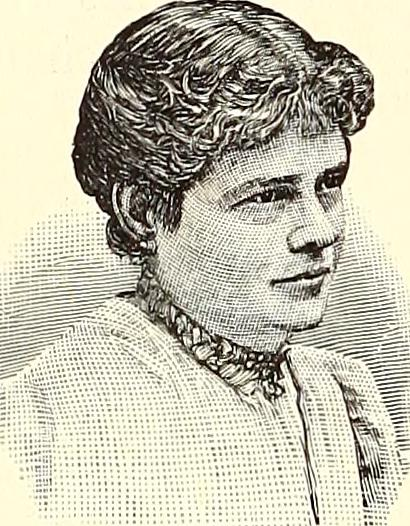
Rose Hawthorne Lathrop, also known as Mother Mary Alphonsa, circa 1882

The community became established as a congregation of Religious Sisters in 1900 and were given the Dominican habit. They termed themselves "the Servants of Relief for Incurable Cancer", and their purpose was to provide for the well-being of incurably ill and destitute cancer patients. Lathrop was elected as mother superior of the community and became known as Mother Mary Alphonsa.

The Sisters took only the most destitute, and provided them with all the care they needed, doing so without any form of compensation. In 1901 she established a nursing home in a small hamlet of Westchester County, some twenty miles north of New York City. Rosary Hill Home, as it was named, was formally opened to both male and female patients on June 5, 1901. Mother Mary Alphonsa lived at Rosary Hill for the rest of her life and rarely left, even declining an invitation from Harriett Lothrop to participate in a centennial celebration for her father at their former home The Wayside in Concord, Massachusetts.

The Sisters took a strict daily routine under Mother Mary Alphonsa, rising for prayers in the chapel at 4:30 in the morning before breakfast, then care for the sick and perform tasks like milking cows. The area around Rosary Hill later came to be called Hawthorne, New York, in honor of Lathrop's father.

The order founded a second home in 1912 at 71 Jackson Street in Manhattan. It was named St. Rose's Free Home for Incurable Cancer. Mother Alphonsa wanted a better environment for her charges than the bleak dirty streets of that part of Manhattan.

In 1930 the sisters opened the thirty-five bed skilled nursing facility, Sacred Heart Home in Philadelphia.

In 1939 the Dominicans opened Our Lady of Perpetual Help Home in Atlanta, Georgia.

In December 1941, the sisters opened Our Lady of Good Counsel Home in St. Paul, Minnesota. In 2009, the Sisters turned over operation of the home to the Franciscan Health Community, who continue to provide free care to those in need at end-of-life.

== Present situation ==
The order continues to refuse any payment from the patients or their families or from government funds from either Social Security or Medicare, nor do they accept money from private insurance.

By the end of the 20th century, like many other religious communities, the Dominican Sisters of Hawthorne were greatly reduced in numbers. In Fall 2002, the order closed the Rose Hawthorne Lathrop House in Fall River, Massachusetts. St. Rose's Home in Manhattan closed March 31, 2009. As of 2013 the order numbered fifty-three sisters. The Sisters continue to serve at Rosary Hill in New York and at homes in Philadelphia, and Atlanta.
