= George Parsons Lathrop =

American poet

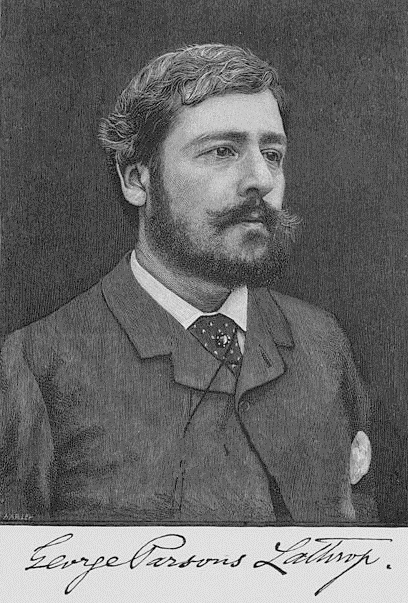
- Born: August 25, 1851; Honolulu, Hawaii
- Died: April 19, 1898 (aged 46); New York City, New York, U.S.
- Spouse: Rose Hawthorne (m.1871–98; his death)
- Children: 1
- Relatives: Francis Lathrop (brother)

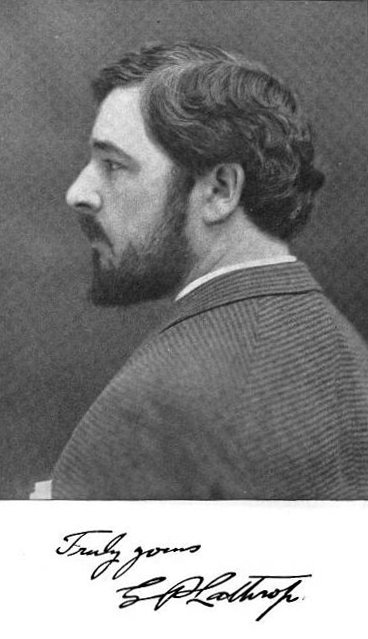

George Parsons Lathrop (August 25, 1851 – April 19, 1898) was an American poet, novelist, and newspaper editor.

Lathrop was known for pioneering copyright laws in the United States and the first international copyright law.

== Biography ==
=== Early life ===
George Lathrop was born August 25, 1851, in Honolulu, Hawaii. His father was medical doctor George Alfred Lathrop and his mother was Frances Maria (Smith) Lathrop. His brother was the painter Francis Lathrop.

George Parsons Lathrop attended Columbia Grammar School in New York City, then in 1867 was sent to study in Dresden in what was then the German Empire. It was in Dresden that he met Rose Hawthorne, the second daughter and youngest child of Nathaniel Hawthorne. After returning to New York in 1879, Lathrop entered Columbia College Law School. Finishing one term at Columbia, Lathrop practiced law in New York for a year. However, the need for more money prompted him to start a literary career. Lathrop soon left for London, marrying Rose in Chelsea on September 11, 1871. The couple then returned to the United States, settling in Cambridge, Massachusetts.

=== Literary career ===
In 1875, Lathrop became associate editor of the Atlantic Monthly in Washington, D.C, serving there for two years. The Lathrops' only child, Francis, was born during this period. George Lathrop became editor in 1879 of the Boston Courier in Boston. He published several books for the publisher Roberts Brothers in Boston, including Afterglow (1877) and Somebody Else (1878). He also edited A Masque of Poets, a book of poetry published in the Roberts Brothers "No Name" series.

In 1879, Lathrop purchased the Hawthorne home, called "The Wayside", in Concord, Massachusetts. In 1881, after the death of Francis, the couple went to Spain so that he could write articles for Harper's Monthly. He produced a work entitled "Spanish Vistas". The Lathrops returned to the United States in 1892. They decided to move to New York City again and sold their house in Concord. He became the literary editor for the New York Star. During this period, Lathrop created the play Elaine, based on the poem "Lancelot and Elaine" from Idylls of the King by Alfred, Lord Tennyson. The play was successfully staged at the Madison Square Theater in Manhattan and later toured in other American cities.

In 1883, Lathrop founded the American Copyright League, which assisted in securing an international copyright law. He and Rose moved to New London, Connecticut, in 1885. They converted to Catholicism in March 1891. He was a founder in 1892 of the Catholic Summer School of America in New London. In 1896, due to George Lathrop's alcohol abuse problem, the couple separated.

=== Death ===
George Lathrop died on April 19, 1898, at Roosevelt Hospital in Manhattan of kidney disease and heart disease with his brother Francis and former wife Rose at his side. After his death, Rose became a nun. Eventually called Mother Mary Alphonsa, she organized a community of Dominican tertiaries, the Dominican Sisters of Hawthorne, which operated two cancer hospitals in New York City.

== Selected works ==
- A Study of Hawthorne. James R. Osgood and Company. 1876.
- Spanish Vistas. Harper & brothers. 1883.
- "The Literary Movement in New York". Harper's New Monthly Magazine. 73 (438): 813–833. November 1886.
