= Sophia Hawthorne =

American artist (1809–1871)

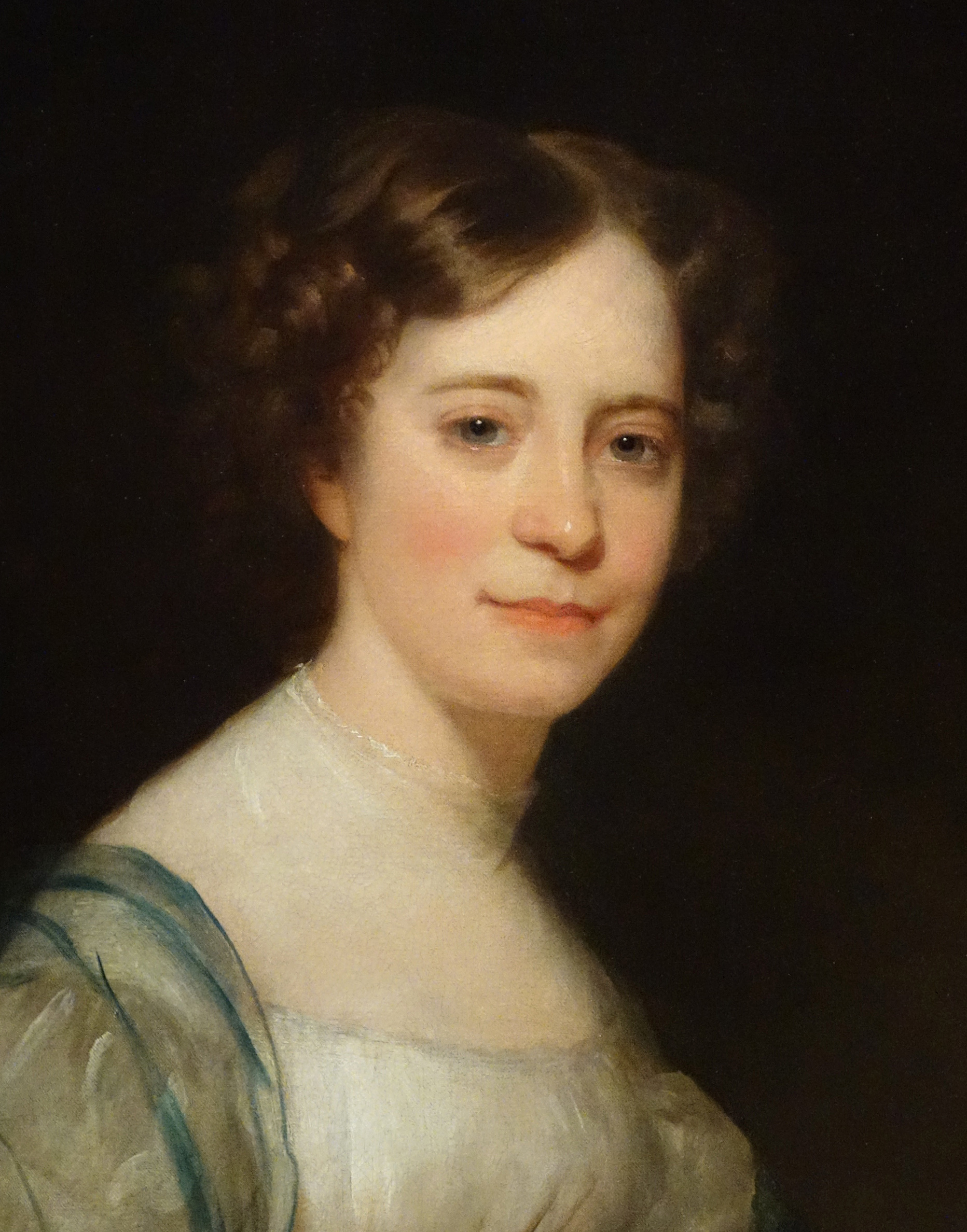
- 1830 portrait
- Born: Sophia Amelia Peabody; September 21, 1809; Salem, Massachusetts, US
- Died: February 26, 1871 (aged 61); London, England
- Occupations: Painter, illustrator, writer
- Spouse: Nathaniel Hawthorne (m. 1842; died 1864)
- Children: 3, including Julian Hawthorne, Rose Hawthorne Lathrop

Sophia Amelia Hawthorne (née Peabody; September 21, 1809 – February 26, 1871) was an American painter and illustrator and one of the first professional women artists in America. Her work was notably exhibited at the Boston Athenæum. Additionally, she published her journals and various articles. She was married to writer Nathaniel Hawthorne.

== Life ==
=== Early life ===
Sophia Amelia Peabody was born September 21, 1809, in Salem, Massachusetts, and named after two of her aunts. Peabody's father was the dentist Nathaniel Peabody, while her mother was the strong Unitarian Elizabeth Palmer. She had three brothers; her sisters were Elizabeth Palmer Peabody and Mary Tyler Peabody Mann, later Horace Mann's wife. Her sister Elizabeth educated Sophia, focusing on geography, science, literature and both American and European history; eventually, she learned to read in Latin, French, Greek and Hebrew; she knew some German, as well.

Sophia's health had been questionable since infancy, and she was an occasional invalid. One possible cause was a fashionable treatment her dentist father prescribed for her teething pains that included mercury. In later life, she was a frequent user of calomel and opium to relieve her pain and migraines. When doctors pronounced Sophia had no discernible illness, she sought the "rest therapy". She left for Cuba on December 4, 1833, with her sister Mary.

=== Courtship ===
Sophia first met Nathaniel Hawthorne through her sister, Elizabeth. When the author came to visit once, Elizabeth is said to have reported, "He is handsomer than Lord Byron!" When she urged Sophia to come downstairs to meet him, she laughed and said, "If he has come once he will come again". After meeting her, Nathaniel wrote the tale "Edward Randolph’s Portrait", which included an artist character inspired by Sophia Peabody named Alice Vane.

Sophia had originally objected to marriage, partly because of her health. They became secretly engaged by New Year's Day, 1839.

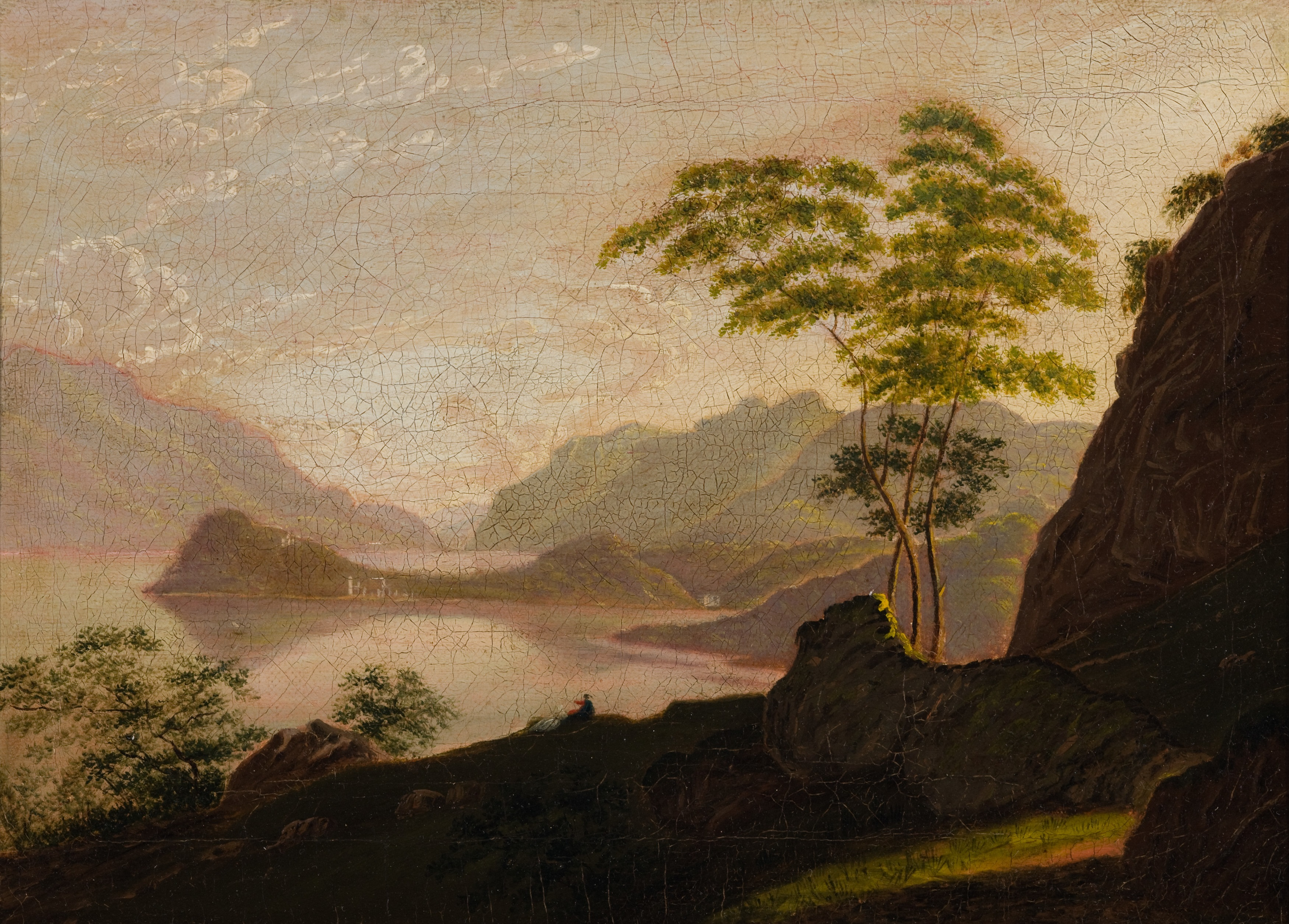
Villa Menaggio, Lago di Como by Sophia Peabody, 1839–40

Sophia gave two of her paintings to Hawthorne in 1840 on the first anniversary of their engagement. "Hawthorne valued the paintings so much that he hid them behind curtains to enjoy when he was alone".

=== Marriage and family ===
A wedding was scheduled for June 27, 1842, but was postponed when Sophia fell ill. On July 9, 1842, five years after first meeting, she and Nathaniel were married at 13 West Street in Boston, the Peabody bookstore where Margaret Fuller held some of her "conversations". The day before, Nathaniel wrote to James Freeman Clarke asking him to oversee the ceremony. "I am to be married to Miss Sophia Peabody tomorrow; and it is our mutual desire that you should perform the ceremony", he wrote. Both were considered relatively old for marriage (she was 32 and he was five days past his 38th birthday), but the coupling proved happy for both of them. Immediately after their wedding, they rented and moved into The Old Manse in Concord, Massachusetts. The next day, Hawthorne wrote to his sister, Louisa: "We are as happy as people can be, without making themselves ridiculous, and might be even happier; but, as a matter of taste, we choose to stop short at this point." Together the couple etched their impressions of their new married life in the glass of a window in the study using Sophia's diamond ring:

Man's accidents are God's purposes. Sophia A. Hawthorne 1843

Nath Hawthorne This is his study
The smallest twig leans clear against the sky
Composed by my wife and written with her diamond
Inscribed by my husband at sunset, April 3, 1843. In the Gold light.

SAH

On their first wedding anniversary, Nathaniel wrote to Sophia: "We were never so happy as now—never such wide capacity for happiness, yet overflowing with all that the day and every moment brings to us. Methinks this birth-day of our married life is like a cape, which we have now doubled and find a more infinite ocean of love stretching out before us."

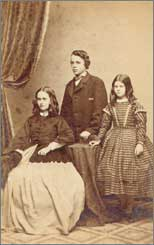
Photograph of Una, Julian and Rose Hawthorne c.1862

The Hawthornes' first child was born March 3, 1844, after a difficult 10-hour delivery. They named her Una, a reference to The Faerie Queene by Edmund Spenser, to the disapproval of many family members. Sophia wrote in her journal, "It was a great happiness to be able to put her to my breast immediately and I thanked Heaven I was able to have the privilege of nursing her." John L. O'Sullivan served as her godfather and gave her a Newfoundland dog named Leo when she was two months old. Nathaniel wrote that fatherhood brought "a very sober and serious kind of happiness", and the family began to worry about money. Sophia also had a recurrence of her migraines after Una's birth.

The family was soon kicked out of the Old Manse, left with only 10 dollars. They moved in with family on Herbert Street in Salem while Nathaniel awaited a government job appointment. In March, 1846, Sophia moved to 77 Carver Street in Boston to be closer to family and Dr. William Wesselhœft while pregnant with her second child. The couple's son Julian was born in Boston on May 22, 1846. His father wrote of the news to a sister, "A small troglodyte made his appearance here at ten minutes to six o'clock this morning, who claims to be your nephew".

The family moved to Lenox, Massachusetts, and it was there, in a red farmhouse they rented, that Sophia gave birth to her third child, Rose. Two months prior to giving birth, Sophia claimed she instinctively knew it would be a girl and chose the name Rose. She was born on May 20, 1851, about a month after the publication of The House of the Seven Gables. Sophia went into labor early, before the midwife could arrive; Rose was delivered with the help of Sophia's father.

Few of Sophia's letters from her courtship and early marriage survive. In June 1853, Nathaniel alludes to the destruction of his letters in his journal: "I burned great heaps of old letters and other papers, a little while ago, preparatory to going to England. Among them were hundreds of Sophia's maiden letters".

The Hawthornes raised their children in a positive environment and did not believe in harsh discipline or physical punishment. Hawthorne in 1862 praised his wife: "She is the most sensible woman I ever knew in my life, much superior to me in general talent, and of fine cultivation." Sophia had a close friendship with Annie Adams Fields, wife of the publisher James T. Fields. In 1863, Sophia wrote to her, "You embellish my life."

Nathaniel Hawthorne died in May 1864, and Sophia was given the news by her sister, Elizabeth Peabody, who had been informed by Franklin Pierce. Pierce, a close friend of Hawthorne, had been at the author's side when he died in his sleep. Sophia wrote about her husband's death to Annie Fields: "My darling has gone over that Sapphire sea, and these grand soft waves are messages from his Eternal Rest." She moved to England four years later in 1868 with her three children.

=== Later life, death, burial, and reburial ===
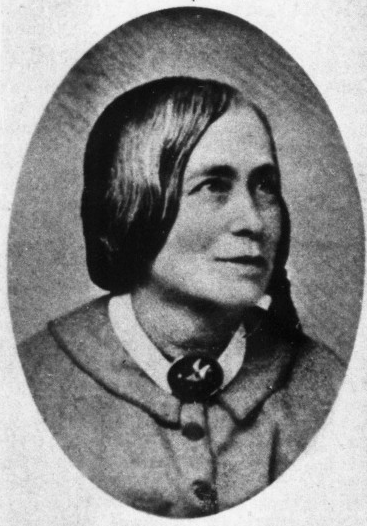
Portrait of Sophia Peabody Hawthorne

After her husband's death, Sophia threatened to sue publisher James T. Fields for not paying enough in royalties from book sales. Fields blamed his recently deceased business partner William Ticknor for promising "to pay the highest rate of copyright it ever paid" but that no written contract existed. The two agreed to a compromise as, Sophia said, she preferred "peace to pence".

Sophia became ill in February 1871, diagnosed with "typhoid pneumonia". She had difficulty breathing and was cared for by her daughters before dying on February 26. She was buried in Kensal Green Cemetery in London on March 4. Una wrote to Julian that their mother's grave was "on a sunny hillside looking towards the east... We had a head and footstone of white marble, with a place for flowers between, and Rose and I planted some ivy there that I had brought from America, and a periwinkle from papa's grave. The inscription is—Sophia, wife of Nathaniel Hawthorne."

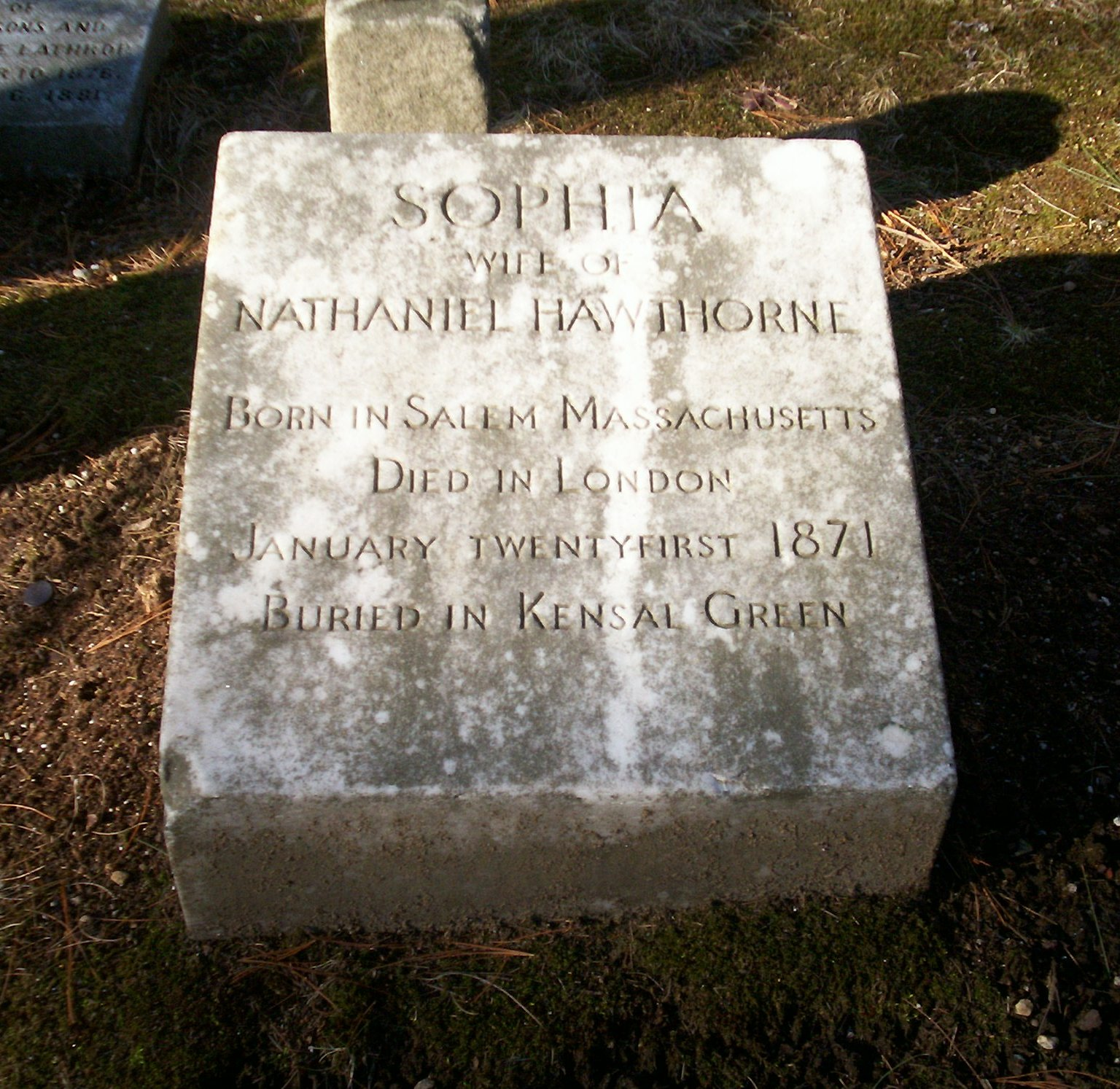
Grave of Sophia Hawthorne in Sleepy Hollow Cemetery

Una died in September 1877 at the age of 33 and was buried alongside her mother in Kensal Green. Julian Hawthorne went on to be a moderately successful author writing about his father and other miscellaneous works. He died in 1934. Rose went on to found the Roman Catholic order of nuns, the Dominican Sisters of Hawthorne, based in Hawthorne, New York, where she died in 1926.

Care for the graves of Sophia and Una fell to this organization. When the grave sites were in need of costly repair, it was suggested the remains be moved to the Hawthorne family plot in Concord, Massachusetts. In June, 2006 the two were re-buried alongside Nathaniel in Sleepy Hollow Cemetery. A funeral was held for the family's descendants with representatives from the Dominican Sisters, and a public ceremony was held at The Old Manse to mark the occasion.

== Artwork ==
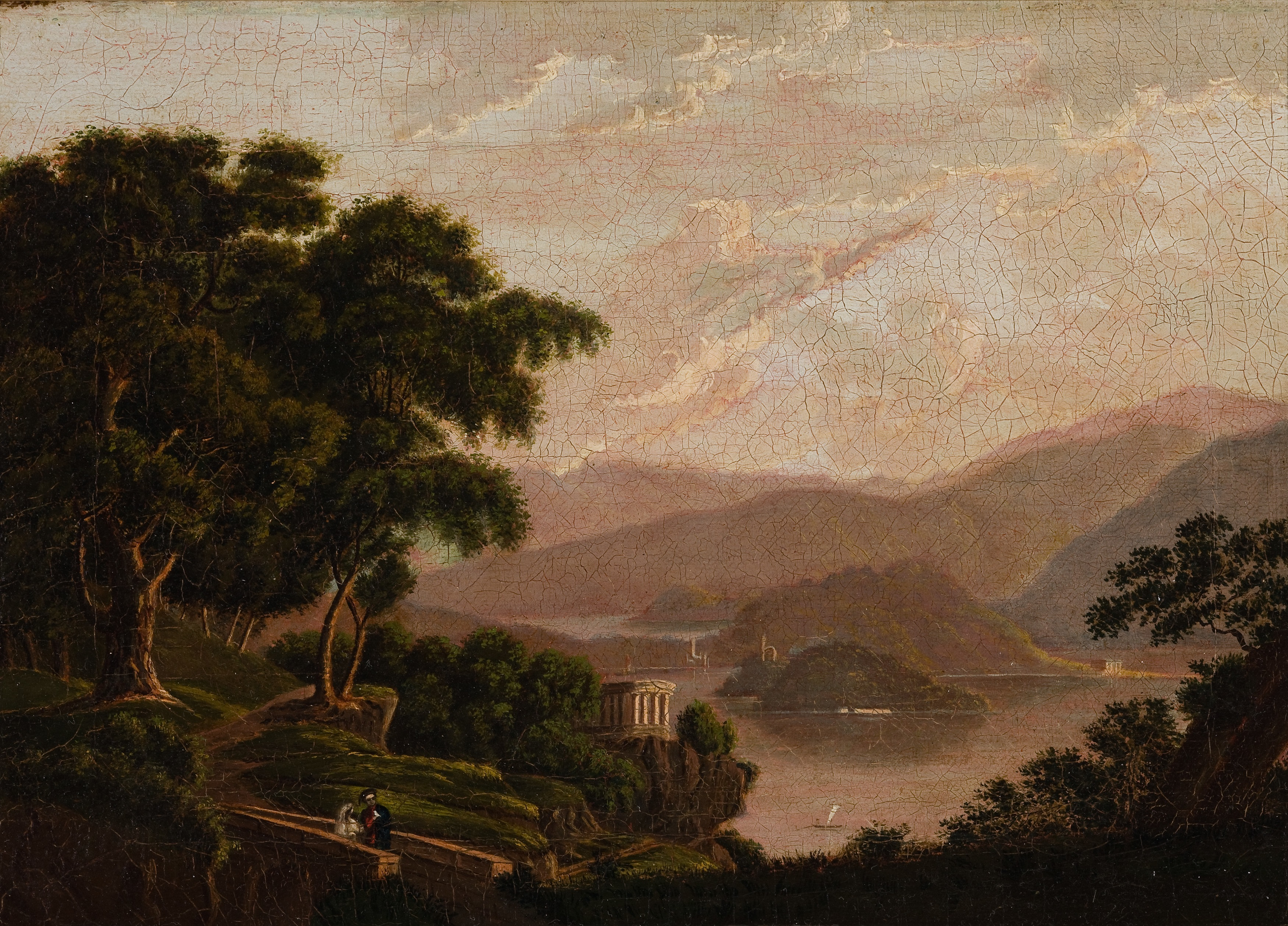
Isola San Giovanni by Sophia Peabody, 1839–40

Sophia Hawthorne was a writer and a painter. Sophia was one of America’s first professional women artists; her paintings were exhibited at the Boston Athenæum and she earned an income from her oil canvases, illustrations, decorative art, sculptures, and copies of the masters’ works.

Hawthorne's art began to evolve steadily after studying drawing in 1824; she further explored this discipline under the tutelage of Francis Graeter, the illustrator of Lydia Maria Child's Girl's Own Book. By 1832, Hawthorne was painting regularly—at first reproducing copies of existing artworks, and later executing landscapes of her own volition. In a letter to her sister Elizabeth in 1832, she wrote:

What do you think I have actually begun to do? Nothing less than create and do you wonder that I lay awake all last night after sketching my first picture. I actually thought my head would have made its final explosion. When once I began to excurse, I could not stop. Three distinct landscapes came forth in full array besides that which I had arranged before I went to bed and it seemed as if I should fly to be up and doing. I have always determined not to force the creative power but wait till it mastered me and now I feel as if the time had come and such freedom and revelry of spirit does it bring!

Sophia Hawthorne's artistic endeavors were hampered not only by the restrictive expectations placed upon women of the Victorian era, but also due to the objections of her husband who attempted to "colonize Sophia's talents, allowing her to hold the brush in order to paint his inner life rather than her own."

Sophia briefly studied sculpture with Shobal Vail Clevenger and produced a bas-relief medallion portrait of her dying brother George Peabody and, shortly thereafter, a similar work of Ralph Waldo Emerson's dead brother Charles. Later, she tutored her daughter Rose in art.

During their courtship, Sophia created an illustration for Nathaniel's tale "The Gentle Boy". After completing it, Sophia asked him if it looked like the main character, Ilbrahim. He answered, "He will never look otherwise to me". The story was republished with Sophia's illustration as The Gentle Boy: A Thrice Told Tale in December 1838, subsidized by a Salem hostess named Susan Burley. The book was dedicated to Sophia, inscribed: "To Miss Sophia A. Peabody, this little tale, to which her kindred art has given value, is respectfully inscribed by the author". When Nathaniel moved to Boston, Sophia painted two landscapes to decorate his apartment. On January 2, 1840, he wrote to her, "You cannot think how much delight those pictures are going to give me... I never owned a picture in my life." He later asked her to illustrate a reissue of his children's book Grandfather's Chair.
