= Catholic Summer School of America =

The Catholic Summer School of America originated at the end of the nineteenth century. A Catholic summer school is an assembly of Roman Catholics, both clergy and laity, held during the summer months. It aims to foster intellectual culture in harmony with Christian faith by means of lectures and special courses along university extension lines.

== History ==
It first took form in the Champlain Summer School which was founded at New London, Connecticut, 1892, and located more permanently in 1893 at Cliff Haven, New York. Of those who attended, reaching 10,000 annually, 75% were women. Bishop Henry Gabriels, of Ogdensburg, NY, former Rector of the Seminary of Troy, NY, was responsible for the growth and development of the Catholic Summer School at Cliff Haven near Plattsburgh, which was a strong influence in Catholic education for many years.

The Columbian Summer School was established at Madison, Wisconsin, 1895, and was more permanently located at Milwaukee; the Winter school of New Orleans was founded in 1896, and the Maryland Summer School in 1900.
