= Horatio Bridge =

United States Naval officer (1806–1893)

Commodore Horatio Bridge
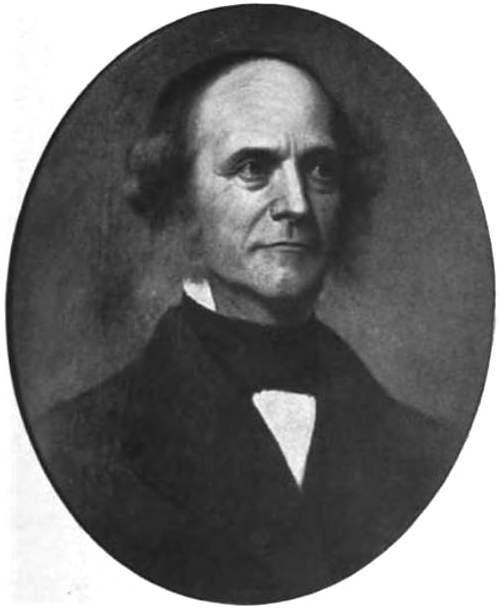
- After a portrait by Eastman Johnson
- Born: April 8, 1806; Augusta, Maine, U.S.
- Died: March March 18, 1893 (aged 86); Athens, Pennsylvania, U.S.
- Military career
- Allegiance: United States of America
- Branch: United States Navy
- Service years: 1838–1871
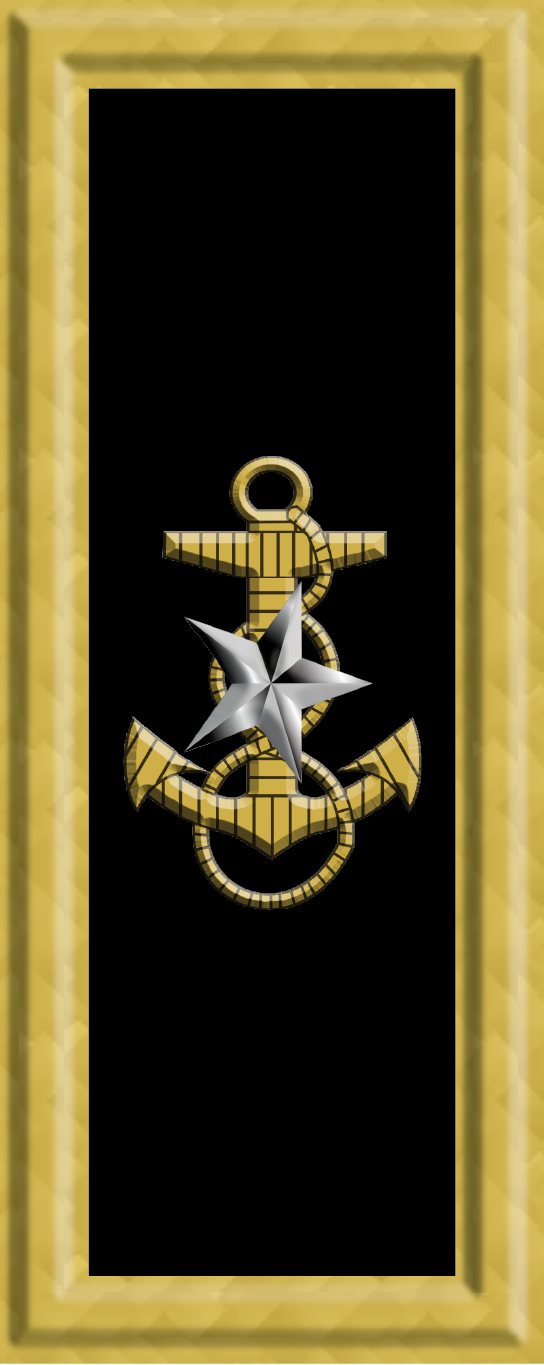
- Rank: Commodore
- Commands: Bureau of Provisions and Clothing
- Conflicts: American Civil War

Horatio Bridge (April 8, 1806 – March 18, 1893) was an officer of the United States Navy who, as Chief of the Bureau of Provisions, served for many years as head of the Navy's supply organization. Appointed by his former college mate, President Franklin Pierce, Bridge held this post under various administrations, including the whole period of the Civil War.

He also had the distinction of being the first man in the Navy to employ the idea of comprehensive fleet supply. Under his direction, the systematic supply of Navy vessels on the Atlantic and Gulf coasts during the Civil War was established and carried out with conspicuous success.

== Early life and education ==
The son of a judge, Bridge was born at Augusta, Maine. He received his early education in private schools and at Hallowell Academy. Bridge was graduated from Bowdoin College in the class of 1825, which included among its members Nathaniel Hawthorne and Henry Wadsworth Longfellow. According to a newspaper report in 1893, it was Bridge's appreciation of Hawthorne's early writings, and his faith in this man of genius, that, to use Hawthorne's own words, "was responsible for my being an author". One of his later books, The Snow-Image, and Other Twice-Told Tales, was dedicated to his friend and benefactor, Horatio Bridge.

The Commodore himself wielded a graceful pen, and besides contributions to periodicals was the author of The Journal of an African Cruiser, which was edited by Hawthorne, and Personal Recollections of Nathaniel Hawthorne.

== Legal and naval careers ==
After graduation from Bowdoin College, he studied law at Northampton Law School; was admitted to the bar, and practiced his profession at Augusta and Skowhegan (then Milburn), Maine. After ten years of practice, he found law distasteful to him and entered the U.S. Navy as a purser in 1838. After several long cruises in African, European, and Pacific waters, in 1854, he was called to Washington and appointed Chief of the Navy's Bureau of Provisions and Clothing.

He handled with great skill the responsible duties of this office. Of the skill and ability which he showed in its management, Senator James Grimes testified in a debate in 1865: "No Bureau of this government has been more admirably and accurately managed then the Bureau of Provisions and Clothing." To this, Senator John P. Hale, added; "I think a great reason, and a very important one, is because there is at the head of that Bureau an honest, vigilant, and faithful man".

During Bridge's tenure as head of the Bureau, he made many significant innovations in the Navy's supply system. Some of the more important ones were:

- Advertising for competitive bids became mandatory except for personal services, and except in the case of emergency.
- Preserved meats, pickles, butter, cheese, and desiccated vegetables could be bought without formal advertising and sealed bids.
- A requirement was written into the statutes which specified that "the Chief of the Bureau, also known as the Paymaster General, be appointed from the list of Paymasters of the Navy of not less than ten years standing". This meant that for the first time it was legally impossible for the Paymaster General to be a civilian.
- In 1862, the agitation against the rum ration became so pronounced that on September 1 of that year, it was finally eliminated and as a compensation, men's pay was raised five cents a day. It has been said that the Act was responsible for the origin of the old Navy song: "They raised our pay five cents a day, and took away our grog forever".

According to a Navy press notice, Bridge resigned his position as Chief of the Bureau in 1869. However, shortly thereafter he accepted the position as the first Chief Inspector of Clothing, which he held until the passage of the law debarring all Navy officers from active duty after reaching the age of sixty-two. He was detached from duty after serving afloat and ashore for fifty-five years.

== Family life ==
Commodore Bridge was married to Charlotte Marshall of Boston when he was forty years old. They had one daughter who died at the age of five. To appease his sorrow, his friend Hawthorne wrote him: "... I trust you will be able to feel that though it is good to have a dear child on earth, it is likewise good to have one safe in heaven. She will await you there and it will seem like home to you now. Affectionately, Nath". While he seldom visited his home town, he kept the affection and respect of his townspeople to a most unusual degree. His friends there remembered him as a remarkable old man, whose clear mind and strong memory would have done credit to a man in the prime of life. He was also noted for his military bearing and elastic step. Concerning his fine character, the Kennebec Journal said: "Commodore Bridge was a man of sterling principles and rugged honesty, with a strong mind and a warm heart; a gentleman of the old school in all that means, of broad culture and with a genial polished manner".

== Last years and legacy ==
Upon final retirement, on March 1, 1871, he went to his country home, "The Moorings", at Athens, Pennsylvania, where he spent the rest of his life. Here, according to The Athens News, he was an exemplary Christian and for many years had been an earnest and devout member of the Episcopal Church. Following Bridge's death in March 1893, he was buried in Athens.

Two US Navy ships have been named in his honor: USS Bridge (AF-1) and USS Bridge (AOE-10).
