= Langsdorf =

Langsdorf or Langsdorff may refer to:

- Karl Christian von Langsdorf (1757 – 1834), German mathematician, geologist, natural scientist and engineer
- Hans Langsdorff (1894 – 1939) was a German naval officer
- Danny Langsdorf (born 1972), American college football coach
- William B. Langsdorf (1909 – 2002), American educator, founding president of California State University, Fullerton
- Grigory Langsdorff (1774 – 1852), Prussian aristocrat, politician and naturalist
- Martyl Langsdorf (1917 – 2013), American artist, created Doomsday Clock illustration
- Alexander Langsdorf, Jr. (1912 – 1996), American physicist, helped found Bulletin of the Atomic Scientists, Szilárd petition signatory

== See also ==
- Langsdorff's toucanet; see golden-collared toucanet
- Langdorf
