= Falzone =

Falzone is an Italian surname. Notable people with the surname include:

- Diana Falzone, American reporter
- Joseph Falzone (1900–1984), American lawyer and politician
- Lisa Falzone, American businesswoman
- Mark Falzone (born 1975), American politician
