= Joseph Falzone =

American politician and lawyer

Joseph A. Falzone (March 23, 1900 - March 1, 1984) was an American Republican politician and lawyer who has served in the Missouri General Assembly. He was first elected to the Missouri House of Representatives in 1934 and first elected to the Missouri Senate in 1940.

Born in St. Louis, Missouri, Falzone was educated at University City public schools and Saint Louis University. He was admitted to the bar in 1924 and practiced law in Clayton, Missouri. During World War I, he served with 52nd Aero Squadron.

In 1943, Falzone along with Martyl Langsdorf, wife of Alexander Langsdorf Jr., introduced a bill which was enacted by the Missouri State Legislature calling upon President Roosevelt, Secretary of State Hull, and the United States Congress to use their influence with the United Nations to secure the establishment of a Jewish Commonwealth in Palestine as part of a peace settlement.

In 1945, Senator Falzone was charged by a special panel of senators with soliciting a $1,500 bribe. Proceedings were initiated for Falzone to be expelled from the senate with his trial beginning October 29, 1945, but he decided to resign from the legislature on November 1, 1945.
