= Third Unitarian Church =

Church building in Chicago, US

Coordinates: 41.8859°N 87.7716°W

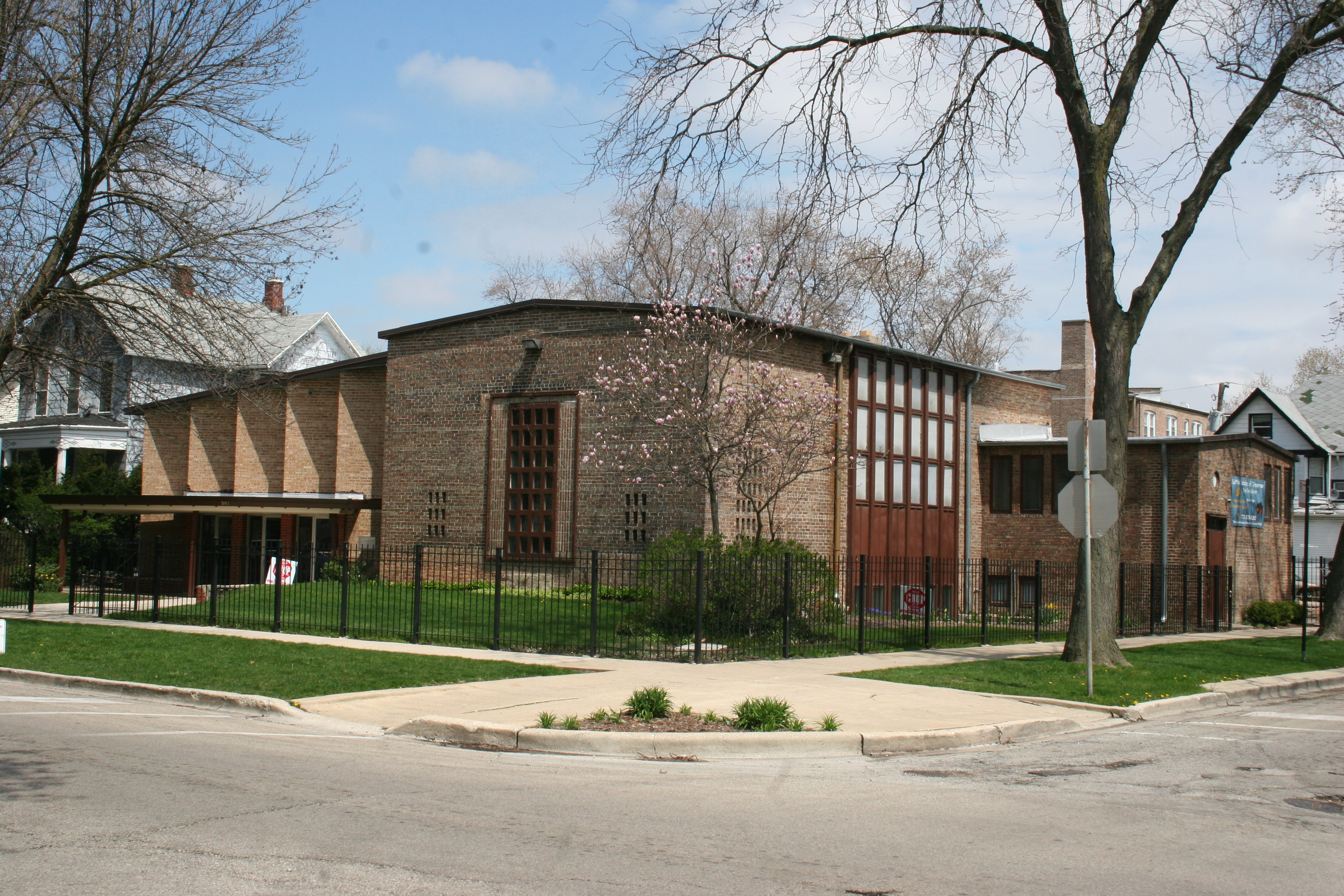
Third Unitarian Church at 301 N. Mayfield Ave

The Third Unitarian Church (TUC) is a Unitarian Universalist church in the West Side of Chicago, Illinois, United States. It was founded in November 1868. Because of its pioneering architecture for its day, it has become much of a landmark in Chicago, and is now an official landmark. The church is liberal and describes itself as "a progressive, welcoming, and diverse congregation".

== History ==
The church was founded in November 1868 by a few practitioners of this religion interested in having a Unitarian church in what was then referred to as Chicago's "West Division". They placed an ad in the newspaper calling on others that shared this interest to join them in worship. The minister presiding over these early services was Carlton A. Staples and the congregation originally met at Martine Hall, on Ada Street near Madison.

Staples was officially installed as the first pastor of TUC in June 1869. This significant event included the "extension of fellowship" from Charles Lowe of Boston, on behalf of the American Unitarian Association. The sermon was given by then president of Antioch College, George Washington Hosmer.

The church flourished during Staples' time there. The congregation quickly grew to over 100 families, and plans were started for a building dedicated specifically to TUC. The congregation bought land at the corner of Laflin and Monroe Streets. The land was purchased for $13,000 and, according to the Chicago Tribune, was “bought on long time and low interest.” This meant the chief initial financial concern was getting the church built. Services and church-related activities were already being held in the above-ground basement of the building before the upper floors were even completed. Construction was slowed by the Great Chicago Fire of 1871, which devastated the businesses of many of the more wealthy congregants. Not only did this reduce the support necessary to continue building, but during this time, the basement was opened up to those displaced by the fire. Nonetheless, the new church was officially dedicated in early 1872.

Staples resigned in November 1872 to accept a call to lead a Unitarian church in Providence, Rhode Island. In September 1873 the second minister of Third Unitarian Church, Minot Judson Savage, preached his first sermon. January 1875 marked the coming of the third minister, Edwin P. Powell.

Regarding Powell's tenure, the Chicago Tribune reported, "Under his management, the church has been noted as being the most radical in the city, and Dr. Powell has enjoyed considerable of a reputation abroad for his outspoken sermons." Though the church resolved its floating debt during this period, financial woes loomed.

The church was dormant on and off from mid-1877 through 1880 due to financial issues. Other Chicago Unitarian ministers—Robert Collyer, Brooke Herford, and Trowbridge Brigham Forbush—held a service at the church. In addition to rallying the congregation, the hope was to take stock of the financial predicament. Forbush noted a debt of $14,500. The American Unitarian Association had agreed to donate $5,000, provided the church would reduce the debt to $7,000 by borrowing against the church property.

The Chicago Tribune characterized Forbush's comments this way: "The church was now without a shepherd, but if more sacrifices were not made it was barely possible that the members of the Society would find themselves not only without a shepherd but without a fold. In conclusion, he urged upon his hearers the necessity for again taking hold of the project to revive the church and place it in the position which it ought to occupy in this city." Forbush went on to say, "The church could be brought out of its troubles by giving, by faith, by prayer, by courage."

One unnamed Unitarian who wrote a response to this plea in a letter to the editor said, "Potatoes are made to grow by putting them into the ground, and then, after tilling. This planting and tilling is called work. This is the only way potatoes ever were known to be produced, and by the same natural process church debts are paid. Faith, prayer, and courage never yet grew a potato or paid a church debt, and it never will."

After several difficult years, a new pastor, Edward Illsley Galvin, took over the reorganization of Third Unitarian Church in early 1880. In 1883, Galvin was succeeded by James Vila Blake, who would preside over the congregation for about 15 years.

=== Church fire of 1896 ===
Just as congregants settled in for the 11:00 a.m. service October 25, 1896, a fire broke out on the lower level. A Sunday school teacher alerted Blake who was still in his office. Blake calmly entered the pulpit and asked, "My friends, I have a request to make of you. I want you all to go quietly out the rear way. There is no danger, and no occasion for haste, but I would like to have you move out quickly and without confusion." This level-headed response prompted the headline—"Pastor Saves His Flock"—in the next day's Chicago Tribune.

There was enough time to clear the pastor's office of important books and manuscripts, but most everything else was lost. The fire was out by 12:30 p.m., but because it was a frame structure, it went fast. The Tribune reported, "A small tower on the southeastern corner of the edifice alone remains intact. All else is either destroyed or charred beyond avail." Insurance on the building was $8,000 and another $3,000 on the organ, which was one of the first in a Chicago church. After the fire, services continued at Lewis Institute at Madison and Robey Streets.

While Blake saved the congregation, he wasn't growing it at a rate many church members found adequate. In September 1897 Blake resigned. The congregation called Franklin Chester Southworth Sr. as an interim minister.

=== Rebuilding the church ===
A ceremony was held in November 1897 to lay the cornerstone of the to-be-built Third Unitarian Church at 3215 W. Monroe Street, near Kedzie.

=== A new building ===
In 1936 an acceptable site was found. At the time of its inception, the architecture planned for the church, designed by Paul Schweikher, was unorthodox and pioneering for its day. After the building's construction, an addition was added in 1956. The building was officially declared a landmark by Chicago's city council in 1960.

=== The Andrene Kauffman murals ===
Between 1955 and 1963, Chicago artist and church member, Andrene Kauffman designed seventeen ceramic portrait murals for the church, as well as a stained glass window which dominates the south wall. The murals were inspired by a sermon by Edwin T. Buehrer on the "Saints of Liberalism" and include portraits of Jane Addams, Susan B. Anthony, Buddha, Albert Camus, William E. Channing, Ralph Waldo Emerson, Gandhi, Goethe, Thomas Jefferson, Jesus, Abraham Lincoln, Socrates, Roger Williams, and Woodrow Wilson, among others.

== Past ministers (including a few highlights from their ministries) ==
1868–1872: Carlton A. Staples. Excerpt from sermon:

Oh, my friends, how easy it is to give ourselves up to one idea, or principle, or teacher, and run on the narrow track of his thought. To say I am a conservative, and then shout, and vote, and pray for whatsoever is conservative, right or wrong. To say, I am a radical, and then shut your eyes on everything not bearing the radical mark; condemning everything and fighting it with relentless bitterness which does not square exactly with the radical rule. To say I am a Parker man, or a Channing man, and then try to walk in his ways, and see with his eyes, and be a mere echo of his opinions. This is servility and narrowness, and intolerance, and slavery. God asks none of these things of us; but to be our selves, to listen with our own ears for His voice, and search with our own eyes for His truths, and reach out in trustful love, and earnest faith, and untiring toil for His goodness. To be men and women in the spirit of Jesus Christ.

1873-1874: Minot Judson Savage.

1875-1877: Edward Payson Powell.

1877-1880: Robert Collyer, Brooke Herford, and Trowbridge Brigham Forbush held services during this time.

1880-1881: Edward Illsley Galvin.

1882-1883: W. H. Cowl.

1883-1897: James Vila Blake.

1898-1899: Franklin Chester Southworth.

1900-1904: Wilson Marvin Backus.

1904-1908: Fred Alban Well.

1907-1910: George B. Foster

1911-1921: Rowena Morse Mann.

1922-1923: A. Wakefield Williams.

1924-1928: David Rhys Williams.

1928-1932: Walton Elbert Cole.

1932-1941: Edwin H. Wilson. During Wilson's ministry, the church constructed a new building (as described above).

1941-1969: Edwin T. Buehrer. During Buehrer's ministry, the congregation grew. An expansion of the building as designed by William Fyfe was completed in 1956 (as described above). During Buehrer's ministry, Andrene Kauffman created several murals for the sanctuary (as described above). In 1965 Pageant Press published Rev. Buehrer's "The Changing Climate of Religion: Humanist Sermon-Essays." In 1971, the 129-page book The Art of Being by Edwin T. Buehrer (1894-1969) was published as an all-church project by the Third Unitarian Church. The book consists of excerpts from addresses delivered by E.T (as he was known) during his 28 years of ministry at TUC. The excerpts illustrate the basic tenets of his faith, his appreciation of his fellow human beings, and his concern for their welfare. Dana McLean Greeley, Past President of the Unitarian Universalist Association of America, said of E. T.: “His rationalism, his mysticism, and his pragmatism were mixed in him in perfect balance.”

1969-1974: Donald H. Wheat. (See entry for 1984-1996)

1975-1981: Donald H. Wheat. (See entry for 1984-1996)

1980-1981: Graylon Hagler. Associate Minister.

1982-1983: Gene Kreves.

1984-1996: Donald H. Wheat. Wheat was the minister of Third Unitarian Church of Chicago from 1969 with brief stints elsewhere until his 1996 retirement. Among the activities during his ministry, the congregation began a food pantry, a scholarship fund for local high schools, etc. His 260-page book Why Not Me? Finessing Life's Slings and Arrows was published in 2020. It includes a collection of 40 essays. Taken together, the essays offer guidance on how to live a moral, fulfilled, meaningful, and often happy life in an indifferent universe.

1997-1998: Various interim ministers.

1998-2002: Michelle W. Bentley.

2003-2014: Brian Covell. During Covell's ministry, the church building received much needed maintenance, including building tuckpointing and repair of the mounting of the Kaufman murals. He brought an energy to the church that attracted many new members. A community garden for member and neighbor use was begun. The strangest incident during his ministry was when Norman Porter, a prison escapee living under the alias "J. J. Jameson" was arrested in 2005.

2014-2017: Various interim ministers.

2017–present: Colleen Vahey. Vahey began as our minister in August 2017. Over the past 25 years she has served as a hospital chaplain, religious educator, assistant minister, and college lecturer. Vahey brought a ministry of pastoral sensitivity, social activism, and personal outreach that attracted new members in a time of renewed racial justice activism.
