= James Vila Blake =

American Unitarian minister, poet, and hymn writer (1842–1925)

Rev. Dr. James Vila Blake
- Born: January 21, 1842; Brooklyn, NY
- Died: April 28, 1925 (aged 83); Chicago, IL
- Education: Harvard
- Occupations: Unitarian minister, and writer
- Known for: Hymns, poems, essays and plays
- Notable work: Unity Hymns and Chorals for the Congregation and the Home

James Vila Blake (1842–1925) was an American Unitarian minister, essayist, playwright, poet, and hymn writer. He was associated with the Western-based radical wing of the Unitarian church.

== Biography ==
Blake was born in Brooklyn, New York on January 21, 1842. He graduated from Harvard College in 1862, and from Harvard Divinity School in 1866.

He served as pastor in several Unitarian churches in Massachusetts and Illinois. Different sources give different, and inconsistent, dates for his pastorates, but the basic chronology is the following:

- 1867–69 - First Parish Church, Haverhill, Massachusetts
- 1869–71 - Twenty-Eighth Congregational Society, Boston
- 1877–84 - Quincy, Illinois
- 1877–96 - Quincy, Illinois
- 1883–97 - Third Unitarian Church, Chicago
- 1892–1916 - Evanston, Illinois

After the Haymarket Square bombing in Chicago in 1886, Blake joined with fellow Unitarian radicals Jenkin Lloyd Jones and William Mackintire Salter in striving to save the lives of the convicted anarchists. Historian Allen Ruff writes, "A meeting at the Third Unitarian to protest the death penalty and insist that the [Haymarket] trial had been unjust and unfair 'brought down violent opposition and condemnation upon the head of its pastor', James Vila Blake."

A decade later, Blake was celebrated for heroism. A news report from October 1896 said he exhibited cool presence of mind when a fire broke out during a service. He was the last to leave the church, which by that time was full of smoke. Seconds later, the building burst into flames and was consumed.

Blake produced over 20 volumes of poems, sermons, essays, plays, and hymns. Many of his books were published by the radical Chicago-based firm, Charles H. Kerr & Co. Blake collaborated with Frederick Lucian Hosmer and William Channing Gannett in the compilation and editing of Unity Hymns and Chorals for the Congregation and the Home (1880), a popular hymnbook—which included several of Blake's hymns—that circulated widely and was reprinted multiple times.

James Blake died in Chicago on April 28, 1925.

== Legacy ==
While pastor at Evanston, Blake penned a Covenant that has been adopted by many Unitarian Congregations:

Love is the spirit of this church,
and service is its law.
This is our great covenant:
To dwell together in peace,
to seek the truth in love,
and to help one another.

Some of Blake's poems were set to music by English composer John Ireland (1879–1962).

== Publications ==
- Unity, Songs and Services for the Sunday School. Western Unitarian Sunday School Society. 1881. OCLC 917914037.
- Manual Training in Education. Charles H. Kerr & Co. 1886. OCLC 18421039.
- Poems. Charles H. Kerr & Co. 1887. OCLC 8121276.
- Essays. Charles H. Kerr & Co. 1887. OCLC 6933505.
- Legends from Story-Land. Charles H. Kerr & Co. 1888.
- A Grateful Spirit and Other Sermons. Charles H. Kerr & Co. 1890.
- St. Solifer with Other Worthies and Unworthies. Charles H. Kerr & Co. 1891. OCLC 5937252.
- Happiness from Thoughts and Other Sermons. Charles H. Kerr & Co. 1891. LCCN tmp96029024.
- Natural Religion in Sermons. 1892. LCCN unk82071181.
- Unity Hymns and Chorals for the Congregation and the Home. Charles H. Kerr & Co. 1892 [1880]. Co-edited with William C. Gannett and Frederick L. Hosmer.
- More Than Kin: A Book of Kindness. Charles H. Kerr & Co. 1893. OCLC 20139823.
- Sermons of Religion and Life. Charles H. Kerr & Co. 1893. OCLC 1107830. Co-edited with Henry Doty Maxson and Henry Martyn Simmons.
- An Anchor of the Soul: A Study of the Nature of Faith. Charles H. Kerr & Co. 1894. LCCN 45040052.
- Farther on: Five Life-Studies. James H. West. 1897. LCCN 20017799. Co-written with E. H. Chapin, Minot J. Savage, W. L. Sheldon, and Philip S. Thatcher.
- Sonnets. 1898. OCLC 7722944.
- Unity Hymns and Chorals for the Congregation and the Home. Charles H. Kerr & Co. 1899 [1880]. Co-edited with William C. Gannett and Frederick L. Hosmer.
- Songs. Boston, J. H. West Co. 1902. OCLC 4057681.
- Discoveries. Thomas P. Halpin. 1904. OCLC 8403420.
- The Months: A Book of Those Handsome Kin, for Love of Them All, and of Life, and of the Earth. J. H. West Company. 1907. OCLC 20612605.
- So Like Her Father: A Drama, in a Prelude and Three Acts. 1909. OCLC 894153286.
- A Merry-go-round: A Comedy in Four Acts. Thomas P. Halpin. 1910. OCLC 20679834.
- A Play in Four Acts; The Lady Bertha's Honey-Broth, Founded on Dumas' Story of the Same Name. The Pryor Press. 1911. OCLC 20623547.
- Sonnets from Marcus Aurelius. Thomas P. Halpin. 1920. OCLC 3416005.
