= Paul Schweikher House and Studio =

Historic house in Schaumburg, Illinois

- U.S. National Register of Historic Places
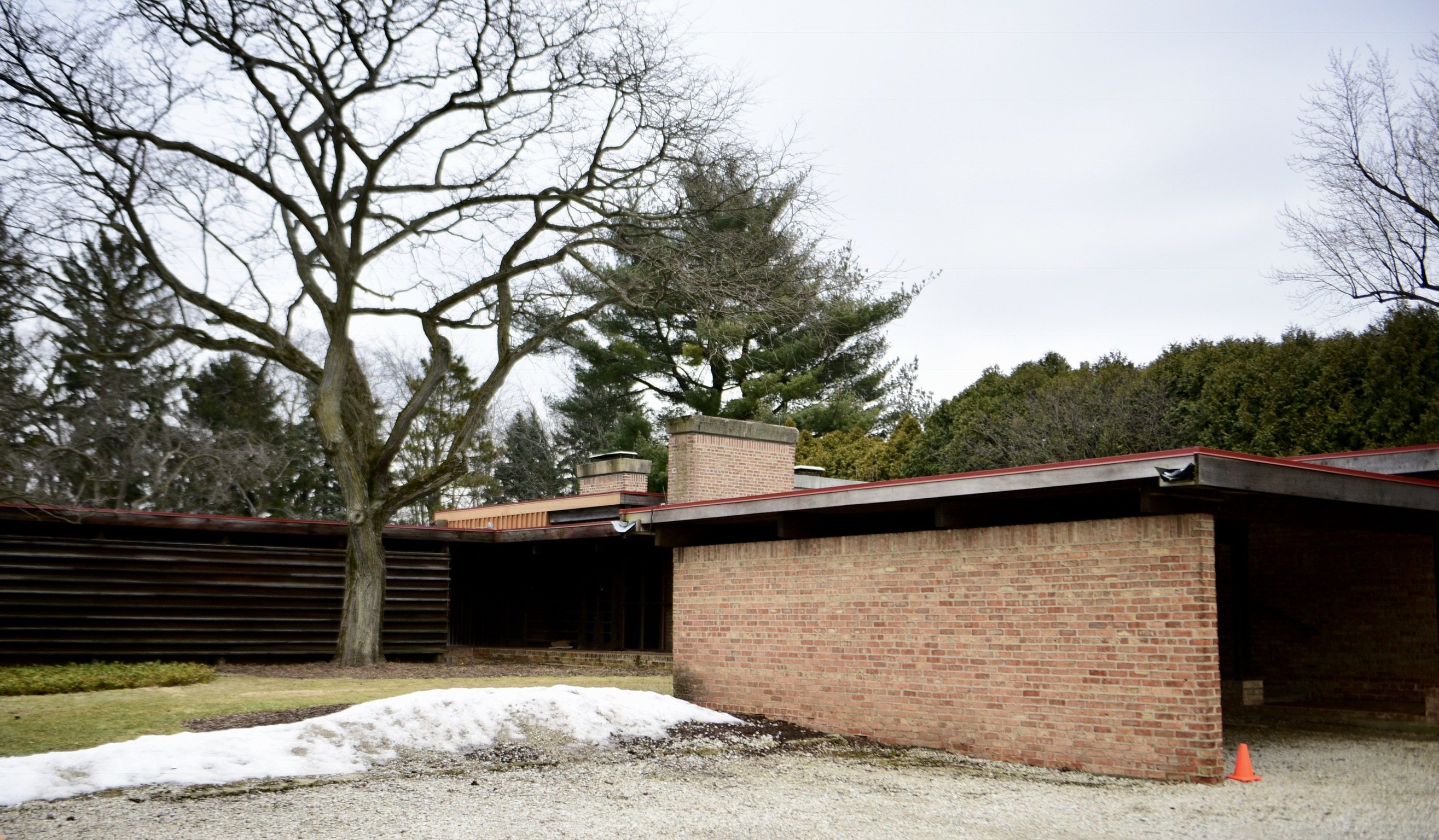
- Interactive map of Paul Schweikher House and Studio
- Location: 645 S. Meacham Rd., Schaumburg, Illinois
- Coordinates: 42°01′01″N 88°02′37″W
- Area: 2.5 acres (1.0 ha)
- Built: 1937–38
- Architect: Paul Schweikher
- Architectural style: Prairie School, International Style
- NRHP reference No.: 87000098
- Added to NRHP: February 17, 1987

The Paul Schweikher House and Studio is a residence at 645 S. Meacham Road in Schaumburg, Illinois, United States. Designed by the architect Paul Schweikher, the building consists of two detached structures, Schweikher's house and his architectural workshop, connected by a breezeway. The design blends several of the styles in which Schweikher worked throughout his career, including the Prairie School style and International, Japanese, and American vernacular influences. The structures are listed on the National Register of Historic Places.

Schweikher obtained the land, which was then part of the village of Roselle, in either 1936 or 1937. Schweikher completed the home in 1938, and it was his residence for 15 years. During his occupancy, Schweikher designed many of his buildings in the studio, and the building was known as "South Willow". In 1953, he sold the building to the nuclear physicist Alexander Langsdorf and his wife, the landscape artist Martyl Langsdorf, who owned the building for several decades. The Metropolitan Water Reclamation District of Greater Chicago seized the house through eminent domain in the late 1980s, while the Langsdorfs continued to live there. In 1999, the village of Schaumburg acquired the house, with plans to renovate it. After Martyl Langdorf's death in 2013, the village began to convert the house into a museum.

The one-story house and two-story studio were built out of wood, brick, and glass. The simple materials and low roof helped match the house to its natural environment, a landscape designed by Franz Lipp. The inside of the T-shaped house is divided into sleeping, working, and living areas, with decorative details such as open shelves and brick walls. The house and studio originally had three bedrooms, though another bedroom was later created from Schweikher's personal office. The building is illuminated by natural light and recessed lights, and it uses several heating systems. The home's design was praised by contemporary architects, including Ralph Rapson, William Metcalf, and Bertrand Goldberg.

== History ==
The structures were built as the residence and studio of the architect Paul Schweikher (1903–1997). Originally hailing from Denver, Schweikher achieved prominence through a 1933 exhibition at the Museum of Modern Art, working in partnership with Winston Elting. He lived in what is now Schaumburg (until 1956 part of the village of Roselle), in the Chicago metropolitan area, from 1934 to 1953. Later in his life, he became the chairman of both the Carnegie Mellon School of Architecture and the Yale School of Architecture.

=== Schweikher ownership ===
In 1936 or 1937, Schweikher obtained land in Roselle. The site was variously cited as covering 7 acres (2.8 ha) or 7 1/4 acres (2.9 ha). In exchange, Schweikher agreed to redesign a barn nearby for the person who had given him the land. At the time, he had won a cash prize from General Electric for his design of a modernistic industrial building, giving him enough money to build a house of his own. The site was rural at the time; it was 27 miles (43 km) west of Chicago, and the nearest town was 7 miles (11 km) away.

Schweikher drew up the first plans for the house while traveling back to the U.S. from Japan. He had been staying at Frank Lloyd Wright's Imperial Hotel, Tokyo. The design of the house incorporated many of the Japanese design features Schweikher had seen in Japan, such as lamps, a Japanese bathtub, and sliding doors. When Schweikher completed the home in 1938, it included a small studio that was intended to be used whenever Schweikher had to work on a project at a late hour. The house, which Schweikher referred to as "South Willow", was his residence for 15 years. The building's studio was not meant to be Schweikher's main workplace, as he worked primarily in Chicago, but both Schweikher and Elting were enlisted in the United States Armed Forces during World War II. After the war returned, the partners were unable to find space for their architectural practice in Chicago, so they instead worked at Schweikher's home studio.

Schweikher designed many of his buildings in the studio. Architects such as Wright and Ludwig Mies van der Rohe visited the house while Schweikher lived there. In addition, other architects such as Bertrand Goldberg and Edward D. Dart were trained there. Not long after Schweikher's son was born in 1945, the architect added a conference room to the studio. Schweikher also added a bedroom to the house in 1946 or 1948. In the years after Schweikher completed his house and studio, his firm's designs were featured in numerous architectural exhibitions and magazines. The architect William Bruder wrote that the house and studio were "the pivotal architectural work which established both the philosophy and career of" Schweikher.

=== Langsdorf and Water District ownership ===
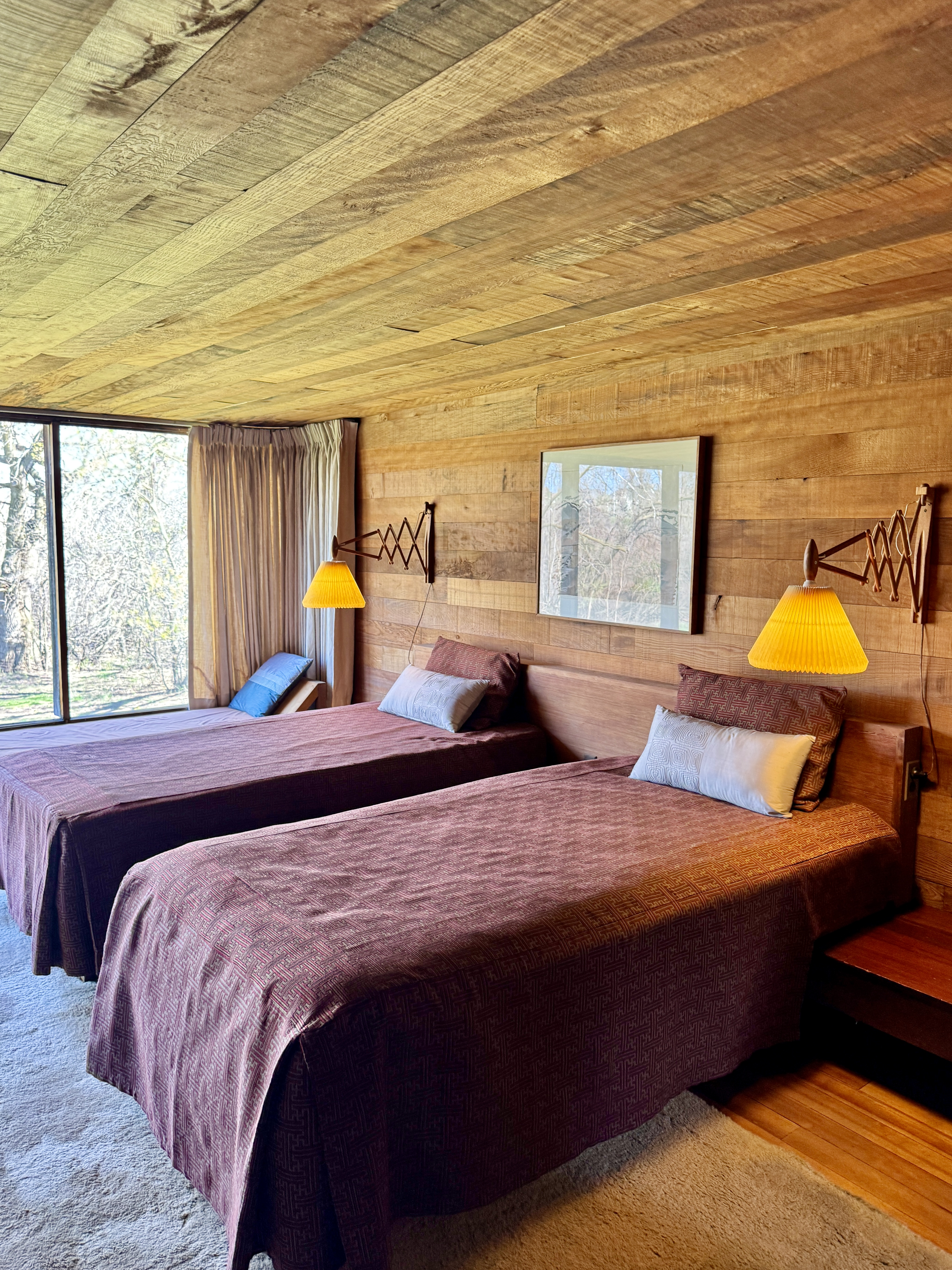
The master bedroom

In 1953, Schweikher accepted a position as the chairman of Yale University's School of Architecture. He sold the house to the nuclear physicist Alexander Langsdorf and his wife, the landscape artist Martyl Langsdorf. The Langsdorfs and their two daughters became the house's second residents; the family continued to own the building for several decades, decorating the house with furniture from Schweikher and Eero Saarinen. The family also hosted parties in the house, inviting some of their friends who had won Nobel Prizes. In a Daily Herald interview, Martyl said she did not have a favorite room in the house, saying that "each room is unique". For the rest of Schweikher's life, the Langsdorfs consulted him whenever they wanted to make changes to the design.

The Metropolitan Water Reclamation District of Greater Chicago began buying up the surrounding land in the 1970s. Another development, a condominium apartment building, was built on the grounds of the Schweikher House in the early 1980s. The house was added to the National Register of Historic Places (NRHP) on February 17, 1987, becoming the only NRHP-listed building in the village of Schaumburg. Although NRHP listings were typically required to be at least 50 years old, the 48-year-old Schweikher House and Studio was given a waiver to this rule. The Langsdorfs were concerned about the rapid growth of the Chicagoland suburbs, and the building were surrounded by land owned by the Metropolitan Water Reclamation District. This designation did not give the house and studio any legal protections, allowing a future owner to destroy it.

The Metropolitan Water Reclamation District acquired the Schweikher House and Studio itself in either 1987 or 1988, seizing the land through eminent domain. The district's lawyers claimed that they needed the land to expand a nearby sewage plant, while other figures, including an Art Institute of Chicago curator and one of Schaumburg's former mayors, advocated for its preservation. A court approved the land seizure while ruling that the Langsdorfs could continue to live in the house for the rest of their life. The district was also compelled to make repairs to the house as necessary. The house remained a private residence and was rarely opened for public tours, though the public could visit the house on occasion. Alexander Langsdorf lived into the house until his death in 1996.

In 1997, the village's Olde Schaumburg Centre Commission recommended designating the Schweikher House and Studio as a municipal landmark, following six years of studies on whether to grant landmark protections to various buildings in the village. The water district opposed the designation, as it wanted to demolish the Schweikher House and Studio to make way for the sewage plant expansion, and the district wanted to demolish it after Martyl Langsdorf died or moved away. The disputes over the building's proposed demolition led to Landmarks Preservation Council of Illinois to list it as one of Illinois's 10 most endangered historic sites in 1998. Martyl opposed the proposed demolition, saying that "it's an absolute act of vandalism to tear it down". Martyl also considered repurchasing the house, and Schaumburg village officials also expressed interest in preserving the house. The house and studio were designated as Schaumburg municipal landmarks in December 1998, and Martyl agreed to allow the village to install a historical marker outside the building.

=== Schaumburg ownership ===
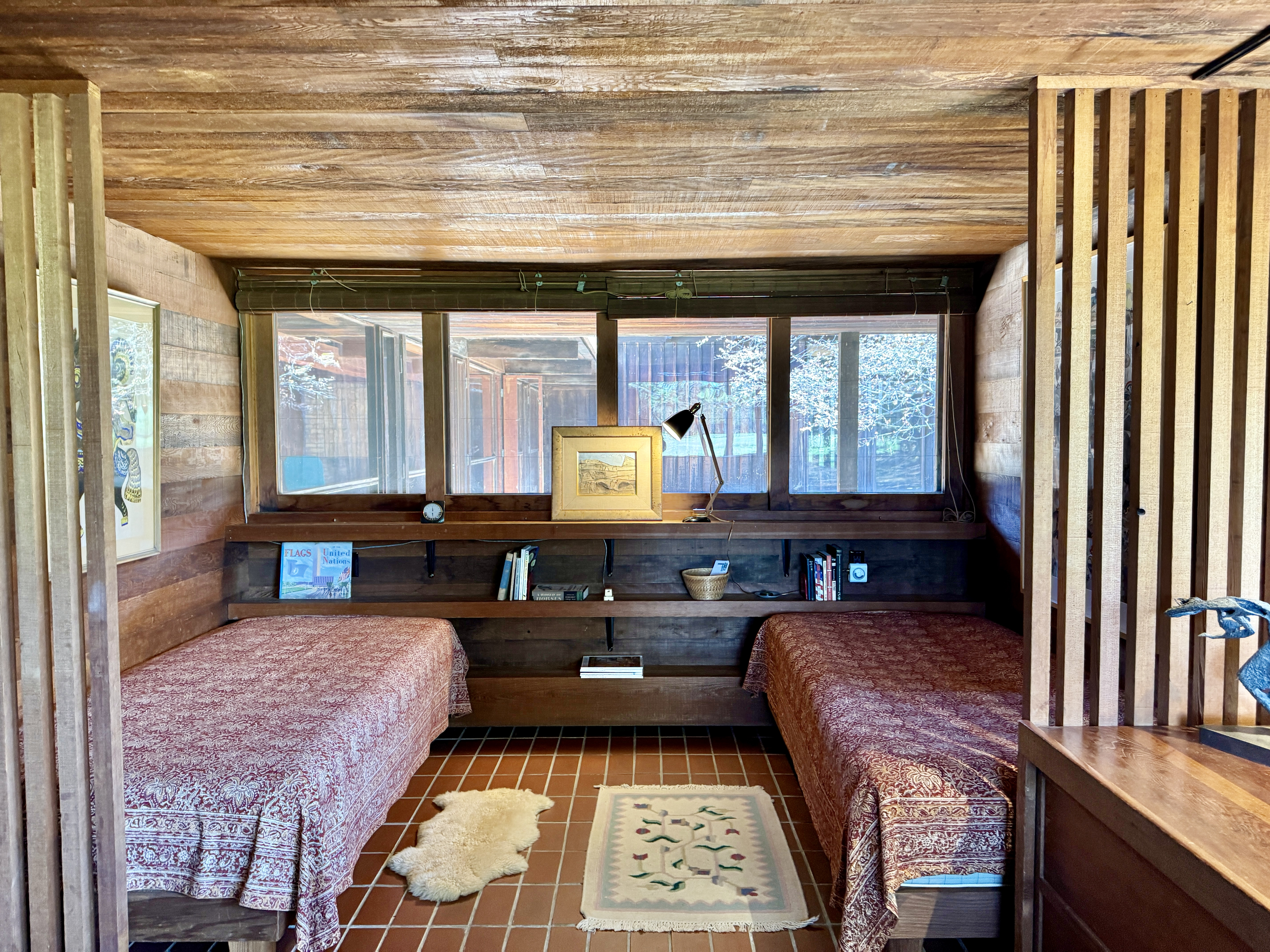
The main sleeping area

Meanwhile, there were discussions over who would maintain the house and how it would be used if the water district agreed to sell it. Metropolitan Water Reclamation District officials said in March 1999 that they would consider selling the house to the village, saying that it had cost the district $600,000 over the preceding 11 years to maintain the house. The village finalized its purchase of the Schweikher House and Studio from the water district in May 1999. It paid about $500,000 for about 2.5 acres (1.0 ha), about one-third of the original estate. The Schaumburg village government promised to lease the building to Martyl Langsdorf until she died. The same year, the village considered repairing the roof, which had drainage issues that were causing damage to the house's rock garden.

The village government hired Vinci Hamp Architects to design a restoration of the building. Vinci Hamp published a report in 2002, estimating that the repairs would cost $472,000 over ten years, though the firm said the building was still in good condition. The structure also retained most of its original design features. Renovations could not begin immediately because Martyl still lived there, though she invited some people to tour the building in the 2000s. These tours were not open to the public and were conducted largely for the benefit of architecture students. The building was not well-known among the general public, even among those who lived in the area, though architects knew about it. In 2009, Martyl helped set up the Schweikher House Preservation Trust to care for the house. The village government's agreement with the Schweikher House Preservation Trust was revised in early March 2013 to allow tours of the house. The tours attracted people who wanted to see both Schweikher's design and Martyl's art, in addition to historians.

Martyl died shortly after signing the revised agreement with the Schweikher House Preservation Trust, and work began in earnest to convert the house and studio to a museum. That October, the village opened the house to public tours for the second time in the building's history. Originally, the house was open only for 48 hours a year, with one-hour tours hosted throughout the year. The village requested in 2015 that the house be given a tax exemption so that repairs on the house could be conducted. The next year, students from the University of Illinois System were invited to conduct studies of the house. In 2019, the village of Schaumburg reached an agreement with the Schweikher House Preservation Trust, allowing the house to be opened to public tours for 472 hours a year. This agreement also allowed the trust to move its offices from the house to a nearby outbuilding. There were also plans to renovate the house and add a gift shop.

== Description ==
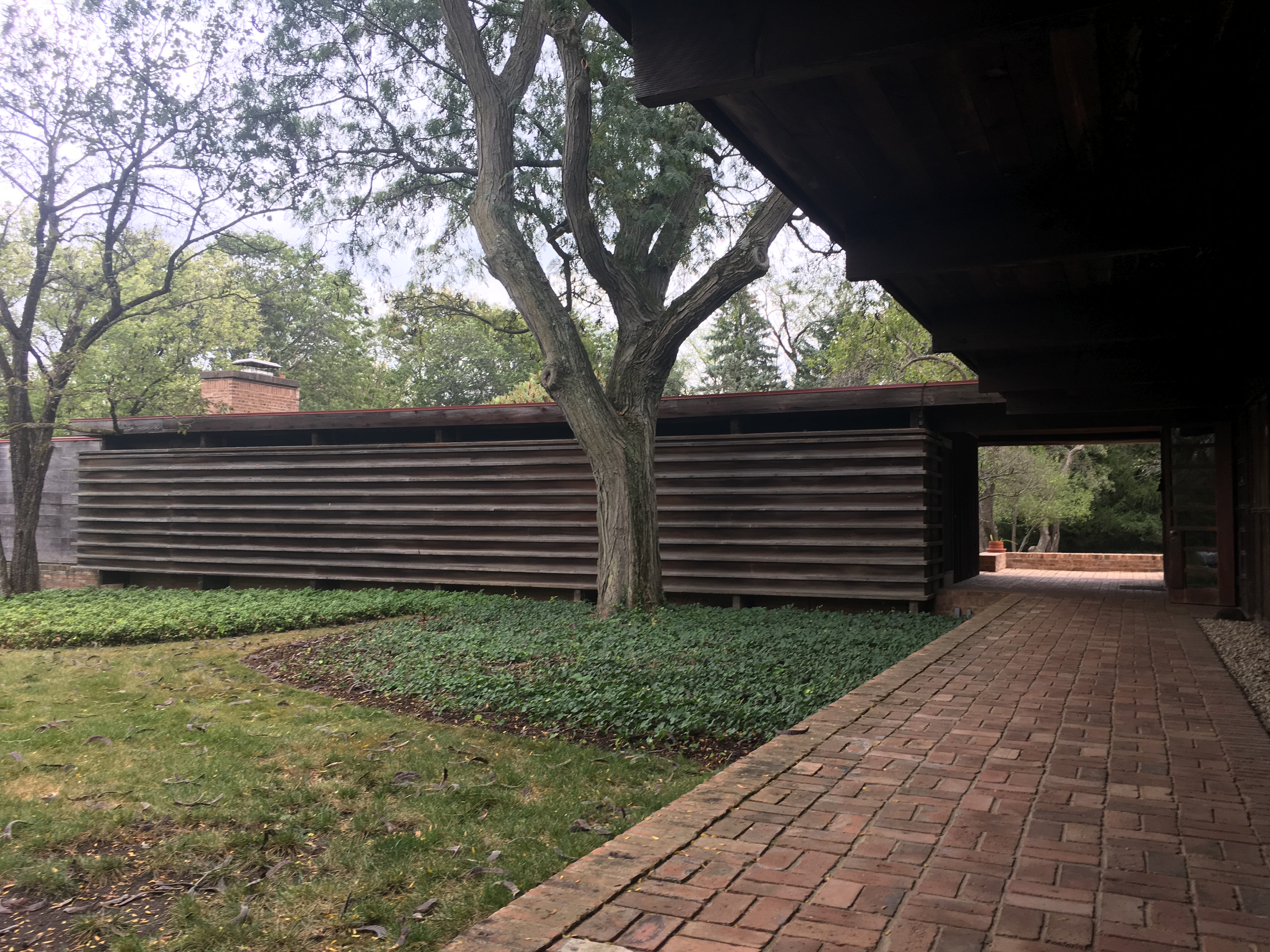
Breezeway connecting the house and studio

The Schweikher House and Studio (also sometimes called the Schweikher-Langsdorf Home and Studio) is located at 645 South Meacham Road in the village of Schaumburg, Illinois, United States. It is accessible only via a 500-foot-long (150 m) driveway from Meacham Road, where none of the building is visible except for a mailbox. The building occupies a site of about 2.5 acres (1.0 ha), along a hill overlooking Salt Creek. The site was originally 7 acres (2.8 ha) but was reduced in 1998 when the village of Schaumburg bought the house. The landscape around the house was designed by Franz Lipp and includes a Japanese rock garden. In addition, there are a vegetable garden, roses, irises, and various fruit trees. Abutting the house and studio to the east is the John Egan sewage plant.

The building itself covers 4,800 square feet (450 m^{2}) and consists of two physically separate structures: a studio and a house, connected by a breezeway. The house and studio are made primarily of glass, Chicago brick, and California redwood, which Schweikher wanted to use "as straight-forwardly as possible". For example, the wood in the house does not have any finishes. The simple materials and low roof helped match the house to its natural environment. The design blends several of the styles in which Schweikher worked throughout his career. For instance, the structures are heavily influenced by the Prairie School style, and it also has International, Japanese, and American vernacular (including Usonian) influences. There are several Moderne design details such as overhanging flat roofs and glass walls.

=== Exterior ===
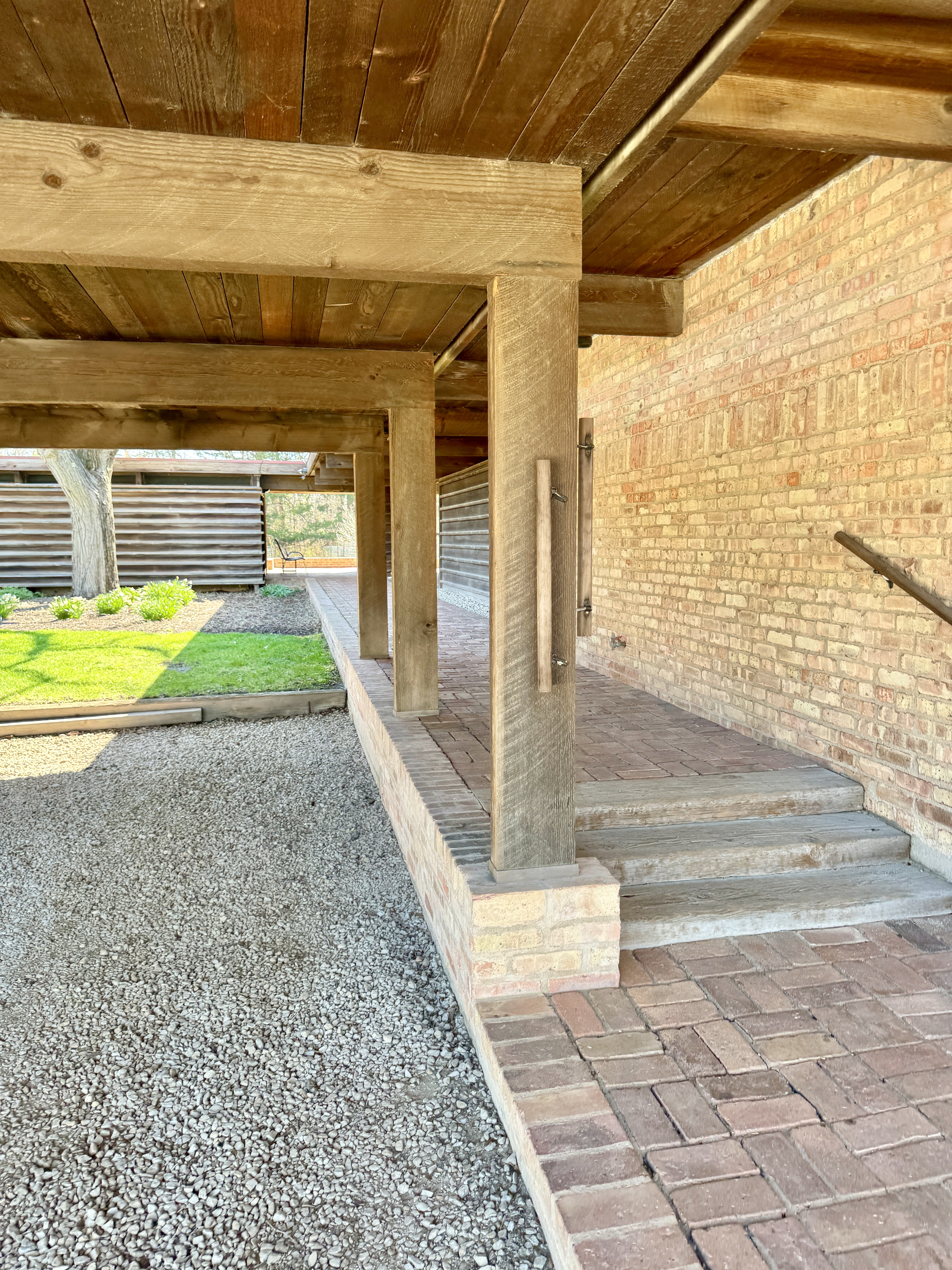
The carport

The structure is one story high with a brick, glass, and wood facade. The living room faces west, the bedrooms face south (in the direction of the low overhead sun during the winter), and the dining room faces east (in the direction of the sunrise). The living room and bedrooms surround a rock garden to the southwest, with a row of plantings on the southern border of the garden. There is an additional child's bedroom to the west, which dates from Schweikher's 1946 modifications. Next to the main house is a carport, which is adjacent to a three-car garage. There is also a gravel parking lot just outside the house.

The exterior is clad with California redwood boards, which are fastened by horizontal and vertical battens measuring 2 by 2 inches (51 mm × 51 mm). These boards conceal a system of wooden posts and joists, which are made of Oregon fir and spaced every 4 or 8 feet (1.2 or 2.4 m). Brick was used for the chimneys. The main entrance is on the facade's northern elevation, which is made of wooden board, except for the section adjacent to the living room, which is a glass wall. It is accessed by a brick pathway leading from the parking area, which leads to a double door with horizontal slatted openings.

Near the eastern end of the house is the breezeway, which links the house with the studio to its north. The breezeway has a canopy above it, connecting the northern wall of the house's kitchen and the southern wall of the studio. There is a rectangular dining-room terrace at the southern end of this breezeway. The studio was designed in the same style as the original house, with high clerestory windows. The entrances to the studio and kitchen both have doors with horizontal openings, similar to those on the front door.

=== Interior ===
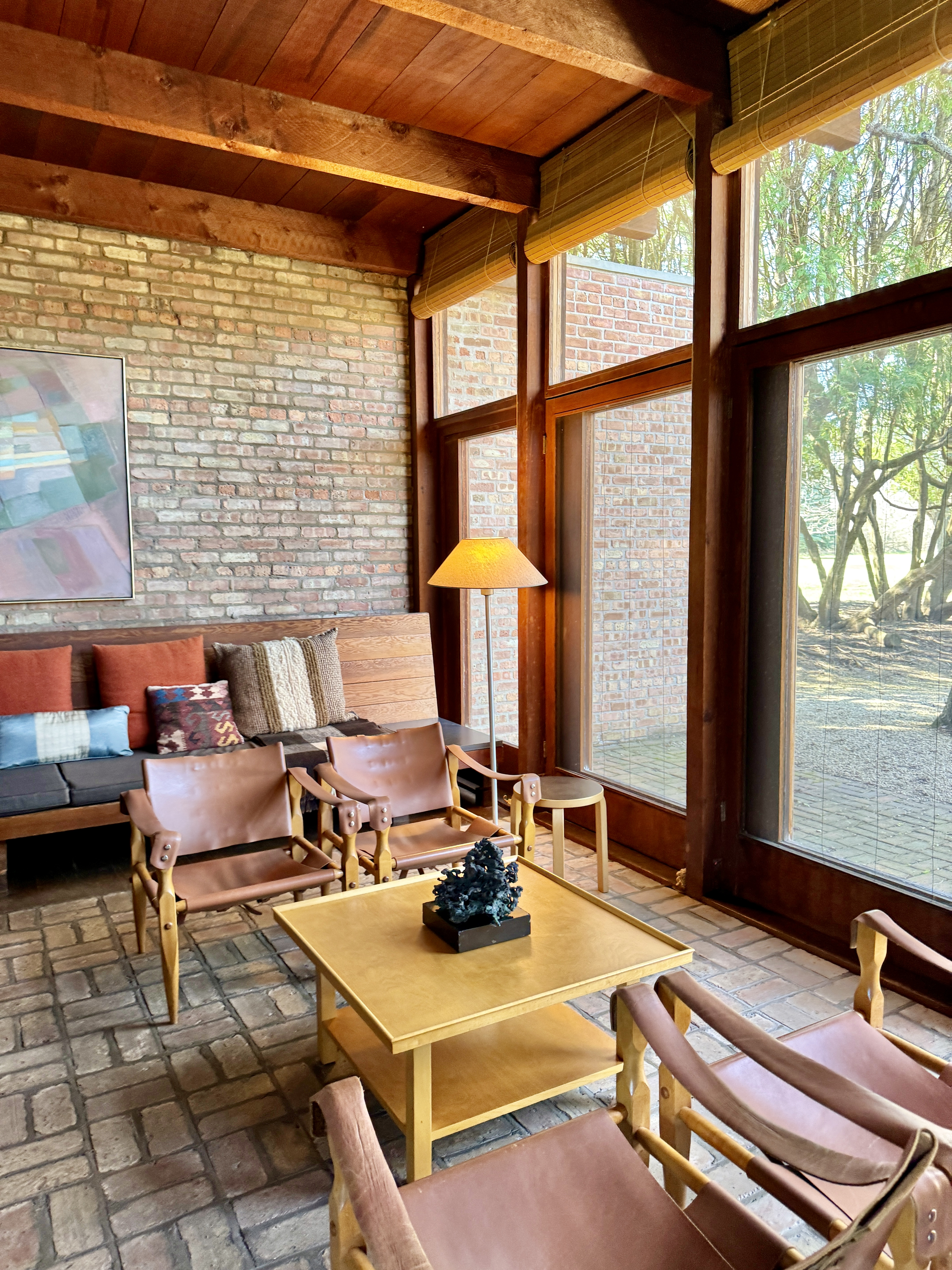
The living room

The building is divided into sleeping, working, and living areas. It originally had three bedrooms, though another bedroom was later created within the studio wing. In general, the building's interior spaces are made of the same materials as the exterior. The floors are covered with teak boards measuring 1 by 8 feet (0.30 by 2.44 m) across, while other surfaces such as walls and ceilings are clad with redwood. Some of the floors are covered with Chicago brick, while brick or glass walls are used in various places throughout. There is built-in furniture throughout the building. When Schweikher lived in the building, the spaces had furnishings such as a wooden refrigerator and Mexican and Indian carpets. The furniture was upholstered in neutral colors, contrasting with the colorful carpets.

The building is primarily illuminated by natural light, though recessed lights are placed in various rooms throughout the house. It also uses several heating systems. There is a passive heating system that is designed to prevent condensation from accumulating on the windows. Throughout the house are radiators (concealed behind wooden cases), as well as convection heaters in the built-in benches. There are also four fireplaces, which have wide brick hearths; the designs of the fireplaces helped inspire those in some of Frank Lloyd Wright's buildings. Radiant heating is used in parts of the building that were added after the fact, including Schweikher's son's bedroom and the studio's guest bedroom. Schweikher's own bedroom has a particularly intricate heating system, with both convection heaters and ventilation openings; the architect said that this would allow him to sense if there were any issues with the heating system. There are also several narrow openings in the walls, measuring 48 by 8 inches (1,220 by 200 mm), which provide cross ventilation.

==== House ====
Within the house's entrance foyer is a brick wall, which has a slight jog to accommodate a niche with artwork. The foyer also has a millwork radiator cover, closets in the walls, and more storage space in the ceiling. The living spaces are within the western end of the building. The living–dining room measures 22 by 32 feet (6.7 by 9.8 m) across, with a ceiling measuring 11 feet (3.4 m) tall. It is surrounded by brick walls and a full-height glass wall overlooking the house's rock garden. The wall containing the fireplace is about 20 feet (6.1 m) wide, with a deep opening for the hearth; a narrow glass wall connects the fireplace wall to an adjacent brick wall. There is a brick floor in front of the living-room fireplace, which extends outward into the breezeway connecting with the studio. The living–dining room's other walls have built-in benches and shelves, and there are columns placed every 4 feet (1.2 m), between which are bookcases. The dining area, at the eastern end of the living–dining room, is separated from the rest of the room by the fireplace wall. The living–dining room is separated from the kitchen by open wooden shelves. The kitchen has a brick floor as well.

The sleeping area, designed as a single large space, leads south from the entrance foyer. This room is accessed by a hallway with a glass wall on one side and storage closets on the other. Described as a solar room, this hall faces south to maximize sunlight exposure during the winter and summer; the south wall has doors leading to the brick court on the southwestern corner of the house. There are two sets of beds—one behind the storage spaces and the other behind a screen—which are placed within a small alcove.

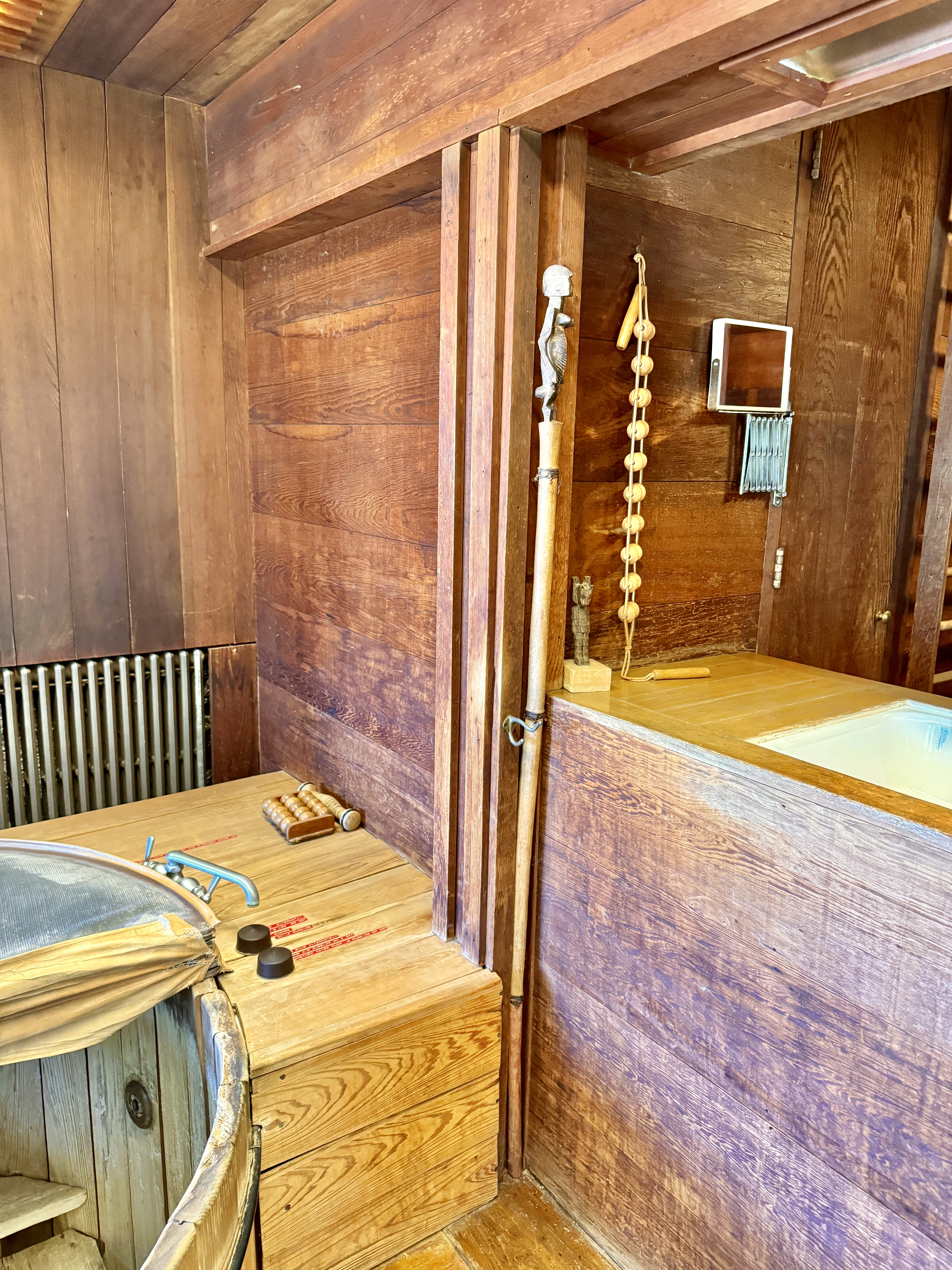
The house's bathroom

There is also a bathroom that can be accessed from both the hallway and main sleeping area. The bathroom has two sinks, a bathing area with a showerhead and bathtub, and a small toilet room in one corner. The bathroom is clad with cypress throughout, and even the bathtub is made of cypress. Another bedroom, intended for Schweikher's son, is accessed from the hallway; it is decorated with redwood and has built-in shelves.

==== Studio ====
The studio extends north of the house. To give his family privacy, Schweikher placed the drafting room in a separate wing. The drafting room measures 20 by 32 feet (6.1 by 9.8 m) across, with clerestory windows on its eastern wall and storage space on its west wall. Sources disagree on whether Schweikher had three or four drafting tables in the studio when he worked there. The southernmost section of the drafting room was originally used as a washroom, while the drafting tables were placed beyond the washroom. When the Langsdorfs moved into the building, the drafting areas became an art studio.

There is a conference room that is cantilevered outward from the studio. The conference room protrudes outward 5 and 10 feet (1.5 and 3.0 m) in different directions, and the cantilevered portions of the conference room have grilles for cooling. There is a radiant heating system in the ceiling of the conference room. The northern end of the studio wing is two stories high because the land slopes down. This part of the studio wing originally had Schweikher's personal office, which has a fireplace on one wall and a glass wall to the north. There is also a guest room in the basement, accessed by a stair hall that is illuminated by a window with slats. After the Langsdorfs moved in, these spaces were converted to bedrooms.

== Reception ==
After the Schweikher House and Studio was completed, The Daily Herald called it "a wonderful example of the modern ideas of construction", while the Chicago Tribune described it as "ingeniously constructed and with a most interesting handling of" wood and brick design elements. A commentator for the Arlington Heights Herald called the building a "unique and charming house". The home's design was praised by contemporary architects, including Ralph Rapson, William Metcalf, and Bertrand Goldberg. Ralph Rapson of the University of Minnesota's Architectural School called the building "one of the most significant early contemporary houses in this part of the country".

A reporter for the Chicago Tribune wrote in 2002 that the structures were "considered by critics to be Schweikher's finest work", while Wallpaper magazine called it "one of Illinois' star buildings, by one of the greats of Midwest modernist architecture". Antique magazine wrote that the design reflected "a highly personal approach to space, one that tapped into aspects of traditional Japanese design and the hallmarks of the Prairie school of architecture", and that it was highly similar to Wright's single-story Usonian buildings.

== See also ==
- National Register of Historic Places listings in Cook County, Illinois
