= Andrene Kauffman =

- Kauffman in 1986
- Born: Camille Andrene Kauffman; April 19, 1905; Chicago, Illinois
- Died: July 4, 1993 (aged 88); Chicago, Illinois
- Occupations: artist, educator
- Years active: 1928–1990
- Known for: murals

Andrene Kauffman (April 19, 1905 – July 4, 1993) was an American painter and educator who created a mural for the post office mural project in Ida Grove, Iowa. She completed twenty-five murals and seven sculptures throughout Chicago, as part of the art projects for the New Deal's Section of Painting and Sculpture. Later, she completed seventeen ceramic murals for the 3rd Unitarian Church, which was designated as a Chicago Landmark in 1960. In addition to her artwork and exhibitions, Kauffman taught art for forty-one years at various universities in Chicago, Rockford, Illinois, and Valparaiso, Indiana.

== Early life ==
Camille Andrene Kauffman was born on April 19, 1905, in Chicago, Cook County, Illinois, to Charlotte Camille (née Henriksen) and George Francis Kauffman Kauffman came from an artistic family. Her father was a dress designer and her paternal grandfather, Francis Xavier Kauffman designed furniture. Her brother G. Francis would become a cartoonist and illustrator. She attended Austin Community Academy High School of Chicago before entering the Art Institute of Chicago, graduating in 1926 and winning the John Quincy Adams Fellowship from the Institute for a year of continued study abroad. In 1927, Kauffman went to Paris, where she studied with André Lhote and traveled throughout Europe, before returning in 1928 to take up a teaching post at Valparaiso University.

== Career ==
Kauffman was hired as a professor of Painting and drawing at the Art Institute of Chicago upon her return and simultaneously worked instructing art at Valparaiso University. Both assignments were part time and in 1933, when she was approached by the Works Progress Administration (WPA), she joined the federal program. During her time with the WPA, Kauffman produced over 50 easel paintings, 25 murals and 7 sculpture projects earning $24.50 per week. Some of her first works for the WPA were murals painted for the Brookfield Zoo, which was under construction at the time. Between 1936 and 1940, Kauffman painted four murals for the cafeteria of the Emil G. Hirsch Metropolitan High School including Amusement Park, Circus, Rodeo, and Stock Show The murals were painted over with housepaint, but the outlines of the canvases are visible on the walls and might be able to be restored. In 1937, Kauffman painted Incidents in the Life of Luther Burbank for the Luther Burbank School. The following year, she completed a second mural at the school, Circus. The murals at Burbank were still extant in 2001.

The playground houses at Oak Park, Illinois, contain Kaufman's bas relief sculptures depicting fairy tales. These included a cast stone relief based on Thumbelina by Hans Christian Andersen, at the Watts Playground on Hayes Avenue at Division Street; a stone sculpture titled The Cutting of the Cake based on Lewis Carroll's Through the Looking Glass, for the Lincoln Playground at Kenilworth Avenue and Fillmore Street; and a cast stone work Captain Flint based on Robert Louis Stevenson's character at the Pyott Playground on Lake Street at Taylor Avenue. She painted murals at the Cook County Children's Hospital, but they were destroyed when the building was demolished. Kauffman created two bas reliefs for the Lincoln Elementary School in Evanston, Illinois. Children in Fruit Tree and Monkeys are intricate wood carvings with three-dimensional style. In addition, she completed commissions at the Washington School in Evanston and the Lowell School in Oak Park, as well as a mural for the Forest Park Public Library. In 1940, Kauffman won the federal commission to paint Preparation for the First County Fair in Ida Grove–1872 for the post office mural in Ida Grove, Iowa.

During her time with the WPA project, Kauffman earned her bachelor's degree in Fine Arts in 1939 and completed her Master of Fine Arts in 1941. In 1943, when the WPA project ended, Kauffman resigned her teaching post at Valparaiso University and took a position as an aircraft engineering drafter in a war plant. When the war ended, she returned to teaching, taking a position at Rockford College as the chair of the art department, while still teaching at the Art Institute of Chicago. In 1947, she designed the Jane Addams medal for Rockford to be awarded to students for distinguished service. Taking a sabbatical to study ceramics in 1951 at the Art Institute, she returned as an associate professor to Rockford in 1952. She completed two ceramic murals that year, Deduction and Induction, which were installed on either side of the entrance of the new science building at the university.

In 1955, Kauffman began a series of seventeen murals for the Third Unitarian Church, for which she also designed a large stained glass window, which is the dominant feature of the south wall of the building. The first ceramic tile portrait was of Woodrow Wilson and was unveiled as part of the centennial celebrations for Wilson's birth. The last portrait was of Roger Williams and was completed in 1963. Kauffman retired in 1967 from the Art Institute, but continued working and exhibiting her works. She held a one-woman show at the Vanderpoel Art Gallery in 1971, painted a mural for the Viola Gitzel Memorial Addition to the Forest Park Library in 1972, and was part of a three-artist exhibit at Loyola University in 1985. One of her works was chosen in 1990 from a state-wide competition, to hang in Chicago's State of Illinois Building.

== Death and legacy ==
Kauffman died on July 4, 1993, in Chicago. Throughout her lifetime, her works were exhibited at the Brooklyn Museum, Riverside Museum and the Whitney Museum of American Art in New York City, as well as at numerous galleries in Chicago. The Third Unitarian Church of Chicago, known as the "church of the murals" because of Kauffman's artwork has been designated a Chicago architectural landmark. Photographs of the murals were displayed in New York and at an exhibit hosted by the U.S. National Society of Mural Painters in Moscow, at the College of Industrial and Applied Arts.
