= William Channing Gannett =

American Unitarian minister (1840–1923)

- Born: March 13, 1840; Boston, Massachusetts, U.S.
- Died: December 15, 1923 (aged 83); Rochester, New York, U.S.
- Education: Harvard College; Harvard Divinity School
- Occupations: Unitarian minister, author
- Spouse: Mary Thorn Lewis (m. 1887)
- Children: 2; Charlotte and Lewis
- Parent(s): Ezra Stiles Gannett; Anna Tilden

William Channing Gannett (March 13, 1840 – December 15, 1923) was an American Unitarian minister. He presided at the Unity Church in Saint Paul, Minnesota from 1877 to 1883, and at the First Unitarian Church in Rochester, New York from 1889 to 1908. A noted author and editor of hymnbooks, Gannett was a central figure in the Western Unitarian Conference, which took the liberal side in the Unitarian Church's doctrinal debates of the late 19th century.

== Early life and education ==
Gannett was born in Boston in March 1840. He was named after, and baptized by, William Ellery Channing, "founder of American Unitarianism". Gannett's father, Ezra Stiles Gannett, was a longtime associate of Channing and, in 1842, succeeded him as minister at Boston's Federal Street Church. Gannett's mother, Anna Tilden, died in childbirth in 1846.

A year after graduating in 1860 with an AB degree from Harvard College, Gannett enrolled at Harvard Divinity School. But he soon left to work on the Sea Islands of South Carolina for the New England Freedmen's Society. He organized a school and managed a plantation where he sought to demonstrate that "illiterate black freedmen would work without the incentive of the lash". After travelling with his father in Europe in 1865–66, Gannett returned to Harvard Divinity School to graduate in 1868.

== Career ==
His first parish was in Milwaukee, "then a Western town of muddy streets and wooden sidewalks". Gannett aligned himself with the Western Unitarian Conference (WUC), which represented the liberal wing of the Unitarian Church. The WUC clashed with the more conservative American Unitarian Association based in the East.

In 1875, Gannett published a biography of his recently deceased father titled Ezra Stiles Gannett: Unitarian Minister in Boston, 1824–1871. It included historical chapters chronicling the evolution of American Unitarianism. He then began his ministry in 1877 at the Unity Church in St. Paul, Minnesota. He was ordained there in 1879, and worked with an architect to design a new Unitarian church building in St. Paul that opened in April 1883.

Gannett played a key role in founding Unity magazine, a Chicago semimonthly launched in March 1878. He and the other Western ministers on Unity's editorial board were known as the "Unity men", and their publication became "the voice of the more radical Unitarians of the West".

At the contentious 1886 WUC convention in Cincinnati, Gannett debated the so-called "creedal issue" with other church leaders including Jabez T. Sunderland. Earlier that year, Sunderland had published a pamphlet, The Issue in the West, which argued for preserving the Christian, theistic roots of Unitarianism, and for resisting a possible WUC takeover by the Free Religious Association (of which Gannett was a member). At the 1886 convention, Gannett proposed a resolution, written in non-theistic language, that the WUC "conditions its fellowship on no dogmatic tests, but welcomes all who wish to join it to help establish truth and righteousness and love in the world." The next year at a WUC meeting in Chicago, Gannett wrote a Statement of Faith which was adopted by the attendees. Titled "Things Commonly Believed Among Us", it included assertions such as "We hold reason and conscience to be final authorities in matters of religious belief", and this notable passage:

Freedom, the method in religion, in place of Authority; Fellowship, the spirit in religion, in place of Sectarianism; Character, the test in religion, in place of Ritual or Creed; Service, or Salvation of Others, the aim in religion, in place of Salvation of Self.

In 1889, Gannett became minister at the First Unitarian Church in Rochester, New York. By then he was widely known as a writer and editor of significant hymns. In 1880 he had collaborated with James V. Blake and Frederick L. Hosmer to compile Unity Hymns and Chorals for the Congregation and the Home, a popular hymnbook that was expanded and reprinted multiple times. In 1885, Gannett co-wrote with Hosmer the anthology, The Thought of God in Hymns and Poems, which had a follow-up volume published in 1894.

Throughout his adult life, Gannett was an ardent abolitionist and supporter of women's suffrage. Susan B. Anthony was a friend and a member of his Rochester congregation.

== Later years ==
After retiring in 1908, Gannett remained in Rochester as pastor emeritus. In his last years, he suffered from deafness and relied increasingly on his wife Mary to champion his various reformist causes.

William Gannett died on December 15, 1923. He was 83.
