= Frederick Lucian Hosmer =

American minister, hymn composer (1840–1929)

Frederick Lucian Hosmer (1840 – 1929) was an American Unitarian minister who served congregations in Massachusetts, Illinois, Ohio, Missouri, and California and who wrote many significant hymns. Beginning in 1875 and continuing for nearly four decades, he and William Channing Gannett worked together, making a contribution to hymnody comparable to that of the "two Sams," Longfellow and Johnson, a generation earlier.

The Unitarian Universalist hymnbook, Singing the Living Tradition contains eight of his hymns, including #45 "Now While the day in Trailing Splendor", #53 "I walk the unfrequented Road", #96 "I Cannot Think of them as Dead", #105 "From Age to Age", "#114 "Forward Through the Ages", #269 "Lo the Day of Days is Here", "#270 "O Day of Light and Gladness", and #272 "O Prophet Souls of All the Years".

His notable hymn, "Forward Through the Ages", was an anthem of the Social Gospel movement. Written while he served the church in California, it replaced the militaristic imagery of Onward Christian Soldiers with a broader evocation of spiritual mission and unity. It is included in the United Methodist Hymnal as #555.

== Biography ==
Frederick Hosmer, was born in Framingham, Massachusetts, on October 16, 1840, the son of Charles and Susan Hosmer. He graduated from Harvard College in 1862 and from the Harvard Divinity School in 1869. He became a friend of William Gannett when both were students at the Divinity School.

In his earlier years he was known as a beloved pastor and an acceptable preacher, his most successful pastorate being that in Cleveland, where he built up a strong and influential church.

On October 26, 1869, he was ordained minister of the First Congregational Church (Unitarian) of Northborough, Massachusetts, where he remained for three years. From October 1872 until April 1877, he served as the Minister at the Quincy Unitarian Church in Quincy, IL. He was active not only as an organizer and director of the activities of young people but as a power in liberalizing the thought of the Quincy, IL community. Thereafter he was minister of the First Unitarian Church of Cleveland, Ohio, 1878–1892. He went on to be the minister of The Church of the Unity in Saint Louis, Missouri from September 1894 to September 1899; and of the First Unitarian Church of Berkeley, California, 1900–15, where he was named minister emeritus until his death on June 7, 1929.

It was not until he approached middle life that he began to write hymns.

In 1880 Hosmer, Gannett and James Vila Blake compiled and edited Unity Hymns and Chorals for the Congregation and the Home, a hymnbook which had a considerable circulation in its day and of which a revised edition was brought out in 1911. In 1885 Hosmer and Gannett published The Thought of God in Hymns and Poems, a book which contained fifty-six pieces by Hosmer.

The English hymnologist Percy Dearmer described Hosmer’s hymn, “O Thou in all thy might so far,” as “this flawless poem, one of the completest expressions of religious faith.” About Hosmer’s hymn “Thy kingdom come—on bended knee/ The passing ages pray,” (written for the 1891 Commencement of the Meadville Theological School), Dearmer wrote, “one of the noblest hymns in the language.”

Hosmer often wrote hymns for special occasions, the most notable instance being his great hymn “O prophet souls of all the years,” written for the Parliament of Religions held in Chicago in 1893, to capture the vision and spirit of that watershed meeting.

It has been said of Frederick Hosmer that he "...was a man of highest ethical standards and keen religious insight. He was never married, but he was a beloved friend and a delightful companion who could entertain with witty impromptu verse as well as illuminate conversation with profound thought. Esteemed as he was as a parish minister, his hymns were the great and lasting contribution which he made to the religious life of his time."
