= Alfred A. Schiller House =

Historic house in Illinois, United States

- U.S. National Register of Historic Places
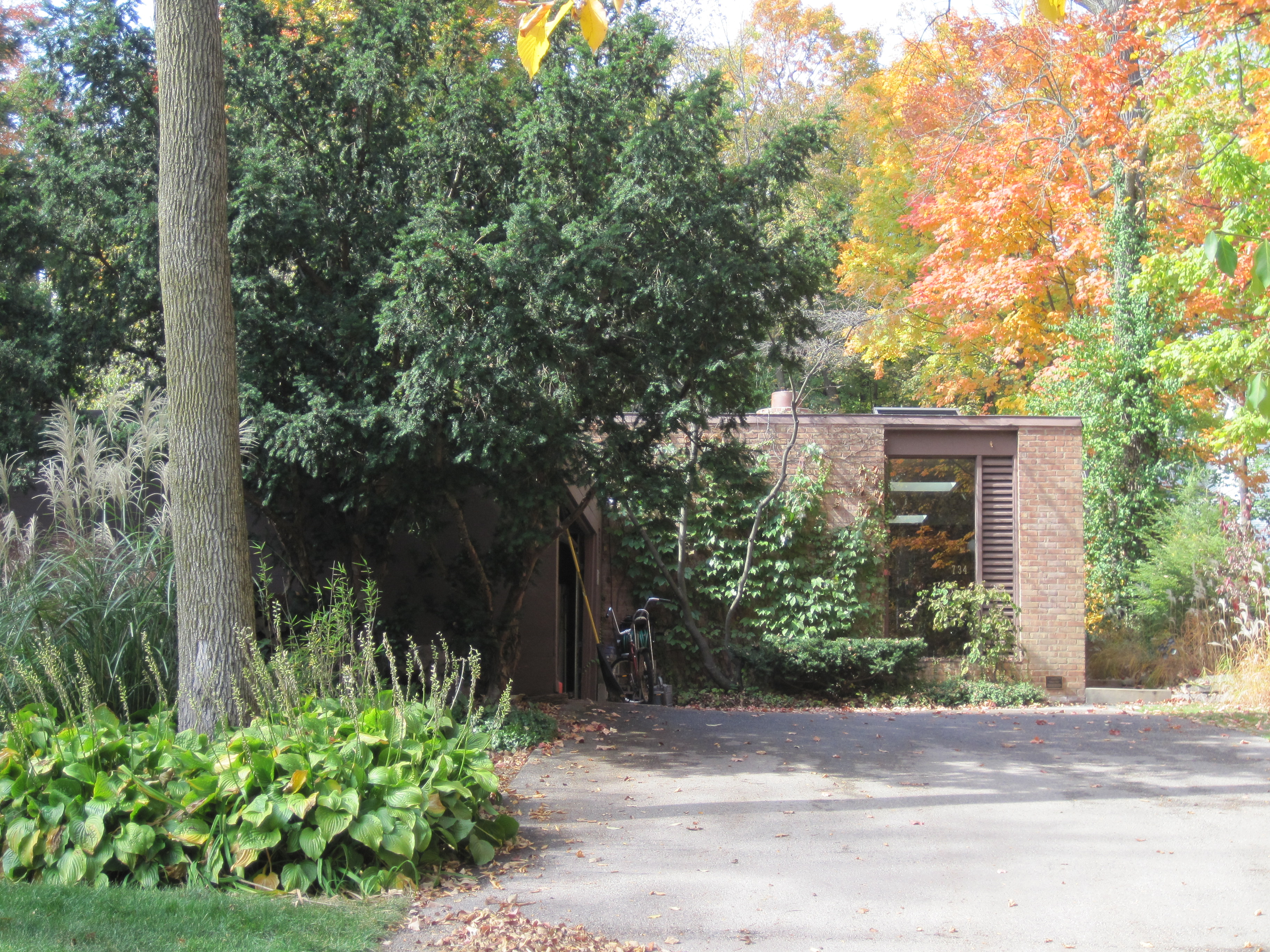
- The Alfred A. Schiller House in 2010. The window was part of a Keck & Keck addition added at a later date.

- Location within Illinois Location within the United States
- Location: 734 Lenox Rd. Glen Ellyn, DuPage County, Illinois, U.S.
- Coordinates: 41°53′14″N 88°3′35″W
- Built: 1954
- Architect: Schweikher & Elting and Keck & Keck
- Architectural style: International Style
- Demolished: 2016
- NRHP reference No.: 08000326
- Added to NRHP: September 3, 2008

The Alfred A. Schiller House was a historic residence in Glen Ellyn, Illinois. It was originally designed by Schweikher & Elting for Alfred Schiller, a professor at the University of Illinois at Chicago. The house featured very few exterior windows, with the only natural light coming in from a central atrium. The house was added to the National Register of Historic Places in 2008, and was demolished in 2016.

== History ==
Alfred A. Schiller was professor of physiology at the University of Illinois College of Medicine. His wife, Elizabeth Schiller, was an artist from Wilmette. The Schillers commissioned the architectural firm of Schweikher & Elting to build a contemporary house in the otherwise traditional Chicago suburb of Glen Ellyn. Paul Schweikher was a notable local architect, and the house was among his last works before moving to Pittsburgh, Pennsylvania. Schweikher had previously designed the Donald Berg House in Glen Ellyn in 1947. After moving to Pittsburgh, Schweikher began to primarily design public buildings and strayed away from residential properties. Thus, the Schiller house represented one of his last ventures in this regard. The house was completed in 1954, but Alfred Schiller died only a year later. Elizabeth Schiller then married Charles Wegener, a professor at the University of Chicago, and moved to the Hyde Park neighborhood of Chicago.

The house was sold to Louis and Louisa Kaberon in 1957. Five years later, the Kaberons decided to put an addition on the house and contacted Paul Schweikher about designing it. Schweikher instead recommended the firm of Keck & Keck for the job, which was completed in 1964. It was added to the National Register of Historic Places on September 3, 2008. After a history of being listed and delisted for sale between 2008 and 2015, the house was sold for the final time on December 16, 2015, to Michael Bartenhagen of the neighboring property at 740 Lenox in Glen Ellyn. The house was destroyed in 2016. The lot has been cleared and landscaped, and now serves as an extended back yard for a neighboring property.

Architecturally, the Schiller house was notable for its lack of windows. It faced east and was almost 100 ft (30 m) away from the sidewalk. The house formed a square doughnut shape due to a central exterior atrium. The outer walls were 40 ft × 40 ft (12 m × 12 m) and were built with Chicago common brick with California redwood trim. Most interior floors were terrazzo and interior walls featured African mahogany, possibly a gift from Elizabeth's father. Walls facing the atrium provided the only natural light with large, floor-to-ceiling plate glass windows. The gardens and courtyard were designed by Mary Moulton, a future librarian at the Morton Arboretum.
