= Birth of a Movement =

2017 US documentary film

- Directed by: Bestor Cram; Susan Gray
- Written by: Kwyn Bader; Dick Lehr
- Based on: Birth of a Movement: How Birth of a Nation Ignited the Battle for Civil Rights by Dick Lehr
- Produced by: Bestor Cram; Susan Gray; Matthew Maclean
- Starring: Bob Bellinger; David Blight; Vincent Brown
- Cinematography: Jesse Beecher; Bestor Cram; Dan Mooney
- Edited by: Dan Mooney
- Music by: John Kusiak; Paul D. Miller
- Release date: February 6, 2017 (PBS)
- Country: United States
- Language: English

Birth of a Movement is a 2017 American documentary film produced by Northern Light Productions and based on the book Birth of a Movement: How Birth of a Nation Ignited the Battle for Civil Rights by Dick Lehr. The film tells the story of how, in 1915, Boston-based African American newspaper editor and activist William Monroe Trotter waged a battle against D.W. Griffith's technically groundbreaking but notoriously Ku Klux Klan-friendly film The Birth of a Nation based on the book The Clansman by Thomas Dixon Jr. Birth of a Nation prompted a debate about race relations, media representation, and the power and influence of Hollywood that still continues. The film explores the backdrop to this clash between human rights, freedom of speech, and a changing media landscape.

The documentary features Spike Lee, whose first film The Answer was an artistic response to The Birth of a Nation; Reginald Hudlin who produced Django Unchained in response to Griffith's film; and Paul Miller, a.k.a. DJ Spooky, who recut his own version of The Birth of a Nation, accompanied by his own original musical score.

Birth of a Movement first aired on PBS' Independent Lens on February 6, 2017, and was one of their most popular programs. It was chosen as a finalist for best documentary film at the 2018 NAACP Image Awards.
