= Northern Light Productions =

Documentary media production company

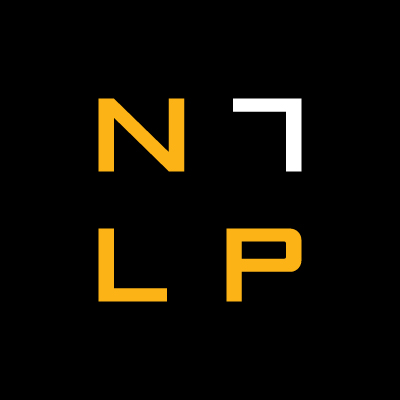
Northern Light Productions Logo

Northern Light Productions is a documentary film and museum media production company based in Boston, Massachusetts. Founded in 1982 by independent filmmaker Bestor Cram, the company is one of New England's premiere production organizations, creating a variety of work for museums, visitor centers, educational institutions, and television broadcast worldwide.

== History ==
Northern Light Productions was founded in 1982 when Bestor Cram, himself a Vietnam Veteran, produced How Far Home, a documentary film about the dedication of the Vietnam Veterans Memorial in Washington, DC. In 2001 another landmark film about the Vietnam War, co-produced by Northern Light Productions and titled Unfinished Symphony, premiered at the Sundance Film Festival. The film went on to screen extensively throughout the United States and Europe. Unfinished Symphony, divided into three sections and mirroring the movements of Henryk Górecki's Symphony No. 3, focuses on a 1971 three-day protest in Lexington, MA staged by newly returned war veterans.

Over the years, Northern Light Productions has had films in The Sundance Film Festival, The Boston Film Festival, The Austin Film Festival, Hot Docs Canadian International Documentary Festival, International Documentary Film Festival Amsterdam, and others.

== Recent film and television ==
Birth of a Movement: The Battle Against America's First Blockbuster aired on PBS's Independent Lens on February 6, 2017. It premiered in Boston at the Somerville Theater and in New York at the Schomburg Center for Research in Black Culture of the New York Public Library.

Beyond The Wall, which premiered at the Independent Film Festival of Boston in May 2016, follows five formerly incarcerated men who are attempting to rebuild their lives on the outside with little support from our criminal justice system. It was also featured at the Woods Hole Film Festival, the Newburyport Documentary Film Festival, the Social Law Film Series, and more.

Circus Without Borders premiered at the Independent Film Festival of Boston in April 2015. The film was additionally screened at the Montreal First Peoples Festival, the Boston Globe's GlobeDocs film festival, the Margaret Mead Film Festival at the American Museum of Natural History in New York, the Woods Hole Film Festival, the Roxbury International Film Festival at the Museum of Fine Arts, Boston, and the Anchorage International Film Festival. In 2015 and 2016, the Pulitzer Center on Crisis Reporting featured the film as part of a traveling series.

This Is Where We Take Our Stand, a feature-length film about veterans and active duty soldiers who voiced their opposition to the war in Iraq and Afghanistan by testifying from personal experience in Washington DC.

Primal Fear, a one-hour Halloween special for The History Channel.

Johnny Cash at Folsom Prison, a one-hour special included with the Johnny Cash at Folsom Prison album's re-release from Columbia Records.

Killer Poet: The Double Life of Norman Porter, a feature-length film about the life of escaped-convict-turned-poet Norman Porter, AKA J. J. Jameson.

== Recent museum ==
12 media exhibits for Ocean Hall in the Smithsonian's National Museum of Natural History in Washington, DC.

An orientation experience for Lassen National Park in Mineral, CA.

Destination Indiana, an interactive virtual time-travel experience for the Indiana Historical Society in Indianapolis, IN.

17 media exhibits for the Museum at Bethel Woods at the Bethel Woods Center for the Arts
