= J. J. Jameson =

American poet and activist (died 2023)

J. J. Jameson (born Norman A. Porter Jr.; January 28, 1940 – December 27, 2023) was a self-proclaimed poet and activist, who was active in Chicago, Illinois, from the mid-1980s until March 2005. His work was marked by an ironic and humorous style.

== Background ==
Jameson was best known for his live performances as a poet and MC at local poetry jams and open mike nights. He also received attention for his September 1999 poetry chapbook, Lady Rutherford's Cauliflower, published by Puddin'head Press, which had been planning to publish a second volume of his work. He was known to be suffering from head tumors in early 2005. In March 2005 Jameson was named Poet of the Month by C. J. Laity of ChicagoPoetry.com. Friends and acquaintances planned to celebrate the twentieth anniversary of his arrival in Chicago with a roast and poetry reading later in 2005.

On March 22, 2005, at 11:00 he was arrested by the Massachusetts State Police, Illinois State Police and the Massachusetts Department of Correction in Chicago at the Third Unitarian Church, where he was a member of the congregation and sometimes worked as a handyman. Porter was then transferred under armed guard to Massachusetts where he faced charges of escape from a penal institution.

Porter pleaded guilty to charges of second degree murder in the 1960 fatal shooting of 22-year-old part-time clothing store clerk, John Pigott, at the Robert Hall clothing store in Saugus, Massachusetts, with a sawed-off shotgun. In 1961, while awaiting trial on those charges, Porter was involved in the fatal assault in and shooting of the head jailer, David S. Robinson, at Middlesex County jail in Cambridge, Massachusetts, and escaped from prison only to be captured while holding up a grocery store in New Hampshire. He also pleaded guilty to charges of second-degree murder in that case, and was sentenced to two consecutive terms of life imprisonment.

While in prison, Porter earned an undergraduate degree from Boston University, started a prison newspaper, published poetry, and founded a prison radio station. One of his life sentences was commuted by Governor Michael Dukakis in 1975. In December 1985, while being held at a prerelease center, he escaped by signing himself out for a walk, and never returned to the facility until he was caught on March 22, 2005. Since his escape, he had been Massachusetts' most wanted fugitive, ahead of mobster boss James "Whitey" Bulger.

Jameson was connected with Porter when fingerprints taken during a 1993 arrest were matched against Porter's fingerprints in an FBI database after a police officer saw his picture as Poet of the Month on ChicagoPoetry.com.

On October 14, 2005, Porter was sentenced to three years in prison for his escape. He had a parole hearing Tuesday, October 6, 2009.

The 2008 film Killer Poet, produced by Northern Light Productions, documented the Norman Porter story.

Porter was denied parole by the Massachusetts Parole Board on January 12, 2010. Despite the support of prison officials and members of a Chicago church congregation, the parole board rejected Porter's request because he showed "limited remorse" and "continues to minimize his criminal activity."

Porter was again denied parole on November 19, 2019. He was released on medical parole on July 5, 2022.

Porter died on December 27, 2023, at the age of 83.

== Books ==
- Lavoie, Denise (March 24, 2005). "Fugitive murderer held after 20 years on the lam". Boston Globe. Archived from the original on March 26, 2005.
- "Book of Voices: Featured Artist: J.J. Jameson". E-Poets' Network.
- Rybarczyk, Tom (March 23, 2005). "Chicago poet seized as fugitive killer". Chicago Tribune.
- "Chicago Poet Led Double Life". CBS 2 Chicago. March 23, 2005. Archived from the original on February 2, 2006.
- "Puddin'head Press". Homepage.
- "Norman A. Porter Case Detail". Massachusetts Department of Corrections.
- "Norman A. Porter Wanted Summary". Massachusetts Department of Corrections.
- Fingerprints Don't Lie
- Brokaw, Leslie (June 8, 2008). "Tracking a Mass. Murder Mystery". Boston Globe. Archived from the original on October 23, 2012.
