= Bulletin of the Atomic Scientists =

Nonprofit organization and journal concerning science and global security issues

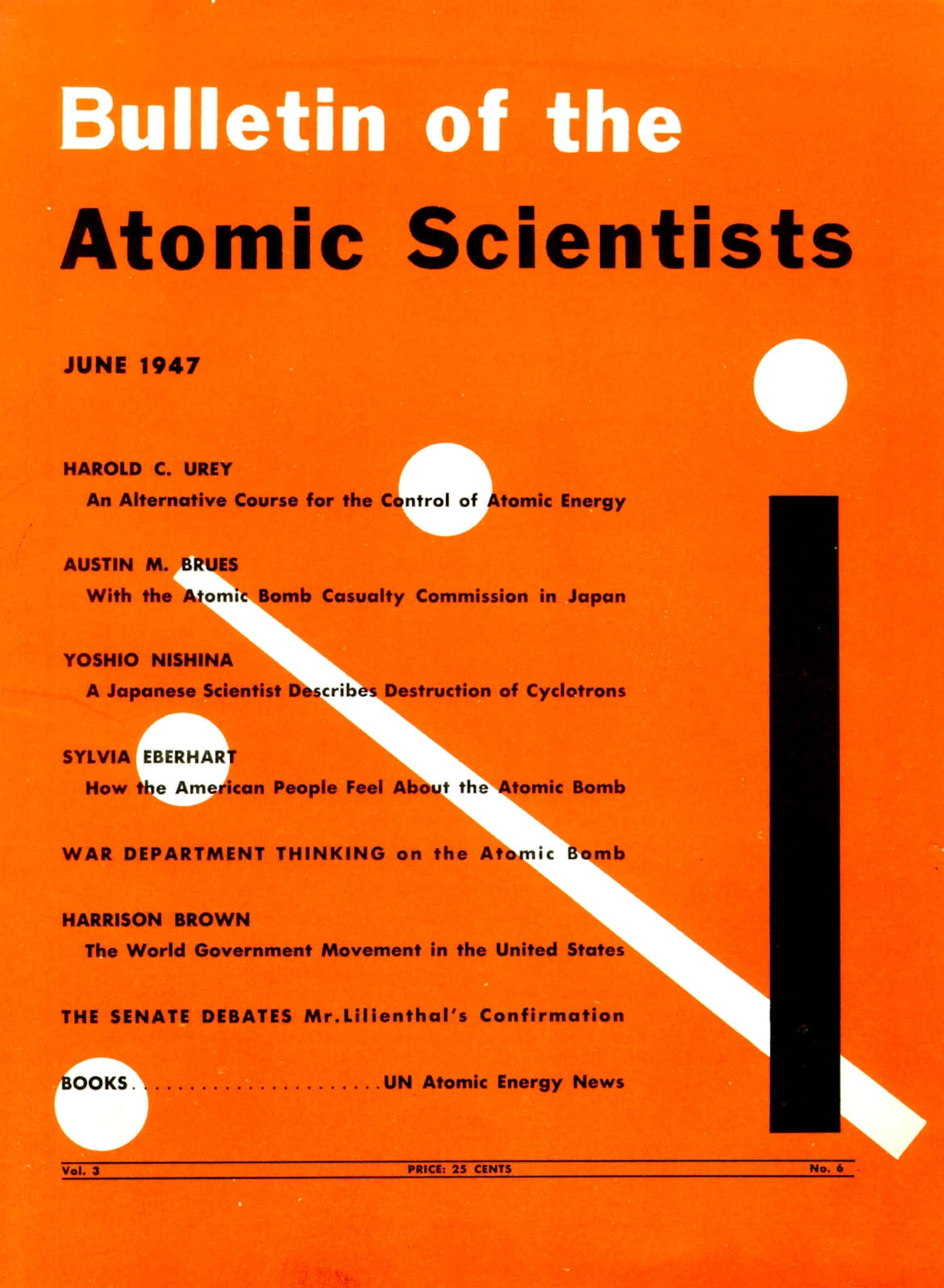
- The cover of the Bulletin of the Atomic Scientists has featured the famous Doomsday Clock since it debuted in 1947, when it was set at seven minutes to midnight.
- Discipline: Science policy
- Language: English
- Edited by: John Mecklin

Publication details
- Former name: Bulletin of the Atomic Scientists of Chicago
- History: 1945–present
- Publisher: Taylor and Francis for the Bulletin of the Atomic Scientists (United States)
- Frequency: Bimonthly
- Impact factor: 1.9 (2023)

Standard abbreviations
- ISO 4: Bull. At. Sci.

Indexing
- CODEN: BASIAP
- ISSN: 0096-3402 (print); 1938-3282 (web)
- LCCN: 48034039
- OCLC no.: 470268256

Links
- Journal homepage; Free-access website; Taylor & Francis Online

The Bulletin of the Atomic Scientists is a bi-monthly, nontechnical academic journal, published by an organization of the same name. The organization named "Bulletin of the Atomic Scientists" is a nonprofit organization concerning science and global security issues resulting from accelerating technological advances that have negative consequences for humanity. It publishes content both at a free-access website and through the journal. The organization has been publishing continuously since 1945, when it was founded by former Manhattan Project scientists as the Bulletin of the Atomic Scientists of Chicago immediately following the atomic bombings of Hiroshima and Nagasaki. The organization is also the keeper of the symbolic Doomsday Clock, the time of which is announced each January.

== Background ==
One of the driving forces behind the creation of the Bulletin was the amount of public interest surrounding atomic energy and rapid technological change at the dawn of the Atomic Age. In 1945 the public interest in atomic warfare and weaponry inspired contributors to the Bulletin to attempt to inform those interested about the dangers of the nuclear arms race they knew was coming and about the destruction that atomic war could bring about. To convey the particular peril posed by nuclear weapons, the Bulletin devised the Doomsday Clock in 1947, with an original setting of seven minutes to midnight.

The minute hand of the Clock first moved closer to midnight in response to changing world events in 1949, following the first Soviet nuclear test. The Clock has been set forward and back over the years as circumstances have changed; as of 2026, it is set at 85 seconds to midnight. The Doomsday Clock is used to represent threats to humanity from a variety of sources: nuclear and other weapons of mass destruction, climate change, and disruptive technologies. In 2015, the Bulletin unveiled its Doomsday Dashboard, an interactive infographic that illustrates some of the data the Bulletin's Science and Security Board takes into account when deciding the time of the Clock each year. As of August 2018, the Bulletin's Board of Sponsors boasts 14 Nobel Laureates.

In the 1950s, the Bulletin was involved in the formation of the Pugwash Conferences on Science and World Affairs, annual conferences of scientists concerned about nuclear proliferation, and, more broadly, the role of science in modern society.

== History ==
In late 1945, scientists from the University of Chicago who had been involved in the Manhattan Project that had created the A-bomb formed a group using the name "Atomic Scientists of Chicago" and started publishing a newsletter titled Bulletin of the Atomic Scientists of Chicago. The words of Chicago were dropped as of the seventh issue, of March 15, 1946, to reflect "the increasingly broad nature of the contents of, and the wider geographical distribution of the contributors to, the Bulletin". The founder and first editor of the Bulletin of the Atomic Scientists was biophysicist Eugene Rabinowitch (1901–1973). He founded the magazine, then a newsletter, with physicist Hyman Goldsmith. Rabinowitch was a professor of botany and biophysics at the University of Illinois and was also a founding member of the Continuing Committee for the Pugwash Conferences on Science and World Affairs. In addition to Rabinowitch and Goldsmith, contributors have included: Morton Grodzins, Hans Bethe, Anatoli Blagonravov, Max Born, Harrison Brown, Stuart Chase, Brock Chisholm, E.U. Condon, Albert Einstein, E.K. Fedorov, Bernard T. Feld, James Franck, Ralph E. Lapp, Richard S. Leghorn, J. Robert Oppenheimer (first chairman of the board of the organization), Lord Boyd Orr, Michael Polanyi, Louis Ridenour, Bertrand Russell, Nikolay Semyonov, Leó Szilárd, Edward Teller, A.V. Topchiev, Harold C. Urey, Paul Weiss, James L. Tuck, among many others.

In 1949, the Educational Foundation for Nuclear Science incorporated as a not-for-profit 501(c)(3) organization to serve as the parent organization and fundraising mechanism of the Bulletin. In 2003, the board of directors voted to change the foundation's name to Bulletin of the Atomic Scientists.

== Purpose ==
The Bulletin of the Atomic Scientists began as an emergency action undertaken by scientists who saw urgent need for an immediate educational program about atomic weapons. The intention was to educate fellow scientists about the relationship between their world of science and the world of national and international politics. A second goal was to help the American people understand what nuclear energy and its possible applications to war meant. The Bulletin contributors believed the atom bomb would only be the first of many dangers. The aim of the Bulletin was to carry out the long, sustained effort of educating people about the realities of the scientific age.

== Doomsday Clock ==
The Bulletin's logo of the Doomsday Clock as of January 2026.

Once the Soviet Union developed atomic weapons, the concern surrounding the world's destruction was a great fear of the scientists working on the Bulletin. The proximity of nuclear devastation was a popular interest and, as a result, Bulletin co-editor Hyman Goldsmith asked landscape artist Martyl Langsdorf to create a cover for the June 1947 magazine. Langsdorf, who was married to Manhattan Project physicist Alexander Langsdorf, first considered using the symbol for uranium but then realized that a clock would better convey "a sense of urgency." The resultant Doomsday Clock, which only has bullets labeling the numbers in the upper left hand corner, has been featured on the cover of the Bulletin many times since its creation.

The proximity of the minute hand to midnight has been the Bulletin leadership's way of warning the public about manmade threats to humanity; the Clock is a metaphor, not a prediction. That is, the time on the clock is not to be interpreted as actual time. When it began in 1947, the minute hand was 7 minutes to midnight; in 1953, when the Soviet Union continued to test more and more nuclear devices, it was 2 minutes to midnight. This proximity to midnight of the Doomsday Clock during the early 1950s shows the concern that the Bulletin contributors had about the Soviet Union and the nuclear arms race. The warnings of the Bulletin continued throughout the 1950s and 1960s, and the focus of the efforts shifted slightly from warning about the dangers of nuclear war to the necessity of disarmament. In 2007, the leadership began taking anthropogenic climate change into account in its Clock discussions. Throughout the history of the Doomsday Clock, it has moved closer to midnight, and farther away, depending upon the status of the world at that time. The Clock has been getting closer to midnight since 1991, when it was set to 17 minutes to midnight, after the United States and the Soviet Union reached an agreement on nuclear arms reductions.

As of January 27, 2026, the Doomsday Clock stands at 85 seconds to midnight. It is the closest approach to midnight, exceeding that of 1953, 2018, 2020, 2023, and most recently 2025. The decision to move the hand of the Clock is made by the Bulletin's Science and Security Board, which meets in person twice a year, with subcommittees meeting more often; the announcement of the decision is made every January. Each November, prior to the Science and Security Board's fall discussion, the Bulletin hosts an annual dinner and meeting in Chicago; both events are open to the public. Reflecting international events dangerous to humankind, the Clock has been adjusted 27 times since its inception in 1947, when it was initially set to seven minutes to midnight (11:53pm).

== Online editions ==
The Bulletin has had a public-access website available online for some years, with a subscription magazine that comes out 6 times per year and is currently published by Taylor & Francis Online. An e-newsletter is also available without charge by signing up via the Bulletin website.

Backfiles of the subscription magazine are available in the John A. Simpson Collection. The backfile from the first (1945) issue through the November 1998 issue of the Bulletin has also been made available free of charge via Google Books.

November/December 2008 was the last print edition of the Bulletin, which became all-digital only that year. SAGE Publications began publishing the Bulletin's subscription magazine in September 2010; Taylor & Francis took over from Sage in January 2016.

== Indexing ==
The journal is indexed in the Journal Citation Reports, which states that the journal has a 2023 impact factor of 1.9, ranking it 44th out of 166 journals in the category "International Relations" and 26th out of 67 journals in the category "Social Issues".

== See also ==
- Emergency Committee of Atomic Scientists
- Franck Report
- List of international relations journals
- Richard Garwin

== Notes and references ==
The records of the Bulletin are kept at the Special Collections Research Center of the University of Chicago Library.
