= Martyl Langsdorf =

American artist (1917–2013)

Martyl Suzanne Schweig Langsdorf
- Martyl Langsdorf, circa 1962
- Born: Martyl Suzanne Schweig; March 16, 1917; St. Louis, Missouri
- Died: March 26, 2013 (aged 96); Schaumburg, Illinois
- Education: Washington University in St. Louis
- Occupation: Artist
- Known for: Created the Doomsday Clock image
- Spouse(s): Alexander Langsdorf, Jr.
- Children: Alexandra, Suzanne
- Website: martyl.com

Martyl Suzanne Schweig Langsdorf (March 16, 1917 – March 26, 2013) was an American artist who created the Doomsday Clock image for the June 1947 cover of the Bulletin of the Atomic Scientists.

== Life and career ==
"Cyrus Tiffany in the Battle of Lake Erie, September 13, 1813," mural by Martyl Schweig Langsdorf in the Record of Deeds building, Washington, D.C.

Schweig Langsdorf was born in St. Louis, Missouri. Her mother was the painter Aimee Schweig and her father was the portrait photographer Martin Schweig, Sr. As a young woman she attended painting classes with her mother, first at the Provincetown Art Colony (Provincetown, Massachusetts), and then at the Ste. Genevieve Art Colony. She earned a degree from Washington University in St. Louis. In 1942 she married physicist Alexander Langsdorf, Jr. who worked on the Manhattan Project. They had two daughters, Alexandra and Suzanne.

Alexander helped found the Bulletin of the Atomic Scientists in 1945 and in 1947 Martyl created the Doomsday Clock image for their first June 1947. She thought a clock, set at seven minutes to midnight, would convey "a sense of urgency." The Doomsday Clock illustration was the only magazine cover she ever created. Both before and after that project, she painted abstract landscapes and murals. Her mural work includes an oil-on-canvas mural titled Wheat Workers for the Russell, Kansas post office, commissioned by the Treasury Section of Fine Arts, and completed in 1940.

In 1953, the Langsdorfs moved into the Paul Schweikher House and Studio in Schaumburg, Illinois. Designed by Paul Schweikher and built in 1938, Schweig Langsdorf lived and worked there until her death. The house and studio are on the National Register of Historic Places.

Schweig Langsdorf died of complications of a lung infection in Schaumburg, Illinois.

Her work is in the collection of the Art Institute of Chicago, the Pennsylvania Academy of the Fine Arts, the Saint Louis Art Museum, the Smithsonian American Art Museum, and the Whitney Museum of American Art. Her paper are in the collection of the Archives of American Art at the Smithsonian Institution.
