= Paul Schweikher =

American architect (1903–1997)

- Born: July 28, 1903; Denver, Colorado, U.S.
- Died: December 23, 1997 (aged 94); Phoenix, Arizona, U.S.
- Occupation: Architect

Robert Paul Schweikher (1903–1997) was a mid-century modern architect from Denver, Colorado.

== Biography ==
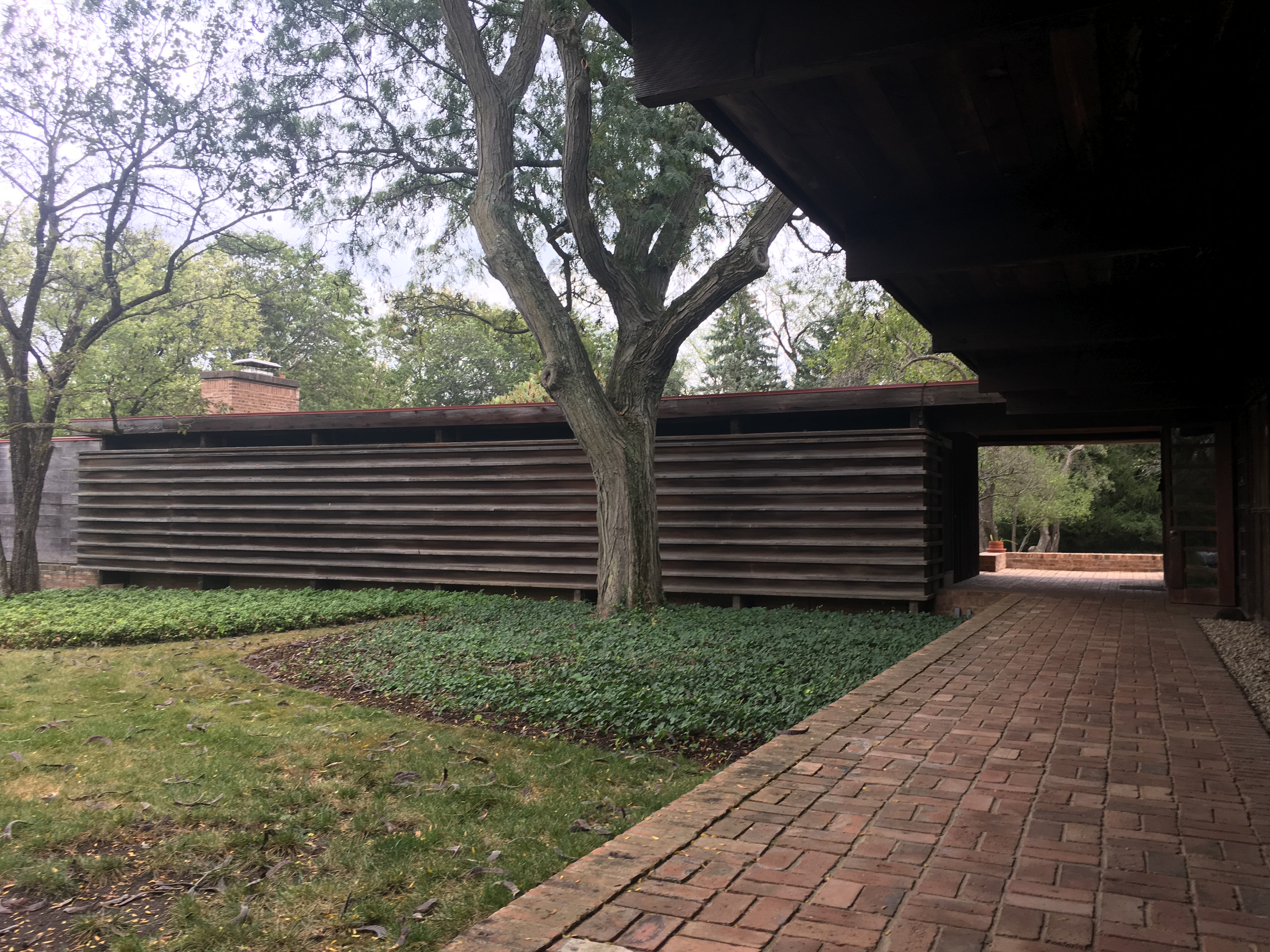
A photo from the brick walkway of the Paul Schweikher House and Studio. This photo shows the studio portion of the home and the breezeway that connects the home to the studio. Designed for himself and his family, it was completed in 1938, and served as his architectural studio for many years.

Paul Schweikher was born in Denver, Colorado in 1903 to a family of musicians. He originally trained at the University of Colorado Boulder for a year (1921–22) before marrying his wife, Dorothy Miller. He moved with her to Chicago, Illinois and studied at The Art Institute of Chicago while working for the firm of Lowe & Bollenbacher. Schweikher worked his way up from a clerk to a construction supervisor. After two-and-a-half years at the firm, Schweikher left to join the David Adler practice. Among the projects that Schweikher worked on was the William McCormick Blair Estate in Lake Bluff, Illinois.

He later studied at the Armour Institute of Technology before again transferring to, and receiving a degree from, the Yale School of Architecture. He returned to Chicago after his schooling in 1930 and collaborated with George Fred Keck and Philip Maher. He quickly rose to prominence, and his works were included in an exhibition at the Museum of Modern Art in 1933. His work was also exhibited at the Century of Progress International Exposition. Schweikher joined the practice of Lamb and Elting in 1934.

In 1953, Schweikher was named chairman of the Yale School of Architecture, following the retirement of George Howe. Five years later, he resigned from the university to take a position as head of the Carnegie School of Architecture. He retired in 1970 and moved to Sedona, Arizona, where he opened a small practice. Schweikher died in 1997.

== Buildings and projects ==
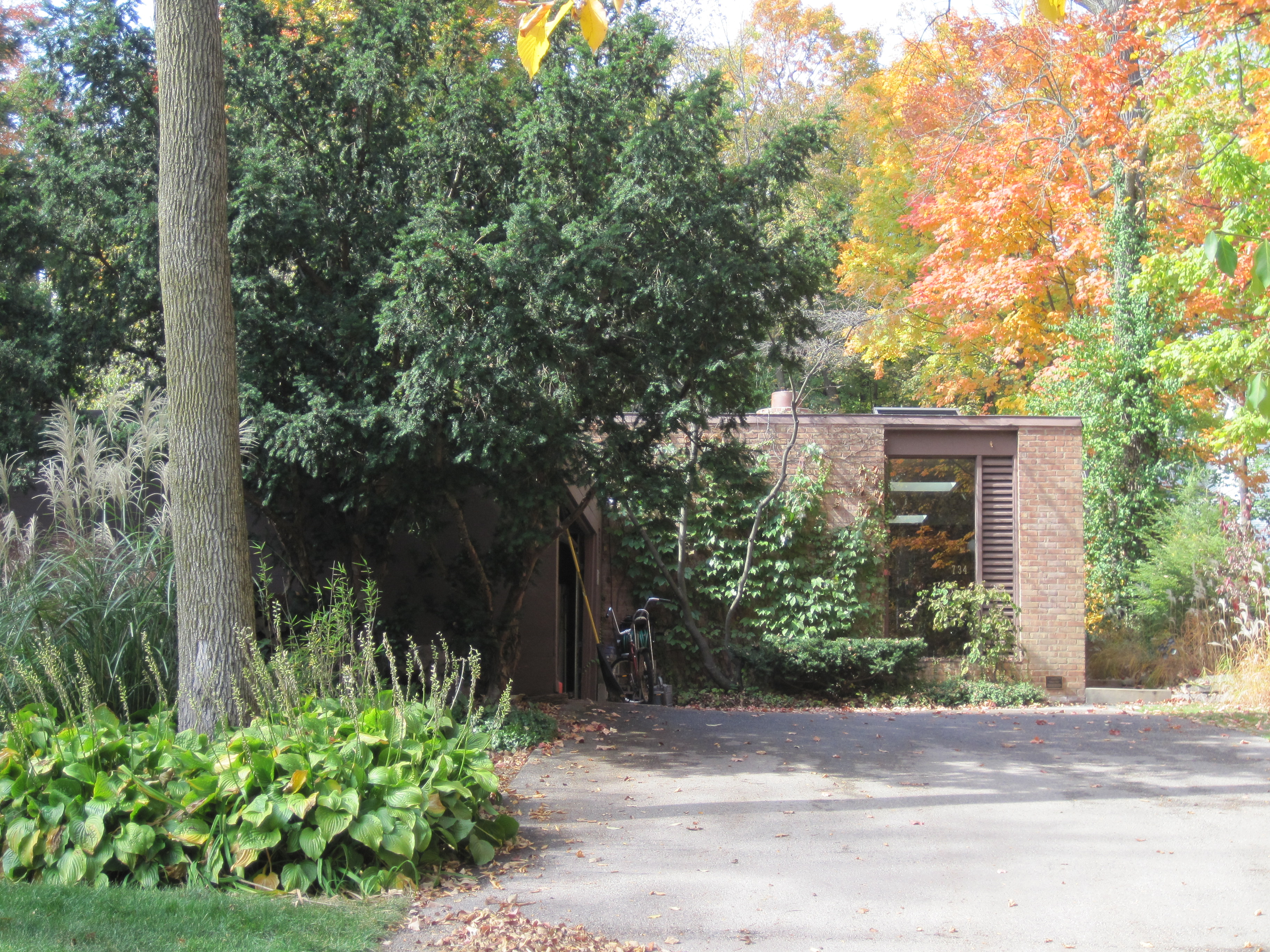
The Alfred A. Schiller House in Glen Ellyn, Illinois. The house was specifically designed to be concealed from the street and to only have windows on the interior facing an atrium. An exterior window was later installed on east side.

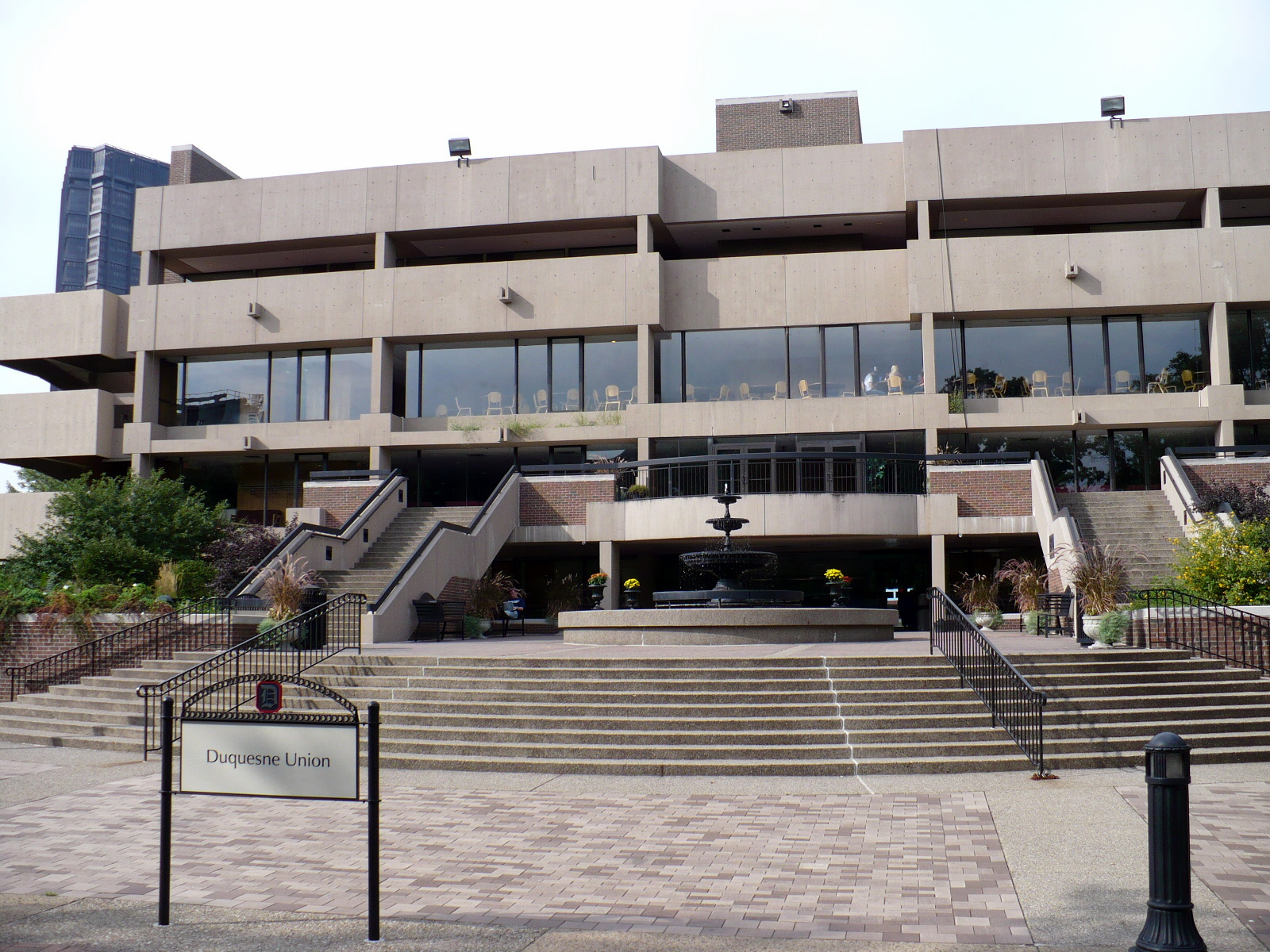
Schweikher designed the student union at Duquesne University.

- 1932: Eliason House, Chicago, Illinois. (unbuilt)
  - Model exhibited at the Museum of Modern Art in 1933.
- 1936: Third Unitarian Church, Chicago, Illinois.
  - Listed as a Chicago landmark.
- 1937–38: Paul Schweikher House and Studio, Roselle (now Schaumburg), Illinois.
  - Listed on the National Register of Historic Places.
- 1939–42: Redwood Village Cooperative (a.k.a. North Shore Cooperative), Glenview, Illinois.
- 1940: Lewis House, Park Ridge, Illinois.
- 1940: S.W. Burda House, Mount Prospect, Illinois.
- 1947: Donald Berg House, Glen Ellyn, Illinois.
- 1948: Upton House, Scottsdale, Arizona. (later destroyed)
- 1949: Ernest and Lucinda Burhans House, Peoria, Illinois.
- 1950: Finch House, Paradise Valley, Arizona.
- 1950: R. Harring, Jr. House, Highland Park, Illinois.
- 1954: Alfred A. Schiller House, Glen Ellyn, Illinois. (Destroyed 2016)
  - Listed on the National Register of Historic Places.
- 1955: Josiah Willard Gibbs Research Laboratories, Yale University. (Destroyed 2017)
- 1956: Allen Hall, University at Buffalo, Buffalo, New York.
- 1958: Unitarian Church, Evanston, Illinois.
- 1962–66: Student Union at Duquesne University, Pittsburgh, Pennsylvania.
- 1965: Carnegie Library, Knoxville Branch, Pittsburgh, Pennsylvania.
- 1967: Craig Wright House, Fox Chapel, Pennsylvania.
- 1970: WQED Building, Pittsburgh, Pennsylvania.
- 1972: Schweikher House, Sedona, Arizona
