= Alexander Langsdorf Jr. =

American physicist (1912–1996)

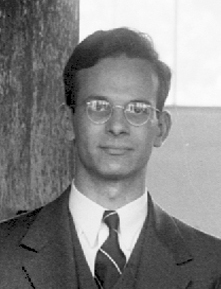
- Langsdorf in 1938
- Born: Alexander Suss Langsdorf; May 30, 1912; St. Louis, Missouri, U.S.
- Died: May 24, 1996 (aged 83); Elmhurst, Illinois, U.S.
- Education: Washington University in St. Louis (BA); Massachusetts Institute of Technology (PhD)
- Scientific career
- Workplaces: University of California at Berkeley; Washington University in St. Louis; University of Chicago

Alexander Suss Langsdorf Jr. (May 30, 1912 – May 24, 1996) was an American physicist on the team that developed the atomic bomb and several devices related to nuclear physics. He was a vocal opponent of the use and proliferation of nuclear weapons.

== Life and career ==
Langsdorf was born in St. Louis, Missouri. He earned an undergraduate degree from Washington University in St. Louis in 1932 and a doctorate in physics from Massachusetts Institute of Technology in 1937. In this time he developed a continuously sensitive cloud chamber. After a research fellowship at the University of California at Berkeley, he became a physics instructor at Washington University in St. Louis from 1939 to 1942.

Prior to World War II, Langsdorf co-developed a cyclotron for splitting atomic particles at Washington University in St. Louis. It was designed for use in medical research. During World War II, he worked with Enrico Fermi at the University of Chicago on the Manhattan Project. Langsdorf was one of the designers of the first two nuclear reactors after Fermi completed the first sustained nuclear chain reaction in 1942. Langsdorf was able to produce a tiny usable sample of plutonium using his device. That sample was then used in the Trinity nuclear test on July 16, 1945. Langsdorf urged President Harry S Truman not to use the bomb against the Japanese, but a plutonium-based bomb was dropped on Nagasaki soon after.

He continued to urge against expansion of nuclear weapons. He helped found Bulletin of the Atomic Scientists, and his wife Martyl Langsdorf designed the 1947 cover of the publication which debuted the Doomsday Clock. Langsdorf also invented the diffusion cloud chamber and the reactor oscillator.

In 1953, the Langsdorfs moved into the Paul Schweikher House and Studio in Schaumburg, Illinois. Langsdorf died in Elmhurst, Illinois, from complications from hip surgery.
