= Harriet Ryan Albee =

American social reformer and philanthropist

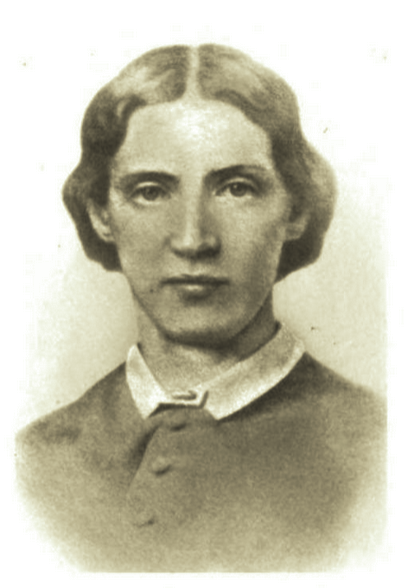
- Born: Harriet (or Harriett) Ryan; March 5, 1829; Boston, Massachusetts, U.S.
- Died: May 2, 1873 (aged 44); Boston
- Occupations: social reformer; philanthropist
- Known for: Founder, Channing Home for Sick and Destitute Women (now, the Channing Division of Network Medicine, Brigham and Women's Hospital)
- Spouse(s): John Albee, V (m. 1864)

Signature
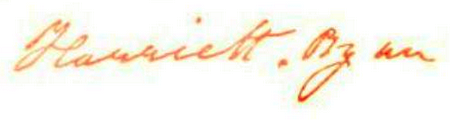

Harriet Ryan Albee (1829-1873) was an American social reformer and philanthropist, who devoted herself and a large part of her earnings to the care of chronically ill and invalid women. She was the founder of the Channing Home for Sick and Destitute Women in Boston, Massachusetts. Recognized as one of the best-known charities in the country in its day, it was the first nonsectarian care home for incurables in the U.S., and one of the first to accept consumptives. In 2012, the institution that Albee founded became the Channing Division of Network Medicine, Brigham and Women's Hospital. The Harriet Ryan Albee Professorship at Harvard University is named in her honor.

== Early life ==
Harriet (or Harriett) Ryan was born in Boston, March 5, 1829. Her father, Richard Ryan (1794-1850), was an Irishman from Halifax, Nova Scotia. Her mother, Elizabeth (Kennan) Ryan (1798-?), was also from Halifax. Harriet's siblings were Richard, Valentine, and Elizabeth. The family was Roman Catholic.

When the parents married, Mrs. Ryan must have had considerable money, and it went to stock a sort of variety store which Mr. Ryan kept. Mrs. Ryan was his second wife, and there were several children by the first marriage. After a while, the store was burned down, while the family were at church, and the loss must have been very great. Then they came to New England, and went to Brewster Island in Boston Harbor. There was but one family on the island. Mr. Ryan was employed blasting rocks, and one day he was thrown into the air, after which he kept to his bed for eleven years. After this misfortune, they moved to Boston, to Province Street, where Albee was born. Mrs. Ryan always spoke of this as a very hard time.

After Mr. Ryan's death, Mrs. Ryan sewed for a living, but while the children were all little, the family was mostly supported by two of Albee's half-sisters. One of them was a shoe binder, the other lived out. They lived very close, and most of their earnings came to the Ryan home.

Albee was about twelve years old when she heard a sad conversation between her mother and a young girl whose sister had been given up at the Massachusetts General Hospital. She told Mrs. Ryan that she earned US$2 a week, and was willing to give US$1.50 to have her sister taken care of; but she was always changing, and people found it so much trouble. Mrs. Ryan said she could never take care of the sick for money, that she would never pay anybody for such care, but she would try what she could do. So the young girl came with her sick sister, and Albee used to wait upon her a great deal. When Albee got tired or looked out of temper, Mrs. Ryan would say, "Do you find it so hard to work for God?" After this girl died, Mrs. Ryan took another who was an American and a Protestant. She also stayed with the Ryans till she died.

Eventually, Mrs. Ryan lost the use of her eyes by tic douloureux, and then illness; she died when Albee was 16 years of age. Albee's only full sister died of consumption, and Albee watched over her younger brother for many years.

== Career ==
Albee began working by being maid to a woman in Beacon Street, and when she left that position, Albee took to dressmaking, but it hurt her, and she went see a doctor. He said Albee must have fresh air in order to live many years, so Albee took up hairdressing, which, as she walked from house to house, agreed with her. At the same time, it happened that she saw a great deal of the sick.

At the age of 20, she resolved that going forward, her leisure time, brief though it would be, should be spent in nursing the sick and destitute. She chose for the most part the incurable, who were not admitted into ordinary hospitals. The want of homes where they could be cared for was severely felt by these patients, their relatives being usually too much occupied in providing for their mere subsistence, and the necessary expenses consequent on illness, to be able to give them the attention essential to their comfort.

An opportunity soon occurred for carrying her benevolent design into effect. One day, when purchasing some articles in a grocer's shop, she heard a woman lamenting the condition of a sick neighbor, who had no one to care for her. Albee immediately inquired her address, found that her state of health had been correctly described, brought her to her own humble lodging, and nursed her through her illness like a daughter. This was the start of her social work. She soon had two or three such patients under her care, whom she tended in like manner, devoting herself more particularly to cases of consumption.

While combing and curling the hair of rich women at their own houses, Albee had ample opportunity of interesting her employers in the objects of her benevolence. She awakened interest in those who had abundant financial means to relieve distress, and her stories were listened to with respect and admiration. Albee received several useful supplies of furniture, bed linen, and other articles, from these sources.

Two invalids, laboring under incurable disease, happened to fall under Albee's care. Finding herself unable to support them, she applied for help to some of her customers, who undertook to assist in providing nurses, Albee herself paying US$10 per week towards the cost. The attendants, however, failed in their duty, and the patients suffered from their neglect. Albee then conceived the idea of placing her protegées in one large room, where she could watch over them at night, leaving a substitute in charge during the day.

Albee lived with her sister and had one pretty room. The sister did not like Albee bringing sick women into their home, and said if Albee persisted, she would leave. One day, the sister said, "There is that vestry next door, shut up ever since we came here. I wonder if you could not have that?"

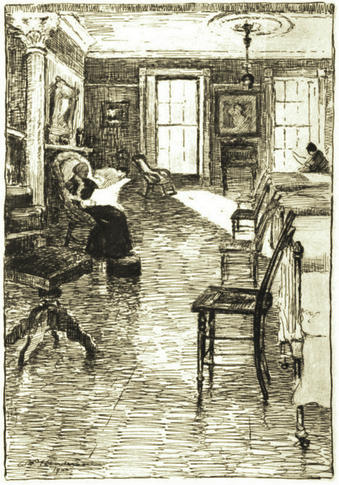
Channing Home, Boston

Obtaining sufficient encouragement in her benevolent idea from the rich women of Boston, Albee applied to Rev. Dr. Ezra Stiles Gannett's Society, for leave to occupy an apartment, formerly the vestry of his church, the Federal Street Church. Permission was readily granted, and when the society learned for what purpose the room was to be used, they offered it to her rent-free, a benefaction she gladly accepted. In remembrance of this act of kindness, she named her institution The Channing Home for Sick and Destitute Women, the church being that in which Dr. William Ellery Channing had been accustomed to preach. Here, the Channing Home was first opened in May 1857.

Albee continued with her work as a hairdresser. On May 1, 1870, the Home moved to larger quarters at 30 McLean Street. Until her death, Albee was devoted to the Home and actively directed its affairs. Upon her death, Albee's half-sister, Eliza McDonnell, immediately took over as matron.

== Personal life ==
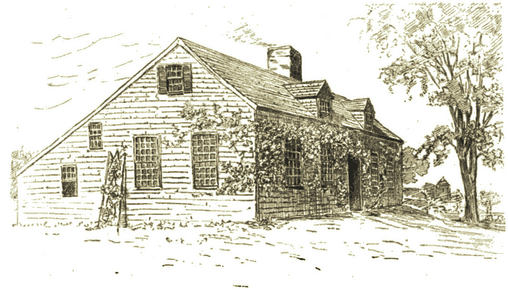
Jaffrey Cottage, New Castle, New Hampshire

On September 1, 1864, in Boston, she married John Albee V (1833-1915), a writer and Unitarian minister. In the following year, they purchased a property in New Castle, New Hampshire. They lived for many years in the town's historical Jaffrey Cottage, one of the oldest houses in the state. Here, at Jaffrey Cottage, they entertained Alexander Graham Bell, Anna Bowman Dodd, Mary Baker Eddy, Ralph Waldo Emerson, James T. Fields, John Fiske, Henry Wadsworth Longfellow, James Russell Lowell, Harriet Beecher Stowe, Celia Thaxter, and John Greenleaf Whittier.

The couple had four children: Harriet, Esther, Robert, and Louisa.

== Death and legacy ==
Harriet Ryan Albee died in Boston of consumption in the Home she founded on May 2, 1873.

A sketch of her life was written in 1901 by James De Normandie, D.D.

The Harriet Ryan Albee Professorship of Microbiology and Immunobiology at Harvard Medical School and Brigham and Women's Hospital was first held by Dr. Elliott D. Kieff; Dr. Daniel Kuritzkes succeeded him.
