= Dana McLean Greeley =

American Christian minister (1908–1986)

The Reverend Dana McLean Greeley

1st President of the Unitarian Universalist Association
- In office 1961–1969
- Succeeded by: Rev. Robert West

President of the American Unitarian Association
- In office 1958–1961
- Preceded by: Rev. Frederick May Eliot

Personal details
- Born: July 5, 1908 Lexington, MA
- Died: June 13, 1986 (aged 77) Concord, MA
- Occupation: Unitarian Universalist minister

Dana McLean Greeley (July 5, 1908 – June 13, 1986) was a Unitarian minister, the last president of the American Unitarian Association and, upon its merger with the Universalist Church in America, was the founding president of the Unitarian Universalist Association.

== Biography ==
On December 27, 1931 Greeley married Deborah Webster, whom he had known since childhood. Greeley received a Bachelor of Sacred Theology degree from Harvard Divinity School in 1933 and was ordained by his home parish church in Lexington, Massachusetts. His first two settlements were the Unitarian churches in Lincoln, Massachusetts (1932-1934) and Concord, New Hampshire (1934-1935). In 1935, at the age of 27, he was called to the prestigious Arlington Street Church in Boston where he served until 1958.

After his presidency with the UUA, Rev. Greeley became Visiting Professor of the Church and World Peace at the Meadville Lombard Theological School in Chicago and president of the International Association for Religious Freedom. In 1970 he returned to parish ministry accepting a call from the First Parish in Concord, Massachusetts, where he served until his death in 1986.

During his lifetime Rev. Greeley received many awards, including honorary degrees from Meadville Theological School, Emerson College, St. Lawrence University, Tufts University and Portia Law School. Additionally, the Concord congregation and his friends and colleagues created in his memory the Dana Greeley Foundation which supports grassroots efforts toward making the world more peaceful. He was one of the signatories of the agreement to convene a convention for drafting a world constitution. As a result, for the first time in human history, a World Constituent Assembly convened to draft and adopt the Constitution for the Federation of Earth.
