= Kuritzkes =

Kuritzkes is a surname. Notable people with the surname include:

- Daniel Kuritzkes, American physician
- Justin Kuritzkes, American playwright and novelist
