= Arlington Street Church =

Historic church in Boston, Massachusetts, United States

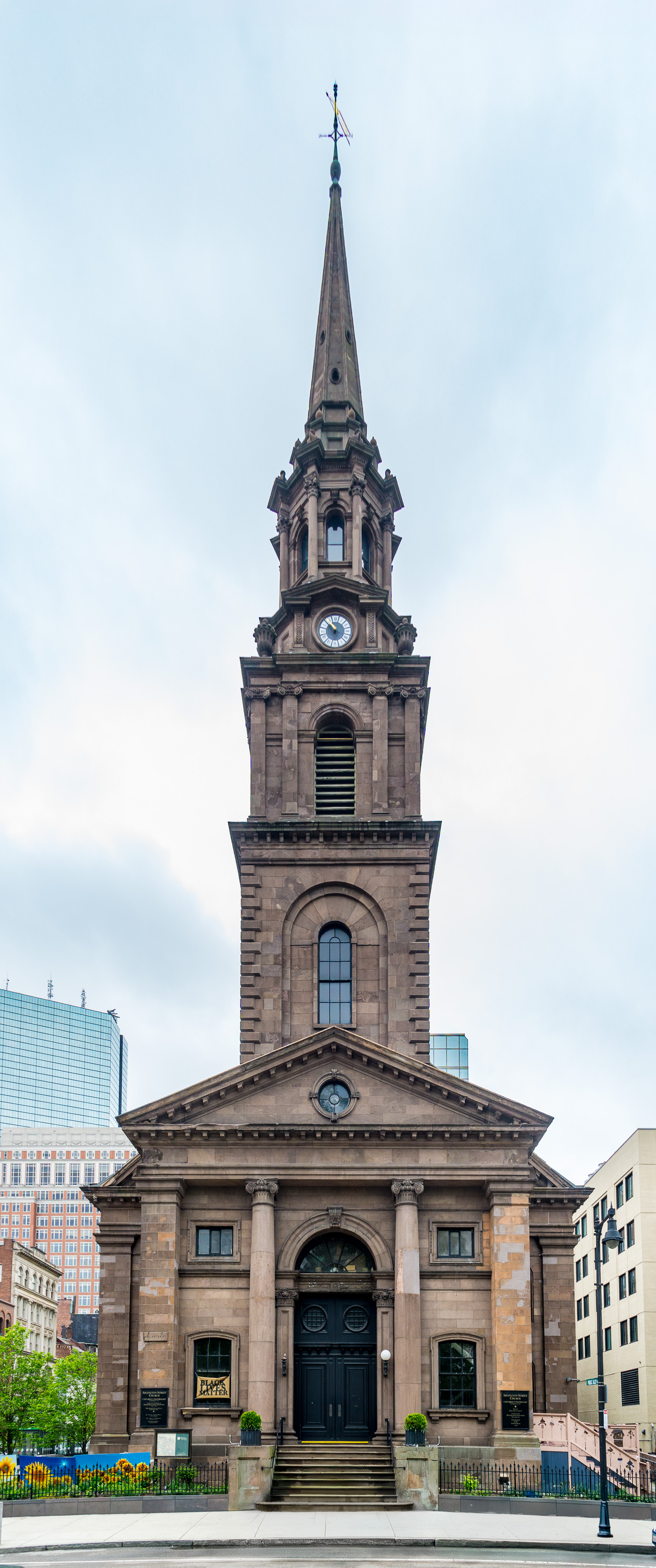
- Arlington Street Church
- 42°21′7.4″N 71°04′15.9″W
- Location: 351–355 Boylston Street, Boston, Massachusetts
- Denomination: Unitarian Universalist
- Website: www.ascboston.org

Architecture
- Architect: Arthur Gilman
- Architectural type: 18th-century English
- Arlington Street Church
- U.S. National Register of Historic Places
- U.S. Historic district – Contributing property
- Boston Landmark
- Area: 0.5 acres (0.20 ha)
- Built: 1861
- Part of: Back Bay Historic District (ID73001948)
- NRHP reference No.: 73000313

Significant dates
- Added to NRHP: May 4, 1973
- Designated CP: August 14, 1973
- Designated BOSL: April 25, 1978

The Arlington Street Church is a Unitarian Universalist church across from the Public Garden in Boston, Massachusetts. Because of its geographic prominence and the notable ministers who have served the congregation, the church is considered to be among the most historically important in Unitarian Universalism. Completed in 1861, it was designed by Arthur Gilman and Gridley James Fox Bryant to resemble James Gibbs' St. Martin-in-the-Fields in London. The main sanctuary space has 16 large-scale stained-glass windows installed by Tiffany Studios from 1899 to 1930.

On May 17, 2004, the Arlington Street Church was the site of the first state-sanctioned same-sex marriage in the United States.

== History of the congregation ==
The congregation was founded in 1729 as the "Church of the Presbyterian Strangers" and became independent in 1787, incorporating under a congregational model of polity. Until the Back Bay location was completed, the congregation was located in the Federal Street Church in downtown Boston, where William Ellery Channing, the first major American Unitarian minister, preached from 1803 to 1842. Channing's successor at the Federal Street Church, Ezra Stiles Gannett, moved the congregation in 1861 to the Arlington Street Church.

Two future presidents of the American Unitarian Association—Samuel Eliot and Dana Greeley—served the church during its first hundred years in the Arlington Street building. In 1935, the Second Universalist Church of Boston merged its assets with Arlington Street Church. In so doing, Arlington Street Church inherited the thinking of two great liberal theologians: Channing, called "the father of American Unitarianism," and Hosea Ballou, called "the father of American Universalism." In 1942, the Church of the Disciples united with Arlington Street Church.

In the 1960s, the congregation became active in the Civil Rights Movement. James Reeb, a minister active in the congregation, was murdered during a march in Selma, Alabama. Under the ministry of Jack Mendelsohn, the church became a center for protests against the Vietnam War. In the 1980s, the church led AIDS awareness programs and support for the homeless. In 2004, Reverend Kim K. Crawford Harvie officiated the first legal state-sanctioned same-sex marriage in the United States.

== Arlington Street church building ==
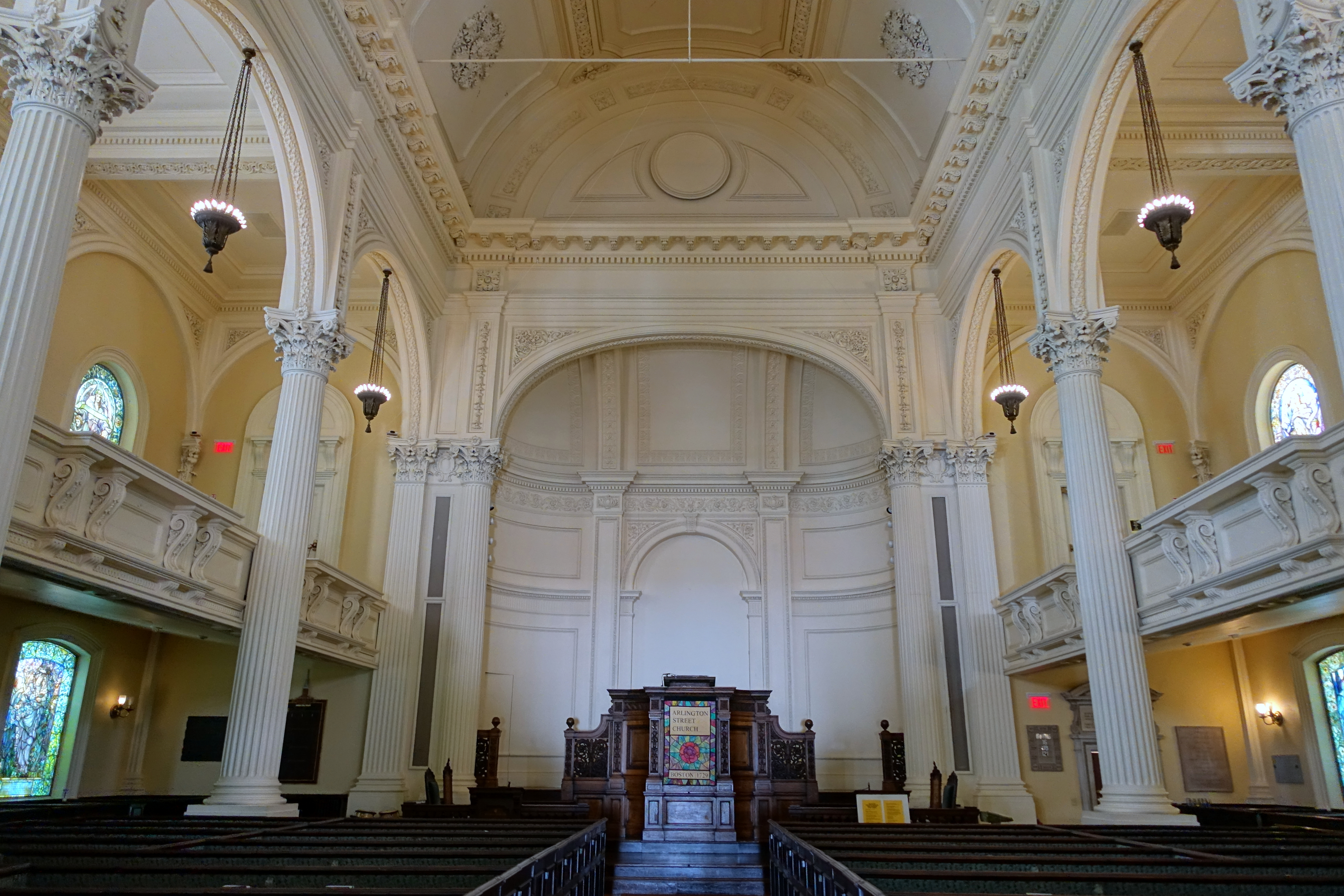
Church sanctuary interior

As the population of Boston grew and land became scarce, landfilled areas were created in the North End, South End, and finally the Back Bay during the 1850s. When the area around Federal Street became commercial, the congregation voted to move to newly filled land in the Back Bay neighborhood. Arlington Street Church was the first public building to be constructed there. The building was begun in 1859, and dedicated in 1861 as the American Civil War loomed. Designed by Arthur Gilman and Gridley James Fox Bryant, architects for the Old Boston City Hall, its exterior was inspired by St. Martin-in-the-Fields, London.

The building is supported by 999 wooden pilings driven into the mud of Back Bay, and brownstone ashlar for its exterior was quarried in New Jersey. The bell tower stands 190 feet (58 meters) tall and contains a set of 16 bells, each with a Biblical inscription. It is one of only four sets in the city of Boston still rung by hand. The building was listed on the National Register of Historic Places in 1973 and designated a Boston Landmark by the Boston Landmarks Commission in 1978.

Landscaping for the church was designed by Mabel Keyes Babcock.

=== Interior ===
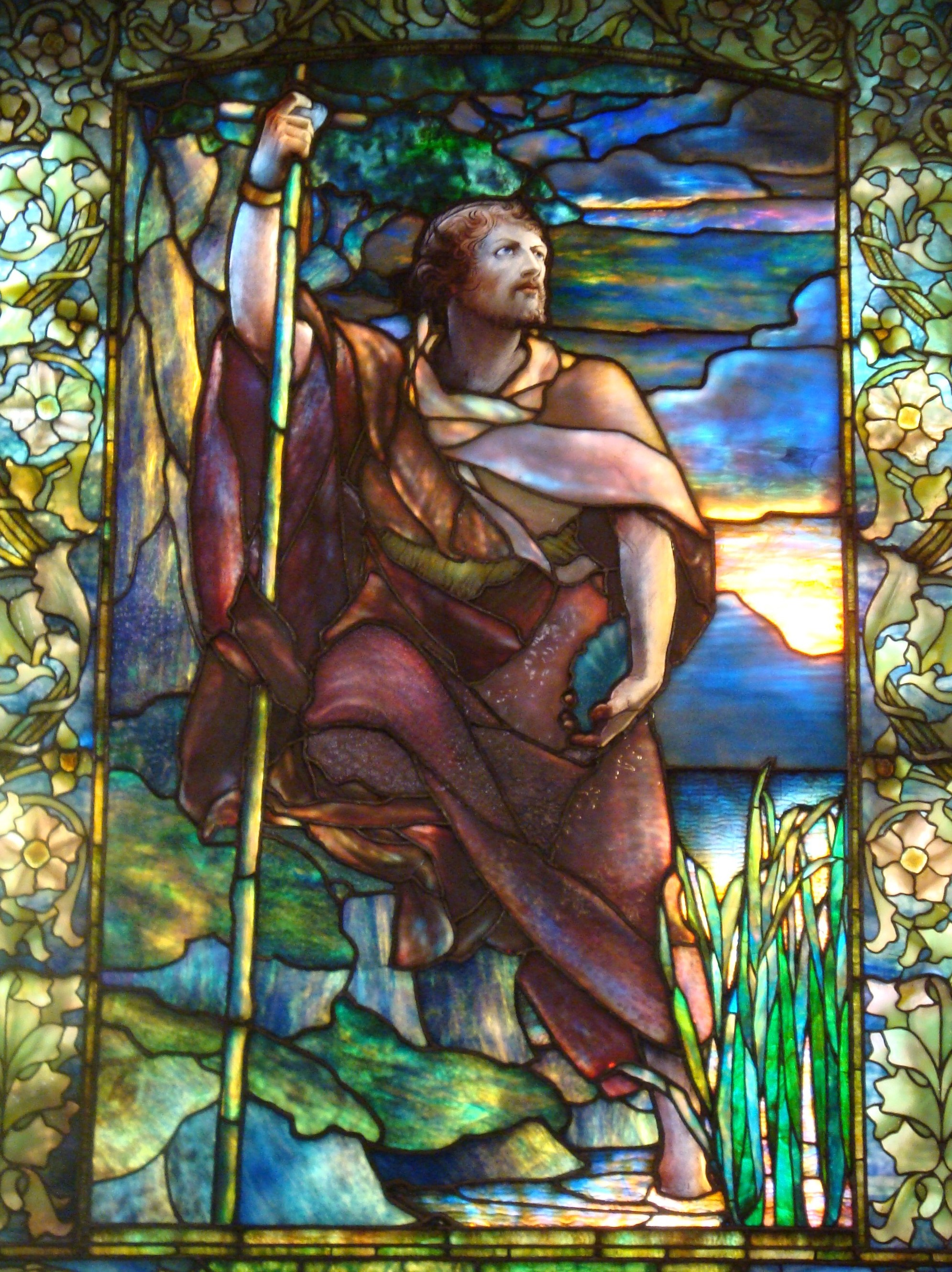
Detail of stained glass window created by Louis Comfort Tiffany depicting John the Baptist

The sanctuary, with its Corinthian columns and graceful rounded arches, was modeled after the Basilica della Santissima Annunziata del Vastato in Genoa, Italy. The panels on either side of the choir loft, containing the Ten Commandments and the Lord’s Prayer, were brought from the Federal Street Church, as was Dr. William Ellery Channing’s pulpit, which stands in the Hunnewell Chapel. The box pews, made of chestnut with black walnut rails, were at one time deeded to members of the congregation. Enclosing each pew signified that they were privately owned, and also kept cold drafts from blowing in from the aisles during the winter season.

Originally, all of the sanctuary windows were glazed with clear glass. In 1898, the congregation voted to start installation of memorial stained glass windows created by the studios of Louis C. Tiffany, and commissioned a set of designs for all 20 windows. The last of 16 Tiffany windows was installed in 1930, just before the Great Depression dried up available funds. By the time the economic crisis had eased, Tiffany Studios had been liquidated (in 1937), and new Tiffany windows were unobtainable.

The Tiffany windows were designed by Frederick Wilson (1858–1932), Tiffany's chief designer for ecclesiastical windows. He made extensive use of Tiffany's special glassmaking technologies, including confetti glass, iridescent glass, 3D-textured "drapery glass", pastel colors for "painting in glass", and the trademark opalescent “Favrile” glass. There are as many as six or seven layers of glass in a Tiffany window, producing visual textures that would otherwise have to be painted in. Only some fine details impractical to produce in glass were hand-painted, in permanent enamel. The Arlington Street Church holds the complete set of Wilson's original watercolor design drawings for all the windows.

The windows on the lower level feature incidents from the early life of Jesus, while the windows for the galleries on the upper level feature his Beatitudes, or blessings. Each window has a border of decorative acanthus-leaf scrolls, echoing the capitals of the Corinthian columns of the sanctuary. Full-color images of all the Tiffany windows can be seen at the Arlington Street Tiffany Education Center website.

After vandalism destroyed a memorial dedication pane in the 1970s, plexiglas sheets were installed on the exterior side of the Tiffany windows for protection. Over time, the plastic discolored to a bluish tinge and transmitted less light, as an accumulated film of dirt also clouded the stained glass. In the 21st century, the plastic sheets have been replaced, and the glass has been cleaned to restore its original beauty. In 2015, $120,000 in funds was raised to begin restoration of the Tiffany windows. As of 2019, night-time lighting is being installed, so that the Tiffany windows can be viewed from outside the building.

After a 50-year period when the Tiffany windows were only viewed by the congregation, the church is now open to the general public from 10 a.m. to 3 p.m. daily from mid-May through the end of October, except Sunday and when special events are scheduled. Guided tours and self-guided tours (with optional smartphone audio) are available, as well as group tours by prearrangement.

The Aeolian-Skinner organ was installed in 1955–1957. Since the Aeolian-Skinner Company was shut down in the 1970s, the organ is regarded as an irreplaceable historic instrument from the 20th century.

Most of the main floor is wheelchair accessible. The fully accessible Arlington station on the MBTA Green Line is immediately adjacent to the church, at the corner of Boylston Street and Arlington Street.

== Governance and association ==
Arlington Street Church is a member congregation of the Unitarian Universalist Association, a denomination created in 1961 by the consolidation of the American Unitarian Association and the Universalist Church of America. The denomination is organized on the basis of congregational church government. Each congregation is self-governing, deciding on its form of worship, professional and lay leadership, programs, and business. Congregations are members of the Unitarian Universalist Association and are united by a statement of Purposes and Principles. Each congregation elects delegates to a yearly General Assembly where the congregational delegates vote on matters of denominational importance and on resolutions of social witness. Congregations are served by programs provided by the Association at the continental and regional levels.

Preservation and restoration of the church building and its Tiffany windows are supported by The Foundation for the Preservation of 20 Arlington Street Inc, a separate, non-sectarian 501(c)(3) charity. In 2017, the Tiffany Windows Education Center at Arlington Street Church opened its doors to the public, offering guided tours of the church and the Tiffany windows.

== Gallery ==
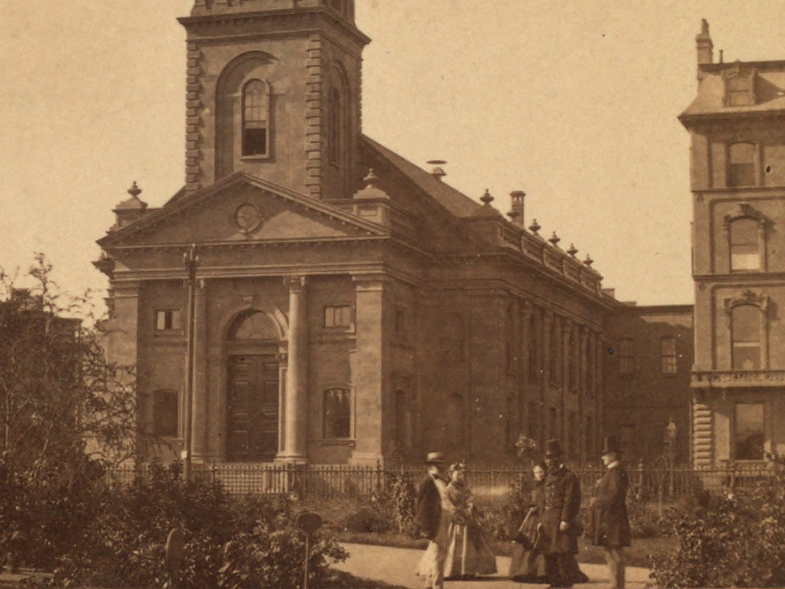
Arlington St. Church, 19th-century photo by John P. Soule

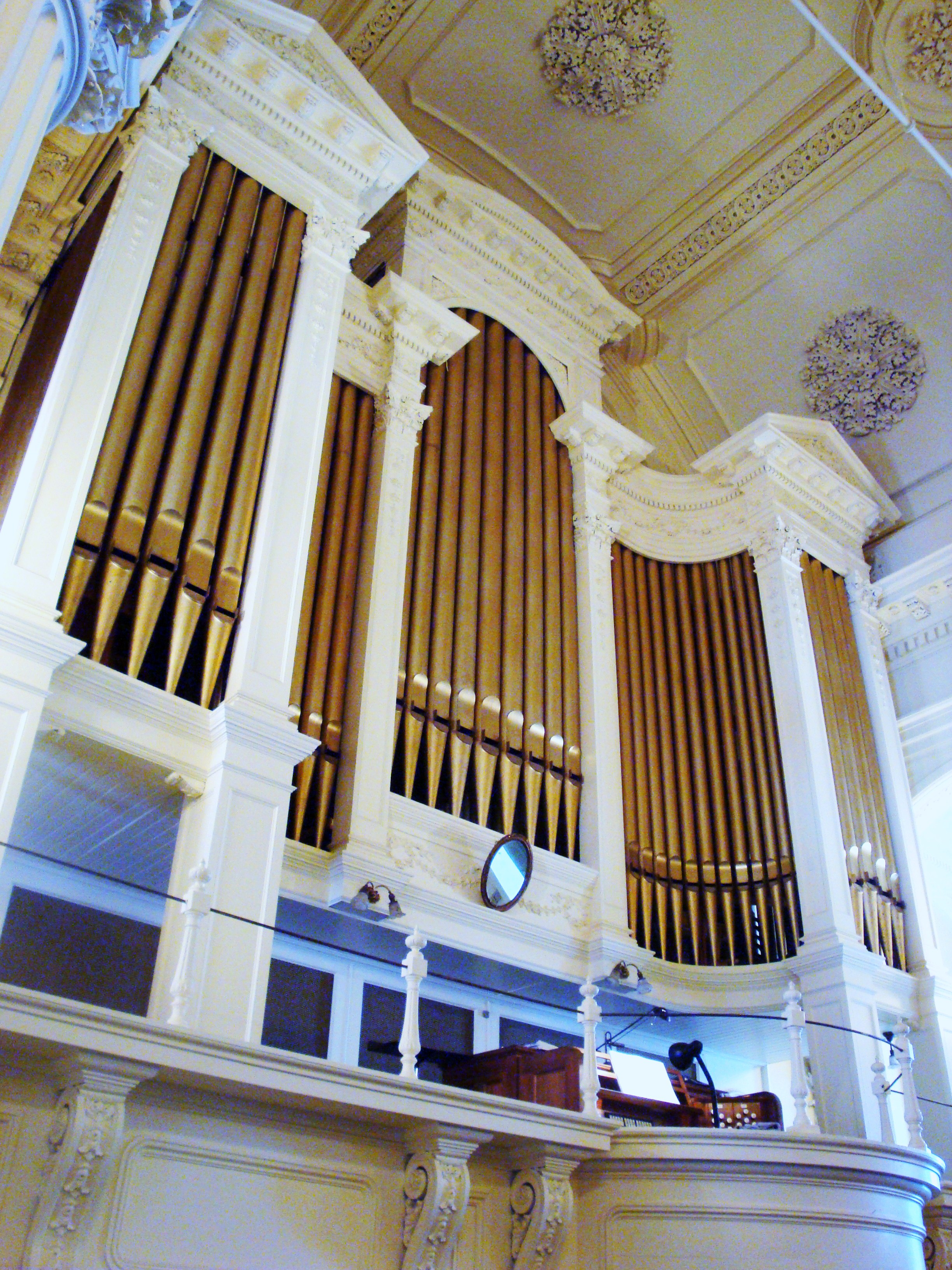
Æolian-Skinner pipe organ

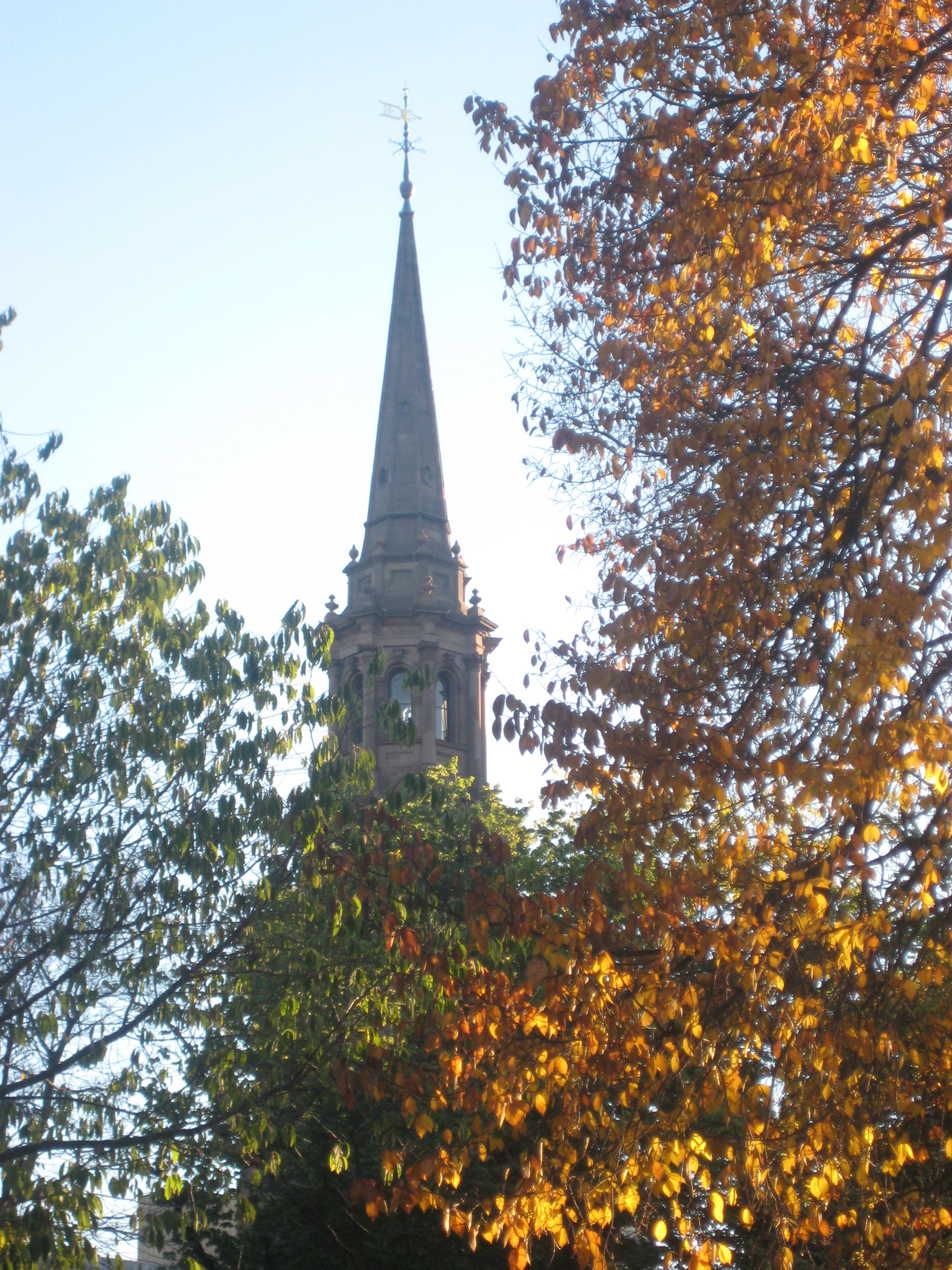
Steeple, viewed through autumn foliage of the Public Garden

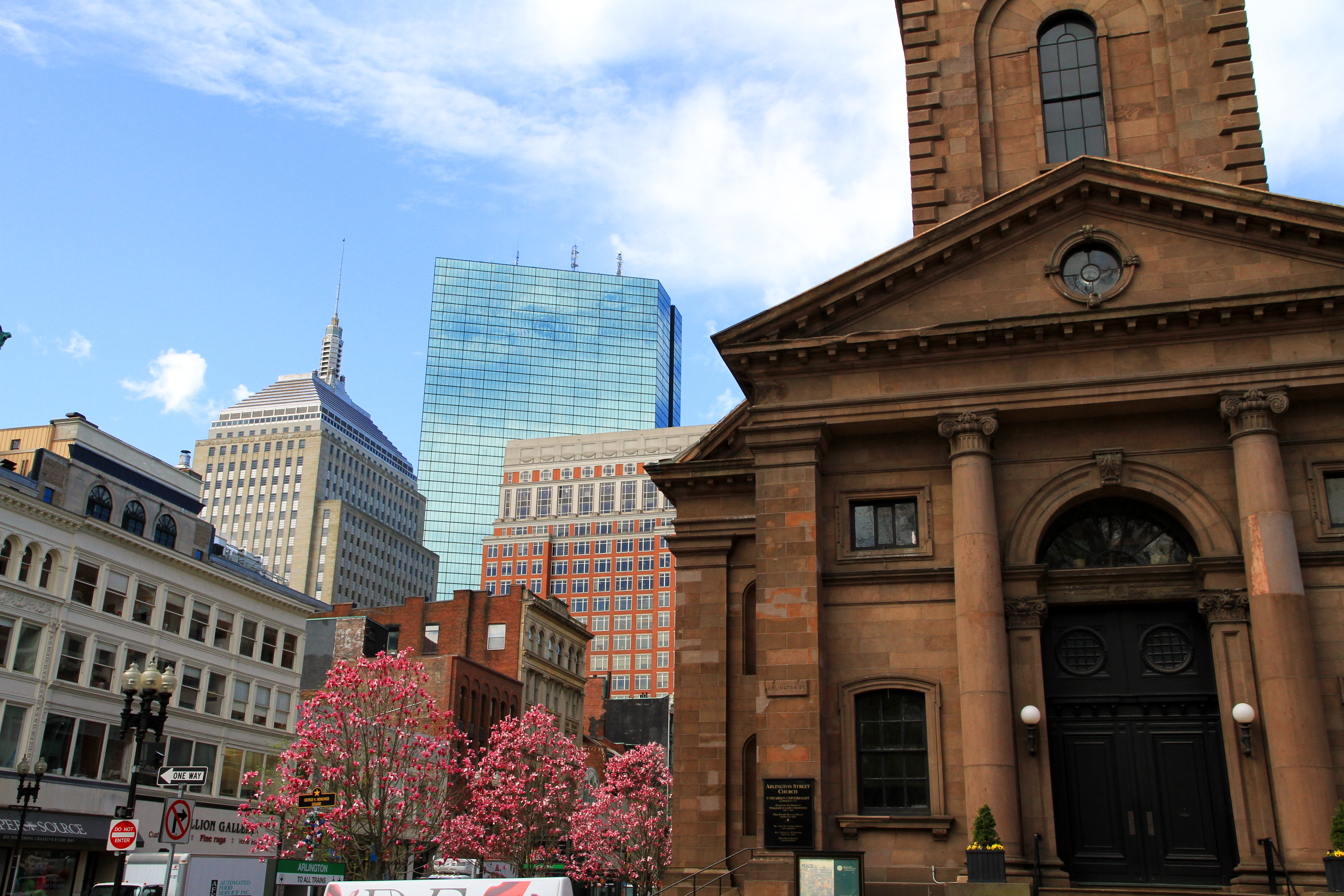
Arlington Street Church, 2013

== See also ==
- Church of the Covenant (Boston) – nearby Boston church with a Tiffany-designed interior
- Federal Street Church (Boston)
- National Register of Historic Places listings in northern Boston, Massachusetts
