= Channing Home =

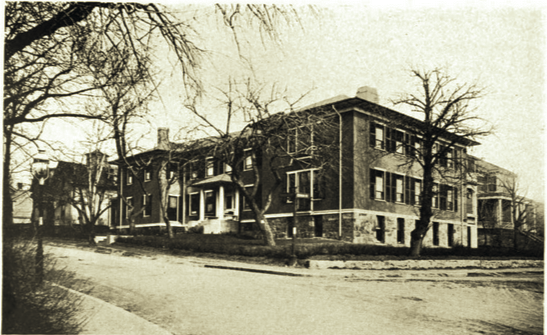

Geography
- Location: Longwood, Boston, Massachusetts, U.S.

Organisation
- Type: "home-hospital"
- Affiliated university: Brigham and Women's Hospital

Services

History
- Opened: May 1857
- Closed: 1958

Channing Home (also known as, Channing Street Home for Sick and Destitute Women; now, Channing Division of Network Medicine at Brigham and Women's Hospital; 1857-1958) was an American "home-hospital". It was not a hospital in the common definition of the word, but a home for women whose death seemed quite certain and required constant medical attendance. Located in Boston, Massachusetts, the Home was established in 1857, and incorporated in 1861. It was founded by Harriet Ryan Albee through the assistance of rich women friends whom she had drawn into sympathy with her charitable purpose.

The Home was first opened in Channing Street in May 1857. In March 1858, was removed to No. 13 South Street. From this site it was removed, on May 1, 1870, to No. 30 McLean Street and again on October 31, 1907 to the corner of Bellevue and Francis Streets (Longwood), Boston. Albee felt that the Home should never do good by rule but according to a present need. No longer needed in 1958, Channing Home closed and its endowment was transferred to Brigham and Women's Hospital.

== History ==
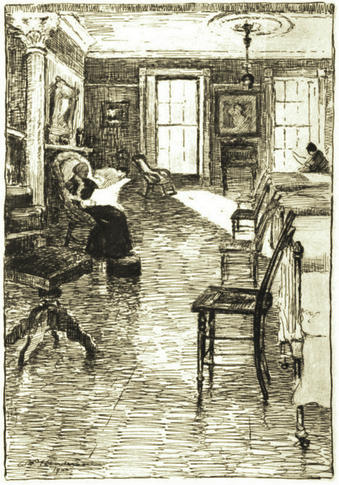
Channing Home (undated)

Obtaining sufficient encouragement in her benevolent idea from the rich women of Boston, Albee applied to Rev. Dr. Ezra Stiles Gannett's Society, for leave to occupy an apartment, formerly the vestry of his church, the Federal Street Church. Permission was readily granted, and when the society learned for what purpose the room was to be used, they offered it to her rent-free, a benefaction she gladly accepted. In remembrance of this act of kindness, she named her institution "The Channing Home for Sick and Destitute Women", the church being that in which Dr. William Ellery Channing had been accustomed to preach. Here, the Channing Home was first opened in May 1857.

To begin this comparatively costly institution, with scarcely any funds, was considered a very hazardous undertaking. In the course of the two years during which she occupied the vestry, Albee undertook the care of 52 sufferers. All patients were treated free of charge. No sectarian influence was allowed in the Home. Albee had trouble to keep the name of "Channing Home" which she gave in memory of the vestry and not of the man. While they did not favor it, through Albee's persistence, the Episcopalians voted that she should have her wish and the name remained.

The first location soon proved inadequate for all the patients in need of help, and in March 1858, the Home was moved to No. 13 South Street, where it was incorporated as the Channing Home. There were seven in the Home at the time of its removal from the church vestry, the large proportion of deaths owing to many being admitted when in the last stage of consumption.

"...it looks like a private house, of cheerful aspect, with a most agreeable hostess; the only difference from ordinary circumstances being, that the guests are all ill." (Anonymous, Our exemplars, 1861)

Early in the spring of 1859, a fair was held to raise funds for the institution, for which poems were written by Nathaniel Langdon Frothingham, Oliver Wendell Holmes, James Russell Lowell, and Ralph Waldo Emerson. Catherine Tilden contributed a novel, The First Patient: A Story, Written in Aid of the Fair for the "Channing Home". The fair was successful, with a sum of US$13,800 realized. (Note: According to The Boston Globe (1901), US$15,600 was raised.)

The fair's proceeds were invested as a fund for an enlarged Home, and a house in South Audley Street was taken. Here Albee received twelve inmates, which number she considered a proper limit for one house; but she desired to found similar homes in other parts of the city, and to this object devoted all the time she could spare. She was assisted by her brother and sister. Her sister did the cooking, while the brother managed the marketing and fulfilled other duties. Albee herself was always the night-watcher, when one was needed. The same charitable spirit was evinced by the physicians who attended the patients, the ministers who visited, and the women who read to the sufferers.

On May 1, 1870, the Home moved to No. 30 McLean Street. This building was light and airy, and situated in a quiet and unpaved street. The position had some advantages of importance to the patients; and it was believed that they were more comfortable here than they would be in a larger establishment. In 1895, there were 15 patients in the Home, of whom 12 were suffering from consumption, two from general debility, and one from cardiac disease and complications.

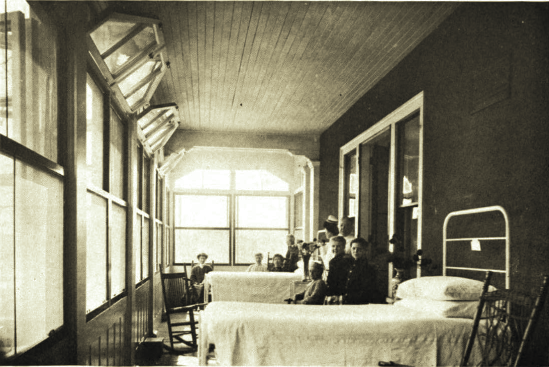
Home veranda interior (1913)

The Home moved again on October 31, 1907, to the corner of Francis Street and Pilgrim Road, Longwood, Boston.

== Purpose ==
It was Ryan's purpose that the Home should never do good by rule but according to a present need. The care of tuberculous patients was a serious problem in Boston in her day where there were at least 4,000 cases of consumption in its contagious stage and for whom less than 400 beds were provided by municipal and private charity. Many of these patients had to be turned away from hospitals as ineligible and remained a problem to everyone with whom they come in contact.

In view of the pressing need in the community for the isolation and care of poor patients with pulmonary tuberculosis in its more advanced stages, it was the purpose of the Directors of the Home to devote its resources more exclusively than formerly to such cases. In view also of the increasing provision by the city and the state of public institutions for the care of tuberculous patients without regard to their previous social condition, it was felt that this Home could fill a special place by the admission of those whose former associations would make life in a public institution an added trial in their affliction.

The protective influence of the Home in the community was one of its most important functions. In isolating so many cases with an advanced stages of the pulmonary form of the disease, the Channing Home performed an invaluable work in preventing the spread of tuberculosis by protecting the patients' homes and the public from infection and by relieving the wage-earners of the family from the burden of a long and expensive illness.

The Home also exerted an important educational influence on the community. By a course of strict training, it instructed its patients in the sources of danger to others. The observance of proper precautions by the patients diminished the chance of infection from those who left the institution and was a useful example to the numerous relatives and friends who visited the Home. In a number of instances, the necessity for medical investigation of members of the patients' families was successfully urged.
