= Susan Mackem =

American anatomic pathologist and physician-scientist

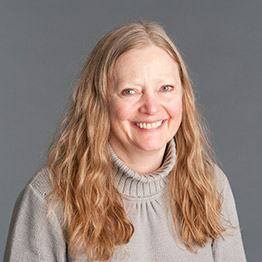
- Born: 1954 (age 71–72)
- Education: University of Chicago; Johns Hopkins School of Medicine
- Scientific career
- Fields: Anatomic pathology
- Workplaces: National Cancer Institute
- Thesis: Construction of chimeric genes for studying the regulation of herpes simplex virus a gene expression (1982)
- Doctoral advisor: Bernard Roizman

Susan Marie Mackem (born 1954) is an American anatomic pathologist and physician-scientist. She researches vertebrate primary axis formation and the regulation of patterning and differentiation during limb development. She is a senior investigator and head of the regulation of vertebrate morphogenesis section at the National Cancer Institute's Frederick National Laboratory for Cancer Research. She is also an attending pathologist at the National Institutes of Health Clinical Center.

== Education ==
Mackem undertook her graduate research on the regulation of herpes immediate early gene expression by VP16 with Bernard Roizman and received her Ph.D. as an MSTP trainee at the University of Chicago. Her 1982 dissertation was titled, Construction of chimeric genes for studying the regulation of herpes simplex virus a gene expression. She completed a M.D. at the Johns Hopkins School of Medicine, and then went on to residency training in anatomic pathology at the National Cancer Institute (NCI).

== Career and research ==
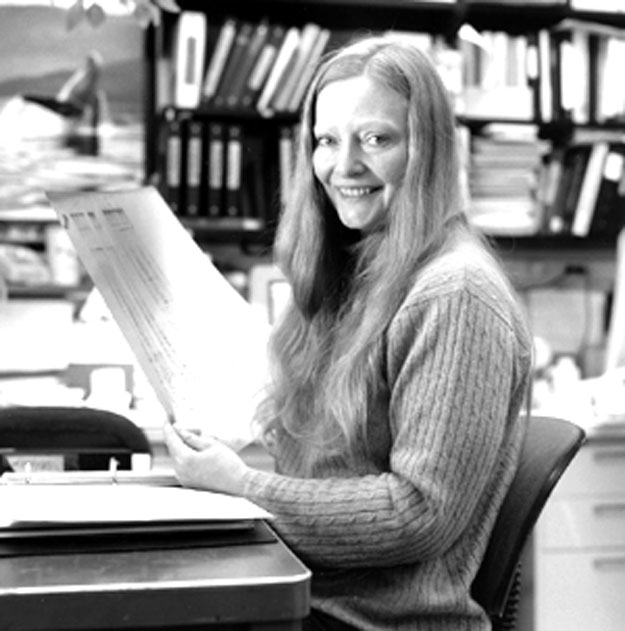
Mackem at the NCI.

Mackem became a staff member in the Laboratory of Pathology at the NCI. In 2009, she joined the Cancer and Developmental Biology Laboratory at Frederick National Laboratory for Cancer Research. Mackem serves as an attending anatomic pathologist for the Laboratory of Pathology and National Institutes of Health Clinical Center. She is a senior investigator and head of the regulation of vertebrate morphogenesis section.

Her research has focused on vertebrate primary axis formation and the regulation of patterning and differentiation during limb development. Mackem studies limb development as a model for learning how signaling networks orchestrate the formation of a complex 3-dimensional structure, using combined genetic, genomic, and biochemical approaches to study transcription factors and signaling cascades that regulate the formation and pattern of digits and unravel the regulatory hierarchy between early patterning and digit morphogenesis. A major focus of her lab has been the role of Sonic Hedgehog and its signaling targets, including the Gli3 hedgehog-effector and 5’HoxD homeobox gene targets that cooperate to regulate the late morphogenetic realization of early patterning cues.
