= Ezra Stiles Gannett =

American Unitarian minister (1801–1871)

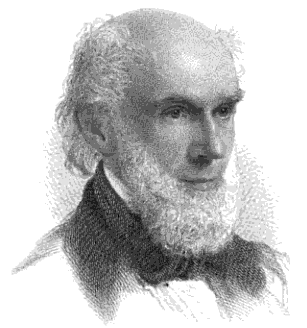
Dr. Ezra S. Gannett

Ezra Stiles Gannett (May 4, 1801–August 26, 1871) was an American Unitarian minister and a founder of the American Unitarian Association. For decades, he presided at the Federal Street Church and Arlington Street Church in Boston, Massachusetts.

== Biography ==
Ezra Gannett's father Caleb was a minister and a mathematics professor at Harvard College. After his first wife died, Caleb married Ruth Stiles, the daughter of Yale president Ezra Stiles. Caleb and Ruth's only child was Ezra Stiles Gannett.

Gannett attended Phillips Academy in Andover and entered Harvard at age 15. He graduated with highest honors in 1820, and then studied for three years at Harvard Divinity School. He received his ordination on June 30, 1824, as the colleague of the renowned Federal Street Church pastor William Ellery Channing, referred to as "the founder of American Unitarianism".

In the Unitarian Church's doctrinal debates of the 19th century, Gannett consistently sided with his mentor Channing. They represented Unitarian orthodoxy against the challenge of Theodore Parker and the Transcendentalists. Gannett used his role as editor of religious publications—including the Scriptural Interpreter (1831-35), the Monthly Miscellany (1840-43), and the Christian Examiner (1844-49)—to advocate his "conservative theological beliefs".

In 1825, Gannett participated in the discussions that led to the founding of the American Unitarian Association (AUA). He wrote the AUA's constitution and was chosen its first Secretary. He was elected AUA President in 1844 and served in that role for five years.

Following William Ellery Channing's death in 1842, Gannett was named pastor at the Federal Street Church. The next year he was awarded a Doctor of Divinity degree by Harvard. In 1861 he moved with his congregation to a new building, the Arlington Street Church in Back Bay.

A stroke suffered by Gannett in 1840 left him paralyzed in the right leg. For the remainder of his life, he required a pair of canes to walk. His son William later wrote, "They [the canes] became a part of him, the signal to eye and ear, by which every one knew 'Dr. Gannett' in Boston streets." In one of the only times away from his ministry, Gannett spent many months in 1865–66 traveling with William on a Grand Tour of Europe.

On August 26, 1871, Ezra Stiles Gannett was killed in a train wreck a few miles north of Boston. He was buried in Mount Auburn Cemetery.

== Personal life and legacy ==
In 1835, Gannett married Anna Linzee Tilden, a teacher and a member of the Federal Street Church. Before dying in childbirth in 1846, she and Gannett had three children. Their eldest, Catherine Boott Gannett, became a well-known member of the anti-suffragist movement. Their son William Channing Gannett was a noted Unitarian minister of the late 19th century. He helped secure his father's legacy by writing an 1875 biography, Ezra Stiles Gannett: Unitarian Minister in Boston, 1824-1871, which was reprinted in multiple editions over the next two decades.

Ezra Gannett's great-granddaughter was the children's author Ruth Stiles Gannett.
