= Kate Gannett Wells =

American writer, social reformer, and anti-suffragist (1838–1911)

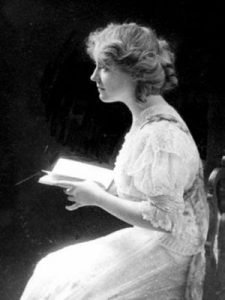
- Born: Catherine Boott Gannett; April 6, 1838; London, England
- Died: December 13, 1911 (aged 73); Boston, Massachusetts, United States
- Occupations: Writer, Social reformer, Anti-suffragist
- Spouse: Samuel Wells Jr.
- Children: Stiles Gannett Wells, Samuel Wells, Louisa Appleton Wells
- Parent(s): Ezra Stiles Gannett and Anna Tilden Gannett
- Relatives: William Channing Gannett (brother)

Kate Gannett Wells (born Catherine Boott Gannett; April 6, 1838 – December 13, 1911) was an American writer and social reformer, and a prominent member of the anti-suffragist movement in the United States. Wells served on the Massachusetts Board of Education for twenty-four years beginning in 1888 and was a vice president of the New England Women's Club. She also published several books, including the novel In the Clearings (1884) and the nonfiction work Campobello: An Historical Sketch.

== Early life and education ==
Wells born in London, England, on April 6, 1838. Her parents, Anna Tilden Gannett and Ezra Stiles Gannett, a prominent Unitarian minister, were both American, but were staying in England to facilitate her father's medical treatment. Wells was reportedly named for her father's doctor, a Dr. Boott, and her mother's sister, Catherine Tilden. Catherine Tilden would later serve as a mother figure to Wells and her two siblings following Anna Gannett's death on Christmas day in 1846, when Wells was eight years old.

On her father's side, Wells was descended from the early New England colonist Mary Chilton and former Yale College President Ezra Stiles.

On June 11, 1863, Wells married Boston lawyer Samuel Wells, Jr., the son of former Maine governor Samuel Wells, with whom she would have three children. The financial stability of the marriage allowed Wells to pursue a career in philanthropy, activism, and literature.

== Philanthropy and activism ==
In 1868, Wells joined the newly established New England Women's Club, and became a vice president of the organization in 1878. She served as chair for the Club's Discussion Committee for several years.

Wells was also an active member of the Massachusetts Moral Education Association, which aimed to prevent prostitution through education and charity, as well as the Association for the Advancement of Women and the Women's Educational and Industrial Union, at which she was a frequent speaker.

In 1887, Wells and Mary Otis Porter founded the Campobello Library, located on Campobello island in New-Brunswick, Canada. The library is the 2nd oldest public library in Canada.

In 1888, Wells was appointed to the Massachusetts Board of Education by then-governor Oliver Ames. She served on the board for three eight-year terms.

During the 1890s, Wells was involved in the Massachusetts Emergency and Hygiene Association, which promoted modern sanitation practices among working class families.

=== Anti-suffragist activism ===
In 1883, Wells became a founding member of the Massachusetts Association Opposed to the Further Extension of Suffrage to Women and spoke on behalf of the association before the Massachusetts State Legislature in 1884, when the Legislature was considering a bill granting women the right to vote in municipal elections. In her speech, Wells argued that women were not yet educated enough to vote responsibly. She was reportedly the only woman at the hearing to speak in opposition to women's suffrage.

Wells' brother, William Channing Gannett, a liberal Unitarian minister and a strong advocate for women's rights, was reportedly dismayed when he learned of his sister's devotion to the anti-suffragist cause, though the two maintained a close relationship. Wells was publicly criticized for her anti-suffragist stance by her fellow women's rights advocates, who had heretofore assumed that she was a supporter of women's suffrage. However, Wells maintained her stance and continued to speak publicly on the issue.

A letter by Wells opposing women's suffrage was read before the Massachusetts Committee on Election Laws on February 1, 1900. In this letter, she wrote, "Our country needs that one half of its people at least should be freed from the restrictions of political organization and ready to work for home, school, and state as women, and not as partisans."

== Literary career ==
Wells' novel Little Dick's Son (1901) was reportedly inspired by her own family life.

Wells also co-authored several editions of the Manual of Unitarian Belief with James Freeman Clarke between 1884 and 1906 and published several essays in The Atlantic.

=== List of fiction works ===
- In the Clearings (1884)
- Miss Curtis; A Sketch (1888)
- Little Dick's Son (1901)

=== List of non-fiction works ===
- Women in Organizations (1880)
- The Transitional American Woman (1880)
- An Old New England Divine (1884)
- The Quoddy Hermit (1885)
- About People (1885)
- Campobello: An Historical Sketch (about the history of Campobello Island)
- Child Study for Mothers and Teachers (1901, co-written by Charlotte Brewster Jordan, Lucy Wheelock, Emilie Poulsson, Charlotte Perkins Gilman, Nora Archibald Smith, and Margaret Elizabeth Sangster)

== Death ==
Wells died in her home in Back Bay, Boston, on December 13, 1911. She is buried at Mount Auburn Cemetery in Cambridge, Massachusetts.
