= Bernard Roizman =

American scientist (1929–2026)

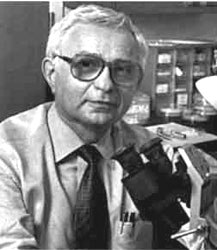
- Born: April 17, 1929; Chișinău, Romania
- Died: April 13, 2026 (aged 96); Chicago, Illinois, U.S.
- Education: Temple University; Johns Hopkins University
- Scientific career
- Fields: Virology, Herpes Simplex
- Doctoral students: Susan Mackem; Elliott D. Kieff

Bernard Roizman (April 17, 1929 – April 13, 2026) was an American scientist. He was the Joseph Regenstein Distinguished Service Professor of Virology in the Department of Microbiology and Department of Molecular Genetics and Cell Biology at the University of Chicago.

== Early life and education ==
Roizman was born in Chișinău, Kingdom of Romania, in 1929. As he later recalled, his early life was "shaped by World War II" and the hardships his family endured as war refugees after being displaced in 1941 by the German invasion of the Soviet Union. The family eventually made their way to the United States in 1948, where they settled in Philadelphia. Roizman received a scholarship to attend a Pennsylvanian college and enrolled at Temple University, from which he received his bachelor's and master's degrees. He subsequently attended the Johns Hopkins School of Public Health, where he received his Sc.D. in 1956.

== Academic career and research ==
Roizman joined the faculty at Johns Hopkins after graduation, and later spent a year as a visiting scientist at the Institut Pasteur in Paris. When he returned to the United States he joined the faculty at the University of Chicago in 1965. He served as department chair from 1985 to 1988. He was one of several prominent virologists involved in the founding of the American Society for Virology and organized a key meeting in Chicago that led to the society's establishment.

Roizman's research interests focused on the herpes simplex virus, particularly on regulation of viral genes and on the use of site-specific mutagenesis to study viral gene function. In 1999 he was involved in an inventorship dispute with a member of his research group, whose lawsuit was ultimately successful..

== Personal life and death ==
Roizman's wife Betty was a legal librarian; they married in 1950. He had a son, Arthur. Roizman died in Chicago on April 13, 2026, at the age of 96.

== Awards and honors ==
- Elected: Member of the United States National Academy of Sciences, 1979
- Fellow, American Academy of Arts and Sciences, 1991
- Fellow, American Academy of Microbiology, 1992
- Bristol-Myers Squibb Award for Distinguished Achievement in Infectious Disease Research, 1998
- Foreign Member, Chinese Academy of Engineering, 2000
- Institute of Medicine, 2001
- Quantrell Award, 2003
- Fellow, American Association for the Advancement of Science, 2004
- Selman A. Waksman Award in Microbiology, 2017
