= Elliott D. Kieff =

American virologist (1943–2024)

- Born: February 2, 1943
- Died: January 4, 2024 (aged 80–81)

Elliott Dan Kieff (February 2, 1943 – January 4, 2024) was an American physician who was the emeritus Harriet Ryan Albee Professor of Microbiology and Immunobiology at Harvard Medical School and Brigham and Women’s Hospital. He had previously served as chair of the Virology Program at Harvard Medical School from 1991 to 2004.

== Education ==
Born in Philadelphia, Kieff received a BS in Chemistry from the University of Pennsylvania in 1964. In 1968, Kieff received an M.D. from Johns Hopkins University. During his clinical training in Internal Medicine at Hopkins, Kieff began to work in the Department of Microbiology with Bernard Roizman.

In 1971, Kieff received a PhD from the University of Chicago for studies on the size, structure, and relatedness among Herpes Viruses DNAs. In 1986, Kieff joined the faculty of Harvard Medical School. In 1988, he was appointed to the Harriet Ryan Albee Professorship of Microbiology and Immunobiology at Harvard Medical School and the Brigham and Women’s Hospital.

== Research ==
In 1971, Kieff set up a lab at the University of Chicago to study Epstein-Barr Virus (EBV). He characterized EBV's DNA, RNAs, and proteins, including their roles in infection and oncogenesis. He also compared EBV genomes from different diseases and developed annotated maps of these genomes.

In 1986, Kieff moved to Harvard Medical School and Brigham and Women’s Hospital. There, he identified essential EBV genes for growth transformation and roles of various EBV proteins in cell growth transformation. He found LMP1, an EBV oncogene, to activate NF-κB, promoting EBV infected cell growth and survival.

Kieff authored over 300 journal articles and 27 books. His work has been supported by the NIH National Cancer Institute, the American Cancer Society, and the National Institute of Allergy and Infectious Disease.

== Personal life and death ==
Kieff married his wife, Jacqueline, in 1965. He died on January 4, 2024, at the age of 80.

== Awards and honors ==
- 1976 – elected to the American Society for Clinical Investigation.
- 1988 – elected to the Interurban Club,
- 1985 – elected to the Association of American Physicians (AAP)
- 1991 – Karl Meyer Visiting Professor at UCSF.
- 1987 & 1994 – received Outstanding Investigator Awards from the NIH NCI.
- 1996 – elected to the National Academy of Sciences.
- 1996 – received an Alumni AOA award from Johns Hopkins.
- 2001 – elected to the Institute of Medicine and the American Academy of Arts and Sciences.
- 2006 – Lamb Visiting Professor at Vanderbilt University.
- 2008 – elected vice president of the AAP
- 2009 – elected president of the AAP
- 2011 – received a Distinguished Alumnus Award from the University of Chicago.
- 2011 and 2014 – gave the Howard Taylor Ricketts Memorial Lecture at the University of Chicago.

== Selected publications ==
- Raab-Traub N, Dambaugh T, Kieff E. DNA of Epstein-Barr virus VIII: B95-8, the previous prototype, is an unusual deletion derivative. Cell. 1980 Nov;22:257-67.
- Dambaugh T, Nkrumah FK, Biggar RJ, Kieff E. Epstein-Barr virus RNA in Burkitt tumor tissue. Cell. 1979 Feb;16(2):313-22.
- Matsuo T, Heller M, Petti L, O'Shiro E, Kieff E. Persistence of the entire Epstein-Barr virus genome integrated into human lymphocyte DNA. Science. 1984 Dec14;226(4680):1322-5.
- Hennessy K, Heller M, van Santen V, Kieff E. Simple repeat array in Epstein-Barr virus DNA encodes part of the Epstein-Barr nuclear antigen. Science. 1983 Jun 24;220(4604):1396-8.
- Wang D, Liebowitz D, Kieff E. An EBV membrane protein expressed in immortalized lymphocytes transforms established rodent cells. Cell. 1985 Dec; 43:831-40.
- Hennessy K, Kieff E. A second nuclear protein is encoded by Epstein-Barr virus in latent infection. Science. 1985 Mar 8;227(4691):1238-40.
- Tanner J, Weis J, Fearon D, Whang Y, Kieff E. Epstein-Barr virus gp350/220 binding to the B lymphocyte C3d receptor mediates adsorption, capping, and endocytosis. Cell. 1987 Jul 17;50(2):203-13.
- Henderson S, Rowe M, Gregory C, Croom-Carter D, Wang F, Longnecker R, Kieff E, Rickinson A. Induction of bcl-2 expression by Epstein-Barr virus latent membrane protein 1 protects infected B cells from programmed cell death. Cell. 1991 Jun 28; 65(7):1107-15.
- Mosialos G, Birkenbach M, Yalamanchili R, VanArsdale T, Ware C, Kieff E. The Epstein-Barr virus transforming protein LMP1 engages signaling proteins for the tumor necrosis factor receptor family. Cell. 1995 Feb 10;80(3):389-99.
- Miller CL, Burkhardt AL, Lee JH, Stealey B, Longnecker R, Bolen JB, Kieff E. Integral membrane protein 2 of Epstein-Barr virus regulates reactivation from latency through dominant negative effects on protein-tyrosine kinases. Immunity. 1995 Feb;2(2):155-66.
- Mannick JB, Asano K, Izumi K, Kieff E, Stamler JS. Nitric oxide produced by human B lymphocytes inhibits apoptosis and Epstein-Barr virus reactivation. Cell. 1994 Dec 30;79(7):1137-46.
- Zhou H, Schmidt SC, Jiang S, Willox B, Bernhardt K, Liang J, Johannsen EC, Kharchenko P, Gewurz BE, Kieff E, Zhao B. Epstein-Barr virus oncoprotein super-enhancers control B cell growth. Cell Host Microbe. 2015 Feb 11;17(2):205-16.
