= Daniel Kuritzkes =

American physician

Daniel Robert Kuritzkes is an American physician.

Kuritzkes studied molecular biophysics and biochemistry at Yale University and completed his medical degree at Harvard Medical School. He was trained in internal medicine and infectious diseases at Massachusetts General Hospital and became a visiting scientist at the Whitehead Institute for Biomedical Research prior to joining the University of Colorado Health Sciences Center faculty. Kuritzkes returned to Harvard Medical School in 2002, where he succeeded Elliott D. Kieff as head of the Clinical Infectious Disease Division and the Harriet Ryan Albee Professorship in Medicine.
