= Federal Street Church =

Church in Boston, Massachusetts, United States

Coordinates: 42°21′20″N 71°03′23″W

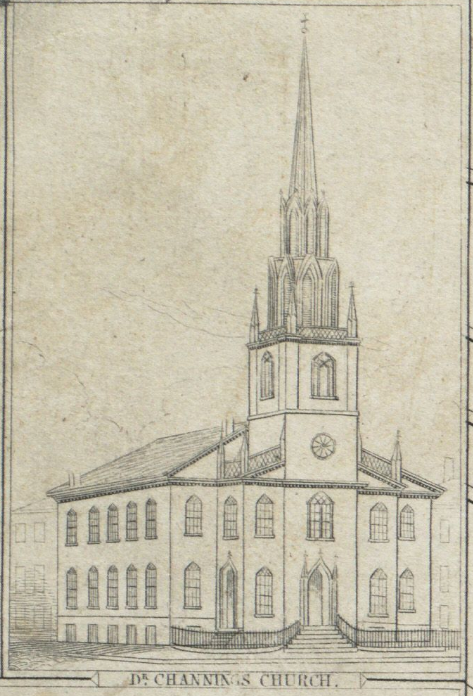
Federal St. Church, Boston, built in 1809

The Federal Street Church (established 1729) was a congregational Unitarian church in Boston, Massachusetts. Organized in 1727, the originally Presbyterian congregation changed in 1786 to "Congregationalism", then adopted the liberal theology of its fifth senior minister, William Ellery Channing, (1780–1842). For most of the 18th century the church was known as the Long Lane Meeting-House. In 1788, state leaders met in the relatively spacious building to determine Massachusetts' ratification of the United States Constitution. Thereafter the church renamed itself the Federal Street Church in honor of the event. In 1803, it called Channing as its minister who defined "Unitarian Christianity" and launched the Unitarian movement, making the Federal Street Church one of the first to define itself as Unitarian.

== History ==
=== 1727–1803 ===
The congregation began as a group of Scots-Irish Calvinists gathered in a converted barn on Long Lane in Boston on November 15, 1729. The inhospitable residents of Boston dubbed them derogatorily as "The Church of the Presbyterian Strangers", and the name stuck. "Their first house of worship was a barn, which sufficed until they were able, in 1744, to build a neat wooden edifice. Governor Hancock presented the bell and vane which had belonged to the Old Brattle Street Meeting-house." "The Presbyterian was exchanged for the Congregational form of government, by a unanimous vote, August 6, 1786.

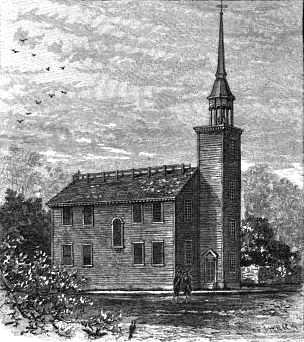
Long Lane Meeting House, Boston (1744 – c.1809)

"It was the Federal St. Church where the Massachusetts convention congregated, when debating and deciding on the confederating constitution of the United States in 1788; and from that time, the name of the street was changed from Long Lane to Federal Street."

=== 1803–1842 ===
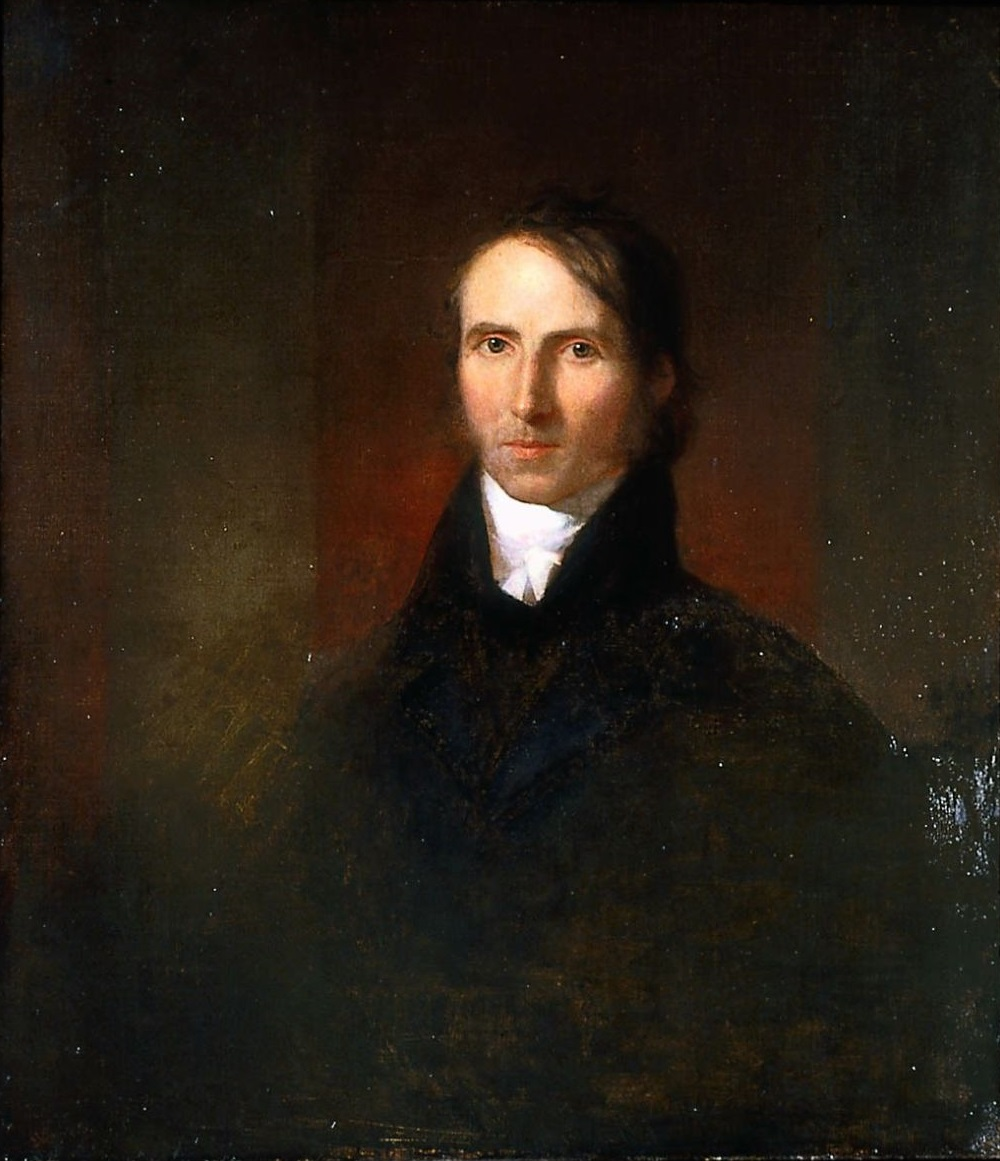
Portrait of Dr. Channing, by Washington Allston, 1811

William Ellery Channing, (1780–1842), often known as "The Father of American Unitarianism", served as Senior Minister at the Federal Street Church from 1803 to 1842. Under his leadership the congregation prospered. To accommodate the crowds that Channing drew, the third meeting house, designed by the noted architect Charles Bulfinch, was built in 1809 on the Federal Street site. At the time, Bulfinch's design received mixed reviews. "The lightest and most graceful steeple in Boston is in Federal Street, of the Gothic order. We believe the Federal Street Church is the first attempt at this style of architecture in Massachusetts, and one of the first in the United States. It has great faults, and, indeed, few merits except the steeple."

On May 5, 1819, Channing delivered "The Baltimore Sermon", which defined the new Unitarian theology for the burgeoning "Unitarian" movement. Although Channing originally resisted formation of a new denomination, under the direction of his associate and later successor, Ezra Stiles Gannett, the move toward separation from the Congregationalists began. The American Unitarian Association was formed in the vestry of the Federal Street Church on May 25, 1825, with Channing offering well wishes and Gannett serving as Secretary. Through brilliant preaching, writing, and publishing, Channing made many contributions to the moral thought of his day, none more important than his clearly reasoned though highly delayed statement against slavery, which became a national best seller, even as it alienated some of his wealthy parishioners who opposed abolition. In 1903, on the 100th anniversary of his installation as minister, a statue of Channing was placed in the Boston Public Garden.

=== 1842–1861 ===
By mid-century overcrowding in the neighborhood "necessitated a change of location, and in 1859 the church sold their property and built the elegant brown stone building on the corner of Arlington and Boylston Streets, which was dedicated in December, 1861. The congregation continues today as the Arlington Street Church in Back Bay.

=== Pastors ===
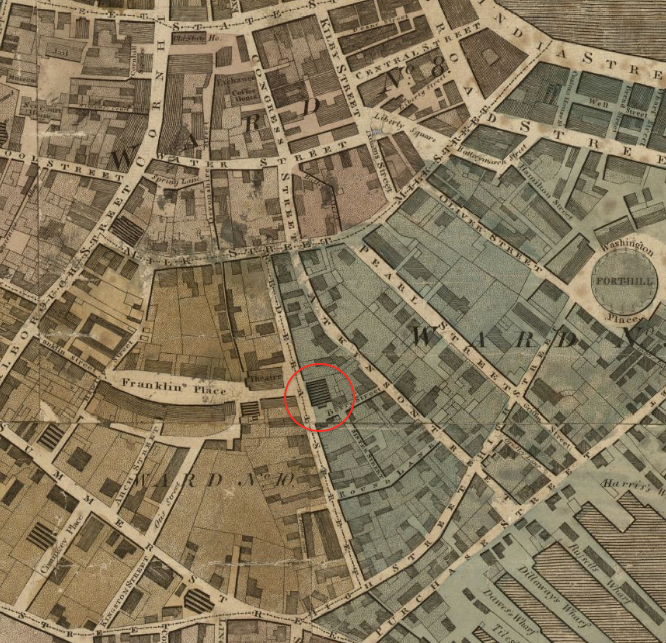
1814 map of Boston, showing Federal St. location of the church

- John Moorhead (pastor c.1730 – 1773; d.1773)
- Robert Annan (pastor 1783–1786)
- Jeremy Belknap (pastor 1787–1798)
- John S. Popkin (pastor 1799–1802)
- William Ellery Channing (pastor 1803–1842)
- Ezra Stiles Gannett (pastor 1824–1871)

== See also ==
- Arlington Street Church
- Channing Home
