= Brigham and Women's Hospital =

Hospital in Boston, Massachusetts

- Mass General Brigham

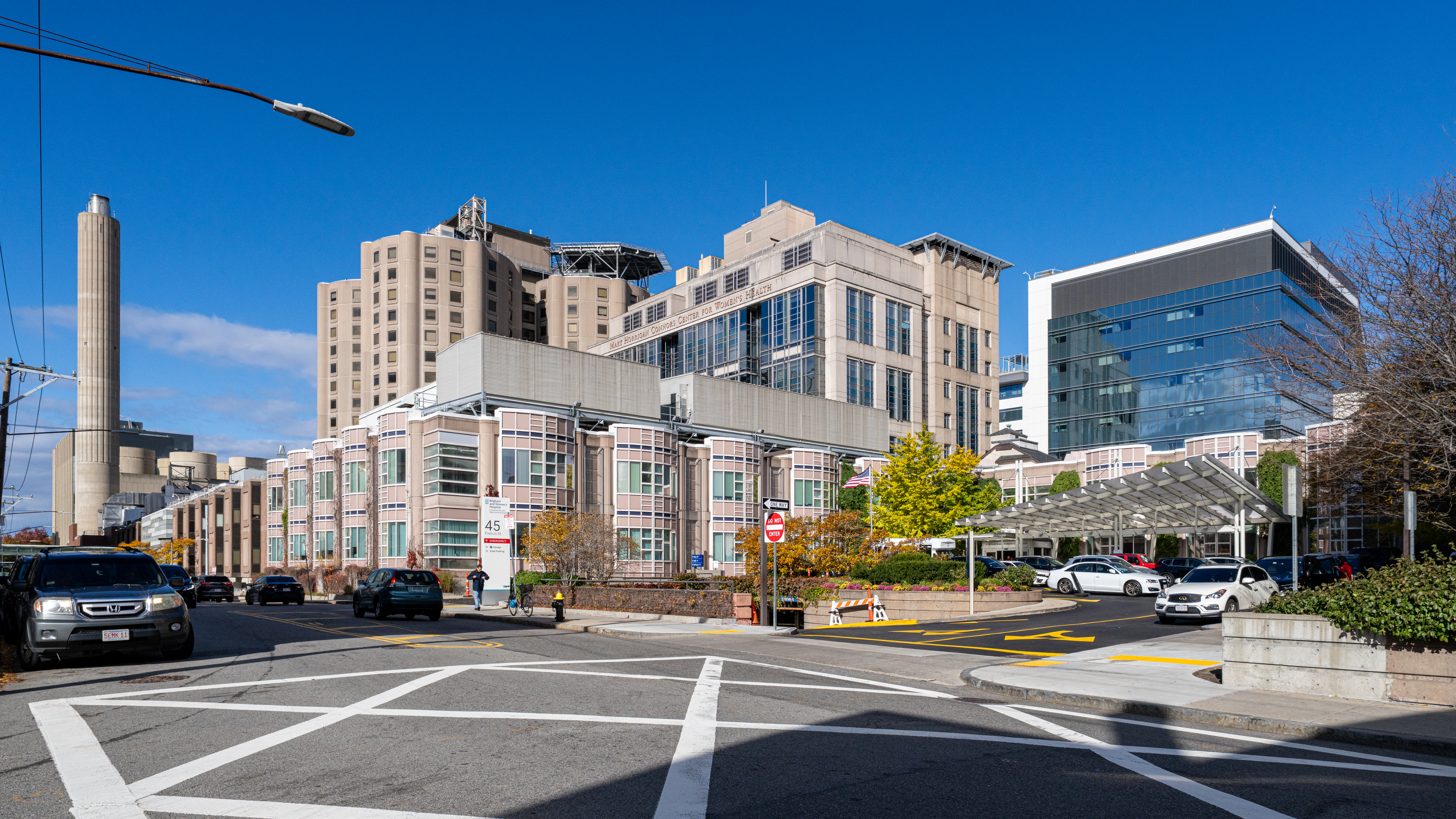
- Brigham and Women’s Hospital main campus, viewed from Francis Street

Geography
- Location: 75 Francis Street; Boston, Massachusetts, United States
- Coordinates: 42°20′10″N 71°06′25″W

Organization
- Type: Teaching
- Affiliated university: Harvard University

Services
- Emergency department: Level I trauma center
- Beds: 793

Helipads
- Helipad: (FAA LID: MA39)
Number	Length		Surface
Number	ft	m	Surface
H1	54	16	Rooftop, metal

History
- Founded: 1980
- Closed: Bus 8, 19, 39, 47, 60, 65, 66, CT2, CT3; Green Line D, E

Links
- Website: brighamandwomens.org
- Lists: Hospitals in Massachusetts

Brigham and Women's Hospital (BWH or The Brigham) is a teaching hospital of Harvard Medical School and the largest hospital in the Longwood Medical Area in Boston, Massachusetts. Along with Massachusetts General Hospital, it is one of the two founding members of Mass General Brigham, the largest healthcare provider in Massachusetts. Giles Boland, MD, serves as the hospital's current president.

Brigham and Women's Hospital conducts the second largest hospital-based research program in the world, with an annual research budget of more than $630 million.

== History ==
Brigham and Women's Hospital was established with the 1980 merger of three Harvard-affiliated hospitals: Peter Bent Brigham Hospital (established in 1913); Robert Breck Brigham Hospital (established in 1914); and Boston Hospital for Women (established in 1966 as a merger of Boston Lying-In Hospital, established in 1832, and Free Hospital for Women, established in 1875).

In 1954, the Peter Bent Brigham Hospital became the location for the first-ever successful kidney transplant, performed on identical twins, Ronald Hendrick (the donor) and Richard Hendrick (the recipient). J. Hartwell Harrison, Chief of the Urology Department, operated on the donor, and Joseph Murray was the surgeon for the recipient. Murray later received a Nobel Prize for this and other work. Dr. Samuel A. Levine introduced the arm-chair treatment of myocardial infarction in the 1950s and his protégé Dr. Bernard Lown was an early innovator in the development of the coronary care unit in the 1960s.

In 1990, Paula Johnson became the first African American to hold the position of chief medical resident at the hospital.

After a 10-year affiliation with Faulkner Hospital in the Jamaica Plain section of Boston, BWH merged with the community hospital in 2012 to form Brigham and Women's Faulkner Hospital.

In April 2017, Brigham and Women's announced they would be offering voluntary buyouts to 1,600 staff in an effort to control costs. The hospital was profitable, but this move was due to higher labor and other costs amid stagnant payments from insurance companies. The hospital also needed to pay for two large projects, a $550 million new outpatient and research building that opened the previous year and a $335 million new software system launched in 2015.

Also in April 2017, the United States District Court for the District of Massachusetts announced that Brigham and Women's Hospital and its nonprofit hospital and physicians network, Partners HealthCare, agreed to pay a $10 million fine to resolve allegations that a stem cell research lab fraudulently obtained federal grant funding.

In the late 2010s, Brigham Health contracted with Evergrande to provide medical training and consulting to set up the private Boao Evergrande International Hospital in China. The venture struggled due to lack of patients; the contract was allowed to lapse and Brigham branding was removed by mid-2021.

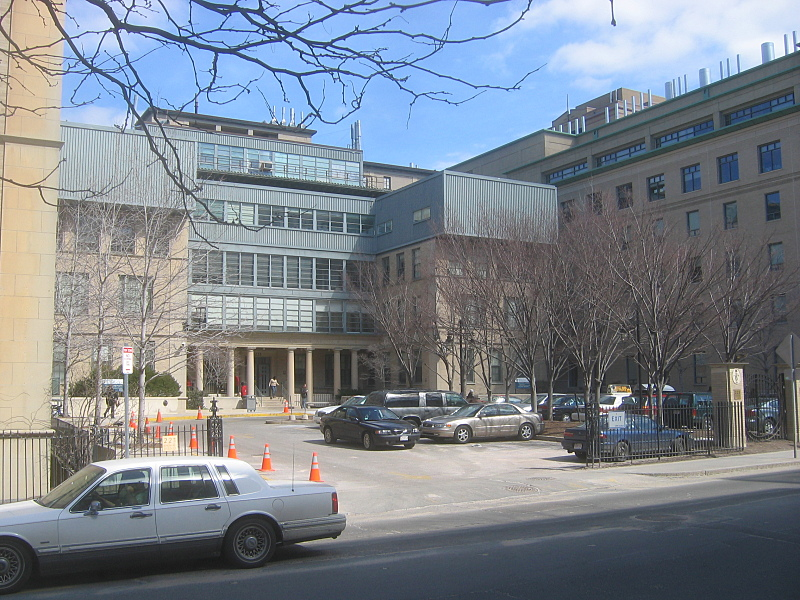
221 Longwood Avenue, formerly the Boston Lying-In Hospital building, part of Brigham and Women's Hospital but separate from the main building at 15–75 Francis Street; view from Longwood Avenue

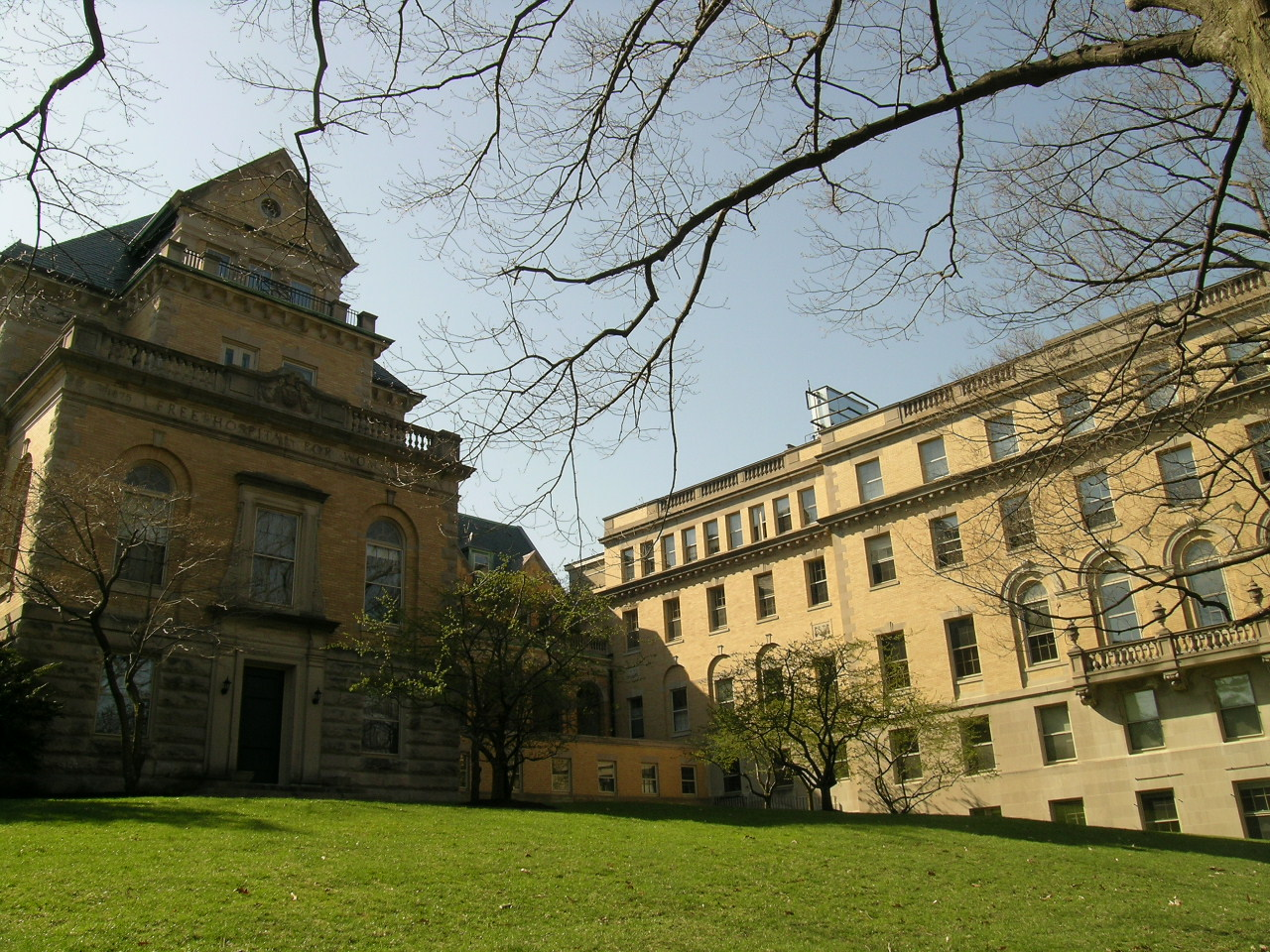
Former site of the Free Hospital for Women across the street from Olmsted Park. This institution was absorbed into Brigham and Women's Hospital.

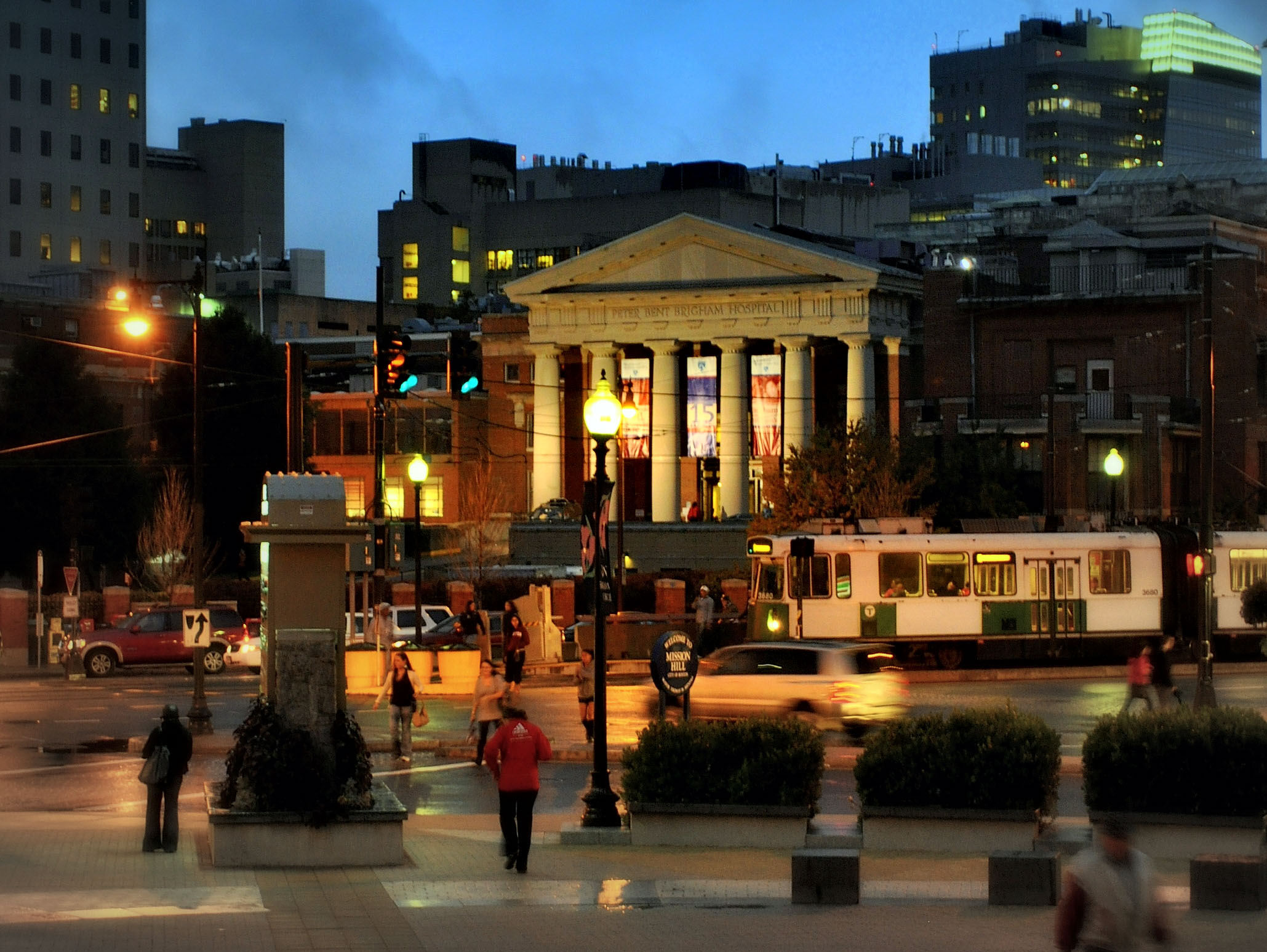
Remaining entrance for the original site of the Peter Bent Brigham Hospital, established in 1913

== Rankings ==
Brigham and Women's Hospital has consistently been recognized as a top hospital in the nation by U.S. News & World Report and in 2025 was ranked as the joint #1 hospital in Massachusetts, alongside Massachusetts General Hospital.

In 2024, Brigham and Women’s Hospital was ranked first in the nation for obstetrics and gynecology for the third consecutive year and was ranked nationally in 12 specialties, including in diabetes & endocrinology (#2 in the nation), cancer (#4 in the nation), and rheumatology (#4 in the nation).

== Quality and safety ==
In the early 1990s, BWH pioneered computerized physician order entry to prevent medication errors. BWH has received patient safety awards for its electronic Medication Administration Record (eMAR) and barcoding system, which places barcodes on patients' medications, name bands, and nurses' badges.

In July 2026, nurses launched a historic 1-day strike, involving 4,000+ nurses (represented by the Massachusetts Nurses Association). While initially voted on a 1-day strike, MGB/BWH instituted a 5-day lockout; nurses who intended to return to work on July 9 were barred until July 13.

== Research ==
BRI has worked on regenerative medicine, designing nanoparticles to attack different cancer types and starting a clinical trial for a type of Alzheimer's disease vaccine. BWH research also includes population studies including the Nurses' Health Study and Physicians' Health Study.

In 2017, the hospital began the first human clinical trials to reverse the aging process using NAD^{+}. The trials are headed by biologist David Andrew Sinclair.

In 2019, BWH opened the Brigham Preventive Genomics Clinic, becoming one of the first hospitals in the United States to offer DNA sequencing, reporting, and interpretation of disease-associated genes to healthy patients seeking to reduce their risk of future disease.

== See also ==
- Channing Home
