= American Unitarian Association =

Religious denomination in the United States and Canada

- Classification: Unitarian
- Polity: Congregational
- Region: Canada, United States and Japan
- Headquarters: Boston, Massachusetts, United States
- Origin: May 26, 1825
- Separated from: Congregational churches
- Merged into: Unitarian Universalist Association (1961)

The American Unitarian Association (AUA) was a religious denomination in the United States and Canada, formed by associated Unitarian congregations in 1825. In 1961, it consolidated with the Universalist Church of America to form the Unitarian Universalist Association.

The AUA was formed in 1825 in the aftermath of a split within New England's Congregational churches between those congregations that embraced Unitarian doctrines and those that maintained Calvinist theology.

According to Mortimer Rowe, the Secretary (i.e. chief executive) of the British Unitarians for 20 years, the AUA was founded on the same day as the British and Foreign Unitarian Association: "By a happy coincidence, in those days of slow posts, no transatlantic telegraph, telephone or wireless, our American cousins, in complete ignorance as to the details of what was afoot, though moving towards a similar goal, founded the American Unitarian Association on precisely the same day—May 26, 1825."

The AUA's official journal was The Christian Register (1821–1961).

Beginning in 1825 the AUA published "tracts" for free distribution and in the 20th century "pamphlets" for free distribution. The AUA also published books and several book series including The Devotional Library, The Theological Library, Memorable Sermons and The Beacon Series: A Graded Course of Study for the Sunday School.

== Notable member congregations ==
- First Unitarian Church (Baltimore, Maryland)
- Federal Street Church (Boston)
- First Unitarian Church of Philadelphia
- Unitarian Church of All Souls
- First Unitarian Universalist Society of San Francisco
- First Unitarian Church of Oakland
- First Unitarian Church of Berkeley
- First Unitarian Church of Riverside
- First Unitarian Church of Chicago
- Unitarian Church of Urbana
- First Unitarian Church of Detroit
- Unitarian Universalist Church of Lancaster, Pennsylvania
- All Souls Church, Unitarian (Washington, D.C.)
- Unitarian Universalist Church of Arlington
- Unitarian Church in Charleston

== See also ==
- Joseph Priestley House
- List of Unitarian, Universalist, and Unitarian Universalist churches
- Meadville Lombard Theological School
- Theophilus Lindsey
- William Ellery Channing

== General and cited references ==
- Rowe, Mortimer (1959). The History of Essex Hall. London: Lindsey Press. Archived from the original on 2012-01-16.
- Wright, Conrad, ed. (1989) [1975]. A Stream of Light: A Short History of American Unitarianism (2nd ed.). Boston: Skinner House Books.
