= Channing (name) =

Channing is both a surname and a given name. Notable people with the name include:

== Surname ==
- Blanche Mary Channing (1860–1902), American poet and writer of juvenile fiction
- Carol Channing (1921–2019), American actress
- Chad Channing (born 1967), American drummer, formerly with Nirvana
- Edward Channing (1856–1931), American historian
- Edward Tyrrel Channing (1790–1856), American academic and lawyer
- Francis Channing, 1st Baron Channing of Wellingborough (1841–1926), American-born British barrister, academic and politician
- Grace Ellery Channing (1862–1937), American writer and poet
- Justin Channing (born 1968), English former footballer
- Mary Channing (1687–1706), English woman burnt at the stake for poisoning her husband
- Michael Channing (born 1992), English-born former Wales international rugby league footballer
- Neil Channing (born 1967), English poker player
- Roscoe Channing (1868–1961), American football player, member of the Rough Riders and mining executive
- Stockard Channing (born 1944), American actress
- Walter Channing Jr. (1940–2015), American businessman
- Walter Channing (physician) (1786–1876), American physician
- Dr. William Ellery Channing (1780–1842), American Unitarian theologian
- William Ellery Channing (poet) (1818–1901), American poet
- William Henry Channing (1810–1884), American writer and philosopher

== Given name ==
- Channing Canada (born 2002), American football player
- Channing H. Cox (1879–1968), American politician
- Channing Crowder (born 1983), American football linebacker
- Channing Der, American microbiologist and cancer researcher
- Channing Dungey (born 1969), American television executive and producer, first African-American president of a major broadcast television network
- Channing Foster (born 1998), American former soccer player
- Channing Frye (born 1983), American basketball player
- Channing Gibson, American television producer and writer
- Channing Hill (born 1987), American jockey
- Channing Godfrey Peoples (fl. 2013–present), American writer, film director and producer
- Channing D. Phillips (born 1958), American attorney, former acting United States Attorney for the District of Columbia
- Channing E. Phillips (1928–1987), American activist and minister
- Channing Robertson (born 1943/4), American chemical engineer and professor emeritus
- Channing Rudd (1875–1920), American government official, lawyer, and academic administrator
- Channing Stribling (born 1994), American football player
- Channing Tatum (born 1980), American actor
- Channing Tindall (born 2000), American football player
- Channing Heggie Tobias (1882–1961), American civil rights activist
- Channing Ward (born 1992), American former football player
- Channing Moore Williams (1829–1910), Anglican bishop and saint
- Channing Wilroy (born 1940), American actor

== Fictional characters ==
- Angela Channing, a main character and matriarch in Falcon Crest, an American soap opera, played by Jane Wyman
  - Relatives of Angela Channing - Emma Channing, Julia Cumson (née Channing), Maggie Channing, Richard Channing, Terry Channing - see List of Falcon Crest characters#Main characters
- Margo Channing, protagonist of All About Eve, a 1950 film, played by Bette Davis
- the title character of Channing of the Northwest, a 1922 American film
- Caroline Channing, a protagonist in American TV series 2 Broke Girls. Played by Beth Behrs.
