= Walter Channing =

Walter Channing may refer to:

- Walter Channing (physician) (1786–1876), American physician
- Walter Channing Jr., 20th-century American businessman
