= Francis Channing, 1st Baron Channing of Wellingborough =

British politician

The Right Honourable The Lord Channing of Wellingborough
- circa 1895

Member of Parliament for East Northamptonshire
- In office 24 November 1885 – 3 December 1910
- Preceded by: New constituency
- Succeeded by: Sir Leo Chiozza Money

Personal details
- Born: 21 March 1841 Cincinnati, Ohio, United States
- Died: 20 February 1926 (aged 84) Eastbourne, Sussex, England
- Party: Liberal
- Spouse: Elizabeth Bryant (died 1925)
- Education: Exeter College, Oxford

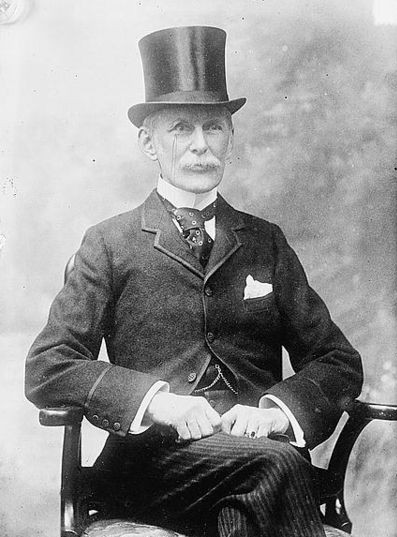
Baron Channing

Francis Allston Channing, 1st Baron Channing (21 March 1841 – 20 February 1926), known as Sir Francis Channing, Bt, between 1906 and 1912, was an American-born British barrister, academic, and Liberal Party politician.

== Background and education ==
Channing born in Cincinnati, Ohio, United States, the youngest child and only son of American parents, Reverend William Henry Channing and Julia Maria Allen (died 1889). His sister was Blanche Mary Chaning, a writer a poet.

He was the great-grandson of the Honourable William Channing, Attorney General of Rhode Island, by Lucy Ellery, daughter of William Ellery, a signer of the United States Declaration of Independence. He was the great-nephew of Dr William Ellery Channing, Walter Channing and Edward Tyrrel Channing and a first cousin once removed of William Ellery Channing.

He was naturalized as a British subject in 1883. He was educated at Exeter College, Oxford and subsequently became a fellow, lecturer and tutor in philosophy at University College, Oxford, and was called to the bar at Lincoln's Inn. A passionate Protestant he attended and spoke at the United Protestant Demonstration in London on 29 January 1900 which resolved ) “to uphold and maintain the Protestantism of the nation and to demand the suppression of the Mass and the Confessional in the Established Church.”

== Political career ==
Channing was elected as Liberal Member of Parliament (MP) for East Northamptonshire at the 1885 general election, and held the seat until the December 1910 general election. From 1893 to 1896 he was a member of the Royal Commission on Agricultural Depression. He was made a Baronet, of Maiden Newton in the County of Dorset, on 3 December 1906, and on 9 July 1912 he was elevated to the peerage as Baron Channing of Wellingborough, in the County of Northampton. In 1918 he published Memories of Midland Politics, 1885-1910.

== Family ==
Lord Channing of Wellingborough married Elizabeth Bryant on 21 July 1869. They had three daughters and one son, but only his eldest daughter, the Honourable Mary Channing (died 1940), survived infancy. Lady Channing of Wellingborough died at 40 Eaton Place, London, in August 1925. Lord Channing only survived her by seven months and died in Eastbourne, Sussex, in February 1926, aged 84. He was buried in Torquay. The baronetcy and barony died with him.

Parliament of the United Kingdom
New constituency	Member of Parliament for East Northamptonshire; 1885 – Dec. 1910	Succeeded by Sir Leo Chiozza Money
Baronetage of the United Kingdom
New creation	Baronet (of Maiden Newton); 1906–1926	Extinct
Preceded by Cawley baronets	Channing baronets of Maiden Newton; 3 December 1906	Succeeded by Graham baronets
Peerage of the United Kingdom
New creation	Baron Channing of Wellingborough; 1912–1926	Extinct
