= David Wasson =

David Wasson may refer to:

- Dave Wasson, American television producer, director and screenwriter
- David Atwood Wasson (1823–1887), American minister and Transcendentalist author
