= Free Religious Association =

American freethought organization

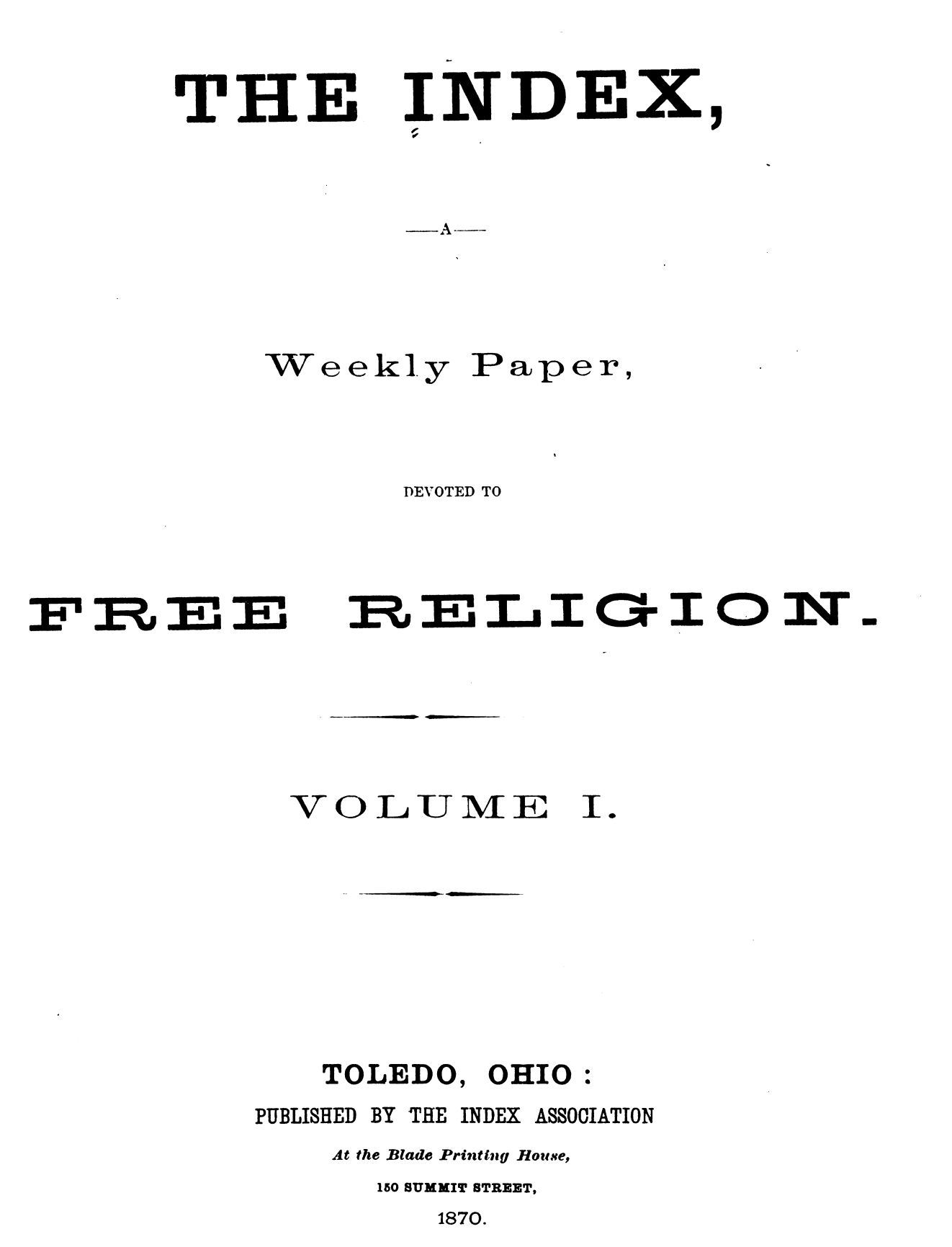
The Index: A Weekly Paper Devoted to Free Religion, 1870

The Free Religious Association (FRA) was an American organization founded in 1867 to encourage free inquiry into religious matters and to promote what its founders called "free religion," which they understood to be the essence of religion that is expressed in a variety of ways around the world. The FRA founders hoped eventually to see the development of a new religion that was rational, progressive and based on what was universal in the world's existing religions.

Most of its founders were Unitarians who opposed the decision by a Unitarian national convention in 1865 to define the denomination as exclusively Christian. Seeking a broader movement, the organizers of the FRA invited people from several other religious traditions, including Jews and Spiritualists, to their founding meeting, and they invited representatives of eastern religions to address other meetings.

Many FRA members continued to be active as Unitarians, and they continued to promote the ideas of the FRA within their denomination. In 1894, the Unitarian National Conference essentially accepted the position of the FRA, removing part of the original reason for its creation. The FRA was still active until at least 1917, when it celebrated its fiftieth anniversary.

The FRA worked largely through lectures, books and periodicals, including The Index, which was published weekly from 1870 to 1886.

== History ==
In 1825, the American Unitarian Association (AUA) was formed by people who disagreed with the traditional Christian doctrine of the Trinity, the belief that God is three persons (Jehovah, Jesus, and the Holy Spirit). The founders of the AUA believed in the unity of God, considering Jesus to be an exalted but subordinate being.

A national convention of Unitarians was organized in 1865 that for the first time included direct representation of individual congregations. The convention's decision to characterize the denomination as exclusively Christian created friction with a vocal minority who wanted a broader approach. Unitarians who wanted the denomination to be open to non-Christians argued for their approach again at the 1866 convention but again without success.

Characterizing the AUA as exclusively Christian created a problem for the increasing number of Unitarians who were beginning to challenge traditional views, such as the authority of the Bible and the existence of miracles. This was especially true for two influential groups within the denomination, the transcendentalists and those drawn to the use of scientific methods. The transcendentalists, who were closely identified with Ralph Waldo Emerson, challenged orthodox thinking with their belief that religious understanding was best achieved through direct intuition. The group oriented toward science wanted to modify traditional Unitarian teachings to accommodate recent scientific developments, including evolution. Francis Abbot, a leader figure in this group, developed what he called "scientific theism," which called for all theological concepts, including God and immortality, to be subjected to scientific scrutiny "on the basis of observed facts and leading to verifiable results." Despite their very different approaches, these two groups wanted to join with others to form an organization that would actively encourage the exploration of alternative religious views.

On May 30, 1867, Unitarian dissidents organized a meeting in Horticultural Hall in Boston that formed the Free Religious Association (FRA). A large proportion of the participants were Unitarian ministers. Other participants included Universalists, Quakers, Jews, Spiritualists, and people with no religious affiliation at all. Among the speakers were Ralph Waldo Emerson, Lucretia Mott, Robert Dale Owen, and Rabbi Isaac M. Wise. Emerson was the first person to be officially enrolled in the new organization.

The founders of the FRA were guided by two main principles. One was the freedom to explore unorthodox religious ideas without any restrictions of tradition, creed and external authority. William J. Potter, the primary force within the FRA during its most active years, described the FRA as a sort of "spiritual anti-slavery society", referring to the recent success of the movement to eliminate slavery in the U.S. He said the goal of the movement was to "bring people together in religious union" while "liberating religion from every sort of thralldom to irrational and merely traditional authority".

The other principle was to promote what its founders called "free religion," which was understood to be the essence of religion that is expressed in a variety of ways in cultures around the world. They believed that all major religions are fundamentally the same, and that every specific religion is simply a phase of universal religion. The FRA founders hoped their movement would eventually lead to a new religion that was rational, progressive and based on what was universal in the world's religions. Potter said, "Free Religion is the natural outcome of every historical religion—the final unity, therefore, towards which all historical religions slowly tend." Potter predicted that the new religion would appear in his lifetime through process of evolution that was already working through the existing religions.

The founding convention adopted a constitution that said the goal of the FRA was "to promote the interests of pure religion, to encourage the scientific study of theology, and to increase the fellowship of the spirit." The constitution was modified in 1872 to make it clear that one did not need to believe in God to be a member. In 1874, Lucretia Mott succeeded in having the constitution modified to say, "to encourage the scientific study of man's religious nature and history" instead of "to encourage the scientific study of theology," which put less emphasis on technical issues of theology and more on issues of religion in everyday life.

FRA members held a variety of religious views. Abbot, who advocated "scientific theism," understood God to be a person, whereas Octavius Frothingham saw God as a force of nature. The Cosmists, who were followers of Herbert Spencer, conceived of God as the soul of the universe and inseparable from it. The transcendentalists believed in "the Emersonian concept of the Over-Soul, the transcendent universal Mind." Some FRA members were agnostics, including Felix Adler. None of its members were avowed atheists, although they would have been considered to be religious if their actions were based on "an inward ethical imperative".

In 1892, FRA vice presidents included the abolitionist leader Frederick Douglass, who had escaped from slavery as a young man and gained fame as a public speaker and the editor of the North Star, an abolitionist newspaper.

Many FRA members continued to be practicing Unitarians, and they promoted the ideas of the FRA within that denomination with increasing success. In 1894, the Unitarian National Conference essentially accepted the position of the FRA, removing part of the original reason for its creation.

The FRA began to decline in the mid to late 1870s. Octavius Frothingham was succeeded as president of the FRA in 1878 by Felix Adler, founder of the Ethical Culture movement, which was open to people of diverse religious beliefs. Adler tried to rejuvenate the organization with a program of establishing a network of local societies that would promote education about the science of religion and would work to advance social welfare. Adler's project failed to gather enough support within the FRA, however, and he resigned from the organization in 1882.

The proceedings of the FRA's 47th annual meeting were published with the title World Religion and World Brotherhood. The association was still active until at least 1917, when it celebrated its 50th anniversary in Boston.

== Lectures ==
The FRA sponsored a series of lectures near Harvard University in 1867-1868 to reach students at the Harvard Divinity School. The lectures were so successful they disturbed the school's leadership. The class of 1868 afterwards invited FRA member John Weiss to be to be their class preacher, and the class of 1869 did the same with FRA member Octavius Frothingham. The committee of conservative Unitarians in charge of overseeing the divinity school subsequently interrogated each member of the class of 1869 about their religious views and denied two of them their stipend. In response, almost all students in that class refused to accept their stipends. The issue was eventually settled to the students' satisfaction.

Encouraged by the success of those lectures, the FRA organized a series of lectures at Boston's Horticultural Hall. They attracted considerable interest for several years, but as the novelty of the FRA's views wore off, the lectures were discontinued in 1878.

The FRA held annual national conventions at various cities throughout the country. These conventions usually included three or four public meetings at which FRA speakers would discuss the principles of free religion. Representatives of Eastern religions were often invited to speak at FRA meetings.

== Publications ==
=== Books and pamphlets ===
Several FRA members published books to support their movement. Samuel Johnson produced a three-volume work called Oriental Religions and Their Relation to Universal Religion. In 1875, the FRA published Freedom and Fellowship in Religion, a collection of addresses by several members on issues relevant to the FRA.

The FRA produced an influential series of pamphlets, especially during the period from 1875 to 1877. Thomas Wentworth Higgenson's "The Sympathy of Religions" was the most widely distributed. In it, Higgenson discusses the admirable features of several non-Christian religions and says, "The name of Christianity only ceases to excite respect when it is used to represent any false or exclusive claims, or when it takes the place of the older and grander words, "Religion" and "Virtue". When we fully comprehend the sympathy of religions we shall deal with other faiths on equal terms." Also well-known was Frances Abbot's "Fifty Affirmations". This collection of brief statements expressed Abbot's views about the nature of what he called pure religion, its current expression in the world's specific religions, and its future expression in a universal religion.

=== The Radical ===
Samuel H. Morse edited and published The Radical, a monthly magazine, in Boston from 1865 to 1873. With about a hundred pages per issue, it represented the interests of the FRA, especially its transcendentalist wing.

=== The Index ===
The Index: A Weekly Paper Devoted to Free Religion was founded in Toledo, Ohio in 1870 as the semi-official periodical of the FRA under the editorship of Francis Abbot. In 1873, it moved to Boston, and in 1880 it came under the direct control of the FRA. Abbot resigned in 1880, after which The Index was edited by William Potter and Benjamin Underwood until the last issue was published in 1886.

Sources disagree on what followed the demise of The Index. Religious Periodicals of the United States by Charles Lippy says, "The Open Court became the official publication of the Free Religious Association in 1887." The Open Court was a new journal published by Edward Hegeler that focused on the intersection of religion and science. Underwood, the previous editor of The Index, was its editor. However, Free Religion: An American Faith by Stow Persons, a book-length study of the free religion movement, says, "The passing of The Index left free religion without an organ of its own." Persons says the subscribers to The Index were transferred to Unity, a progressive Unitarian publication or to Open Court. An edition of Abbot's "Truths for the Time" that was published sometime after 1888 includes a "Notice" on the final page that quotes Abbot as saying that "Unity is the sole legitimate heir, successor and continuation of the Index."

In 1872, Abbott sent a copy of his pamphlet "Truths for Our Times" to Charles Darwin. Darwin liked it and gave Abbott permission to print his endorsement of the pamphlet in The Index. In gratitude, Abbot gave Darwin a lifetime subscription to The Index. Darwin sent a donation of £25 to Abbot, but then, in 1880, he withdrew his endorsement of the pamphlet without explanation.

== Notable members ==
- Francis Ellingwood Abbot, one of the main leaders of the FRA
- Felix Adler, the leading agnostic within the FRA
- Mary Alderson Chandler Atherton, educator and textbook author
- Moncure Conway, abolitionist, dissident Unitarian minister, and freethinker
- Frederick Douglass, an abolitionist leader who as a young man had escaped from slavery
- Ralph Waldo Emerson, a transcendentalist
- Octavius Frothingham, the FRA's first president and its most famous figure
- William C. Gannett, a member of the FRA executive committee and a financial supporter
- Thomas Wentworth Higginson, author of "The Sympathy of Religions"
- Samuel H. Morse, editor of The Radical
- Lucretia Mott, a Quaker active in the movements to abolish slavery and secure women's rights
- Robert Dale Owen, a spiritualist
- William J. Potter, the principal driving force within the FRA
- Benjamin F. Underwood, one of the leading non-theists of that time, along with Felix Adler
- Caroline Severance, elected as a vice president at the first FRA meeting
- David Atwood Wasson, a transcendentalist
- John Weiss, a Jewish Unitarian minister
- Isaac Mayer Wise, a leading rabbi of Reform Jews and one of the first set of FRA's directors
