= Octavius Frothingham =

American clergyman and author

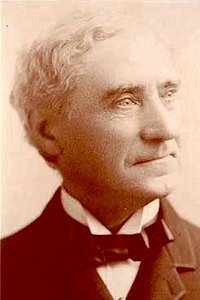
Octavius Brooks Frothingham

Octavius Brooks Frothingham (November 26, 1822 – November 27, 1895) was an American clergyman and author.

== Biography ==
He was born in Boston, Massachusetts, the son of Nathaniel Langdon Frothingham (1793–1870), a prominent Unitarian preacher, and through his mother's family he was related to Phillips Brooks. He graduated from Harvard College in 1843 and from the Divinity School in 1846. On March 23, 1847, he married Caroline Martha Curtis (February 5, 1825 - June 8, 1900).

=== Pastorates ===
He was pastor of the North Unitarian church of Salem, Massachusetts, from 1847 to 1855. He broke with this congregation over the issue of slavery. From 1855 to 1860, he was pastor of a new Unitarian society in Jersey City. There he gave up the Lord's Supper, thinking that it ministered to self-satisfaction.

It was as a radical Unitarian that he became pastor of another young church in New York City in 1860. The name of the church was initially the Third Unitarian Congregational Church. From the beginning, Frothingham belonged to the most radical wing of the Unitarians. Indeed, in 1864 he was recognized as leader of the radicals after his reply to Frederic Henry Hedge's address to the graduating students of the Divinity School on "Anti-Supernaturalism in the Pulpit."

In 1865, when he had practically given up transcendentalism, his church building was sold and his congregation began to worship in Lyric Hall under the name of the Independent Liberal Church, their connection with the Unitarian denomination being thereby sundered. In 1875, they moved to the Masonic Temple, but four years later ill-health compelled Frothingham's resignation, and the church dissolved. Paralysis threatened him, and he never fully recovered his health.Frederic Henry Hedge In 1881, he returned to Boston, and devoted himself to literary work until his death there.

=== Later life ===
While he was in New York, he was for a time art critic of the Tribune. his opinions were often unpopular. he was a thorough critic of the majority. He was an anti-slavery leader when abolition was not popular even in New England, a radical and rationalist when it was difficult for him to stay in the Unitarian Church, the first president of the Free Religious Association (1867) and an early disciple of Darwin and Spencer.

Frothingham wrote the first biography of philanthropist and abolitionist Gerrit Smith. While he said Smith had advance notice of Brown's planned raid, Smith's daughter, Elizabeth Smith Miller, ordered the books recalled and pages removed. A second edition was prepared under her supervision with the offending material altered.

Though faithful to his radical views, in later years, his judgement grew more generous and catholic. His sermons in New York were delivered to large audiences, averaging one thousand at the Masonic Temple, and were printed each week; Personally he seemed cold and distant, partly because of his impressive appearance, and partly because of his own modesty, which made him backward in seeking friendships.

He died at his home in Boston on November 27, 1895. He was cremated, and his ashes were buried at Mount Auburn Cemetery.

== Published works ==
- Stories from the Life of the Teacher (1863)
- a translation of Ernest Renan's Studies of Religious History and Criticism (1864)
- A Child's Book of Religion (1866), and other works of religious teaching for children
- several volumes of sermons
- Beliefs of Unbelievers (1876)
- The Cradle of the Christ: a Study in Primitive Christianity (1877)
- The Spirit of New Faith (1877)
- The Rising and the Setting Faith (1878), and other expositions of the new faith he preached
- Life of Theodore Parker (1874)
- Transcendentalism in New England (1876), which is largely biographical
- Gerrit Smith, a Biography (1878)
- George Ripley (1882), in the American Men of Letters series, a biography of George Ripley
- Memoir of William Henry Channing (1886)
- a life of David Atwood Wasson (1889)
- Boston Unitarianism: Study of the life and work of Nathaniel Langdon Frothingham, 1820-1850 (1890), really a biography of his father
- Recollections and Impressions, 1822-1890. G. P. Putnam's Sons. 1891.
