= Col. Thomas Wentworth Higginson House =

Historic house in Massachusetts, United States

- U.S. National Register of Historic Places
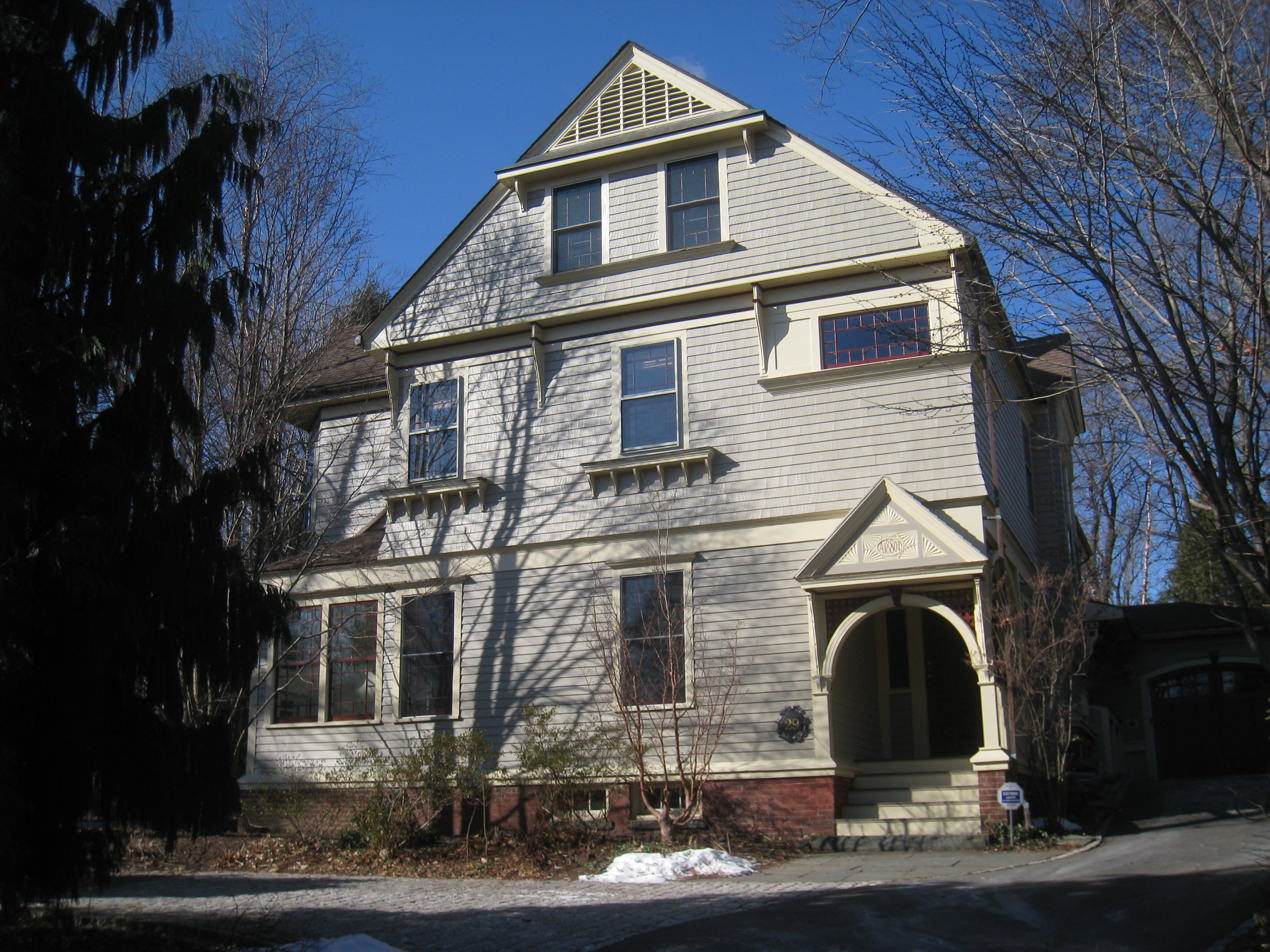

- Location within Massachusetts Location within the United States
- Location: 29 Buckingham Street, Cambridge, Massachusetts
- Coordinates: 42°22′49″N 71°7′50″W
- Built: 1880
- Architectural style: Queen Anne
- MPS: Cambridge MRA
- NRHP reference No.: 82001948
- Added to NRHP: April 13, 1982

The Col. Thomas Wentworth Higginson House is a historic house in Cambridge, Massachusetts. It is named after author, minister, and abolitionist Thomas Wentworth Higginson, who had it built and lived there for a time.

The house was built in 1880 and added to the National Register of Historic Places in 1982. It was the first home that Higginson ever owned. As he wrote to his sister shortly after moving in, "It is such inexpressible happiness to have at last a permanent home."

== See also ==
- National Register of Historic Places listings in Cambridge, Massachusetts
