= Walter Channing Jr. =

American wood sculptor and vinter (1940-2015)

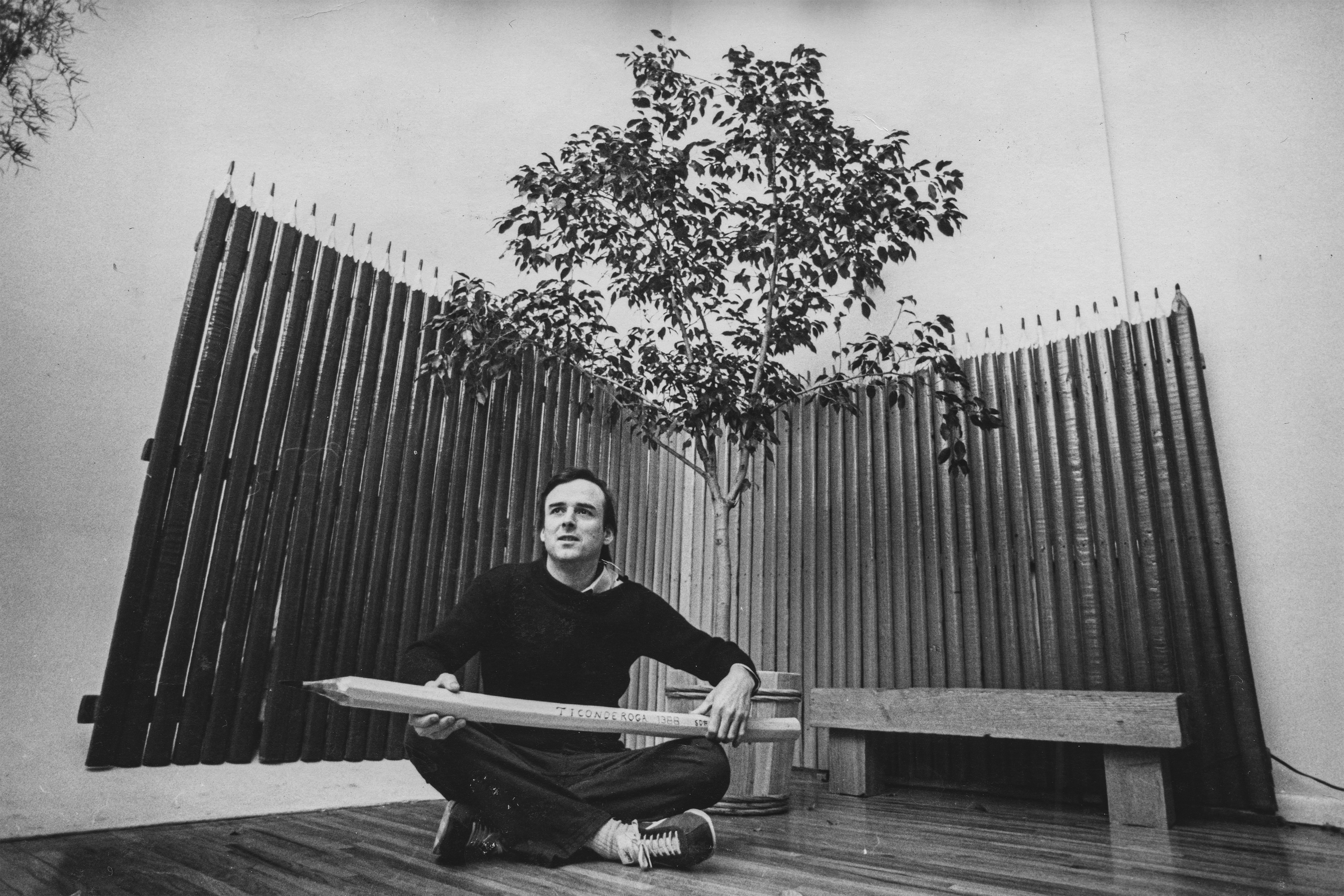
- Born: September 23, 1940; Dover, Massachusetts, U.S.
- Died: March 12, 2015 (aged 74); Southampton, New York, U.S.
- Style: Sculpture
- Spouse(s): Susan Stockard (m. 1963; div. 1967) Rosina Secco (died 1987) Molly Seagrave (m. 1990)
- Children: 4

Walter Channing Jr. (September 23, 1940 – March 12, 2015) was a wood sculptor, winemaker, and venture capitalist. He owned the Channing Daughters Winery in Bridgehampton, New York, where he planted his first Chardonnay vines in 1982.

== Early life and education ==
Channing was born in Dover, Massachusetts, to Walter Channing, a physician, and Eleine Taylor Channing, a painter and clothing designer. His older sister, Cornelia "Nina" Channing, went on to become a prominent researcher in the field of endocrinology and fertility.

Growing up in a wooded area, Channing developed a lifelong interest in trees. As a child, he ran a tree-surgery business. When he interviewed for a place at Harvard, he and the Dean of Freshman, Francis Skiddy von Stade Sr., who was about to buy a chainsaw, talked at length about the machines. “I knew I had a good interview because he was really interested,” Channing said. “So I got into Harvard because I knew a lot about chainsaws.”

Channing attended Milton Academy and Harvard University, where he earned a B.A. and an M.B.A. In his sophomore year, Channing was sent down for an early business venture: He had begun a rather profitable operation selling condoms to his classmates. (Harvard, at the time, had not yet coeducated.) He returned a year later to complete his studies, having spent some months traveling through Europe on a BMW motorcycle.

== Art ==
Channing's childhood interest in trees and woodworking was rekindled when, working on Rector Street in Lower Manhattan, he found that the city had dismantled a pier and was discarding its long-leaf yellow pine timbers. He set about collecting the wood, eventually sculpting the timbers into large-scale replicas of pencils, books, benches, and other objets d'art, the final forms of which often resonated playfully with their wooden materiality.

Later, he began salvaging fallen trees and discarded stumps from a dump in East Hampton. "No one ever does anything with a stump," he once told George Plimpton during an interview for The Paris Review, "yet a stump is a fascinating thing."

The first piece he carved was from a trunk the size of a telephone pole that had washed up on the shore near Fowler Beach Lane. He shaped it into a giant golf pencil and carved "THE MAIDSTONE CLUB" into the side – "as if the pencil had just washed up on the shore," he said. The piece, which was carved in place on the beach since it was too large to move, was stolen before he could carry it away.

In 1977, Channing bought a potato farm in Bridgehampton, off Scuttlehole Road. While clearing the property, he saved a number of uprooted trees – mostly oak – and decided to plant them back into the earth upside-down. "I don't look at a tree as an object that necessarily has to be rightside up," he said.

Channing estimated that only one in one hundred trees was suitable to be turned upside down to any effect. The others he turned into pillars, pilasters, and a range of other sculptures, including trompe l'oeil wood-carved tapestries, hundreds of pencils, and "an octopus and a sphinx in consort," among many other forms.

In a 1994 interview with The Paris Review, Channing explained his fascination with the medium:

Historically, wood doesn't survive as well. It's surprising that even something preserved can actually – depending on what's in the wood – decay. It's also unpredictable, whereas stone and alabaster and marble are predictable and very linear. You don't discover odd things in them as you work. But a wood person has to be very non-linear. Ready for anything. A sculpture can change from one thing to another. I never scavenge a large piece of wood knowing what I'm going to do with it. After being with the big piece of wood for a while, the idea occurs.

Channing's work has been shown at the OK Harris Gallery, the Webb and Parsons Gallery, the Handschin Gallery in Basel, the Indianapolis Museum of Fine Arts, the Root Art Center at Hamilton College, the Squibb Gallery in Princeton, the Elaine Benson and Louise Himmelfarb Galleries, the Louis K. Meisel Gallery at Outward Bound, and at the Century Association's Sculpture Show in New York City.

In a 1983 profile in New York Magazine, Channing said: "At times, I like making money, I like medicine, I like being successful. But the only thing I really think is important is art. It's not even a close call. I thirst for the challenge of becoming an important sculptor. There's no chance for immortality as a businessman."

== Business ==
Channing began his career in computer programming, working for Honeywell and Raytheon.

In 1968, with a partner, Barry Weinberg, Channing founded Channing, Weinberg & Co., Inc., a management consulting firm for pharmaceutical, diagnostic, medical device and biotechnology companies. The company was the leading strategy consultant to the health-equipment industry. It also sponsored In Vivo, a bi-monthly publication on business and medicine.

In 1983, Channing and Weinberg formed a separate venture-capital partnership, C.W. Group, that specialized in new medical technology. At the time it was the largest venture-capital fund devoted exclusively to investments in health-care companies.

Channing was a director of many of the companies launched by his firm, including GMIS Inc., VelQuest Corporation, Plexxikon, and Care Advantage. He also served on the board of Outward Bound.

Channing was a member of the Venture Advisory Committee of the Brigham and Women's Hospital in Boston and the Harvard Chan Research Center on Causes and Prevention of Cardiovascular Disease at the Harvard T. H. Chan School of Public Health.

== Personal life ==
In 1963, while an undergraduate at Harvard, Channing married a young aspiring actress named Susan Stockard, then a student at Radcliffe College. The two divorced in 1967, but Stockard kept the surname, eventually dropping her first name and going simply by Stockard Channing. His second wife, Rosina Secco, was a Uruguayan graphic designer. The couple had two daughters, Francesca and Isabella, before Secco died in 1987 from complications of cancer.

Channing was married to Molly Seagrave Channing from 1990 until his death in 2015. The couple raised four daughters: Francesca Channing-Secco, Isabella Channing-Secco, Sylvia Channing, and Cornelia "Nina" Channing.

Channing's ancestors include William Ellery Channing, the preacher and father of the Unitarian denomination in America; transcendentalist poet William Ellery Channing (the former's nephew); and William Ellery, a signer of the United States Declaration of Independence. His great, great, great-grandfather, Walter Channing, was among the first doctors to use anesthesia during childbirth and co-founded the Boston Lying-In Hospital (now Brigham and Women's), which provided obstetric care to poor women.
