= Blanche Mary Channing =

American writer of children's literature (1860–1902)

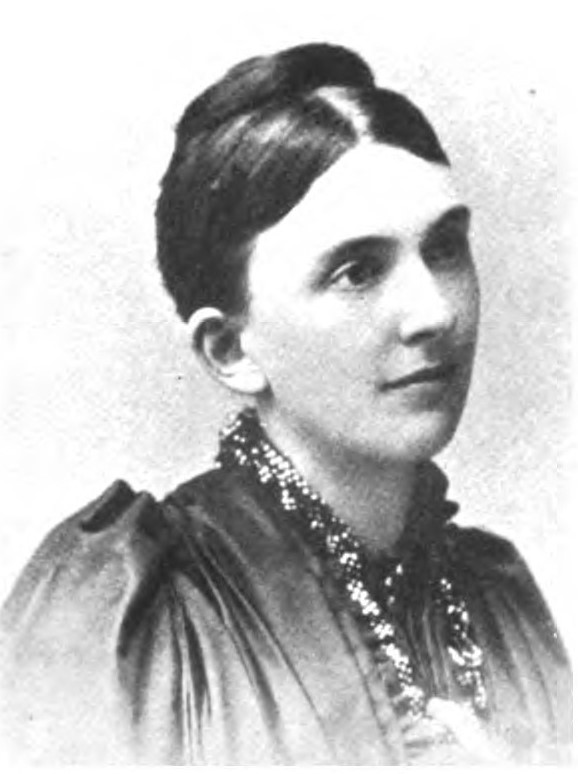
- Born: February 26, 1860
- Died: August 9, 1902 (aged 42) Boston, Massachusetts, US
- Resting place: Prospect Hill Cemetery (Brattleboro, Vermont)
- Occupation: Poet and writer
- Genre: Children's literature
- Relatives: William Henry Channing (father); Francis Channing, 1st Baron Channing of Wellingborough (brother)

Blanche Mary Channing (February 26, 1860 – August 9, 1902) was a poet and writer of juvenile fiction.

== Early life ==
Blanche Mary Channing was born on February 26, 1860. She was the daughter of Julia Maria (née Allen) and William Henry Channing, a Unitarian clergyman in England and America. Her brother was Francis Allston Channing, later the 1st Baron Channing of Wellingborough and a member of the British Parliament.

Her great-uncle was William Ellery Channing the foremost Unitarian preacher in the 19th century. Other notable greatuncles include physician and Harvard professor Walter Channing and Havard professor of rhetoric Edward Tyrrel Channing. In addition, her first cousin once-removed was the transcendentalist poet William Ellery Channing.

== Career ==
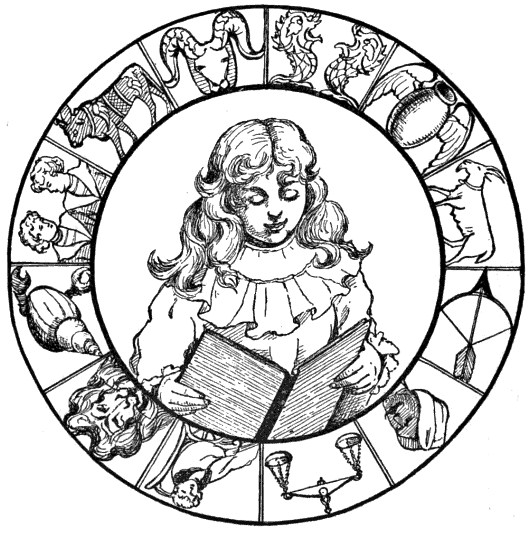
Zodiac Stories illustration

Channing was a writer and poet, known for her children's books. Her poems were popular during the Spanish–American War era and were published in Time magazine and newspapers such as The Boston Journal. Her last novel for children, The Balaster Boys, was released shortly before her death in 1902.

However, her children's books Zodiac Stories (1899), Winifred West (1901), and Lullaby Castle and Other Poems (1902) were her best-known works. She also provided illustrations to go with Zodiac Stories, a short story collection that explored the customs from different countries.

== Personal life ==
Lullaby Castle; and Other Poems

Channing lived in Brookline, Massachusetts. She was involved in the anti-vivisection movement to protect animals and was considered an "intensely religious Liberal". She died on August 9, 1902, in the Massachusetts General Hospital in Boston from an illness after being chilled during a boating outing in Nahant a few weeks prior. Her funeral was held at Emmanual Church on Newberry Street in Boston on August 12, 1902. She was buried in Prospect Hill Cemetery in Brattleboro, Vermont.

== Publications ==
- Zodiac Stories. Blanche Mary Channing, illustrator. New York: E. P. Dutton & Company (1899)
- Winifred West, A Story. Chase Emerson, illustrator. Boston: W. A. Wilde Company, 1901.
- Lullaby Castle and Other Poems. Boston: Little, Brown, and Company, 1901.
- The Balaster Boys. Frank T. Merrill, illustrator. Boston: W. A. Wilde Company, 1902.
