= Irene Savidge =

English factory worker and subject of police interrogation scandal (1905–1985)

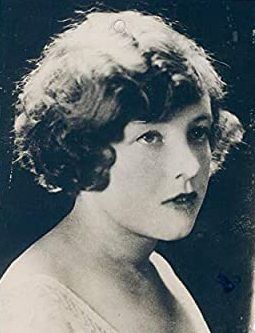
- Born: Irene Marjorie Savidge; 9 June 1905; Tottenham
- Died: 26 March 1985 (aged 79); Minehead
- Other name: Irene
- Occupation: Factory worker
- Known for: Scandal about police treatment
- Spouse: Frank Gentle

Irene "Marjorie" Savidge became Irene Gentle (9 June 1905 – 26 March 1985) was a British factory worker and subject of police interrogation who became involved in a scandal. A charge of indecency against her and Sir Leo Chiozza Money was dismissed by magistrates, but she was later detained again and subjected to a five-hour interrogation by male officers. Her complaints led to a public inquiry concerning police procedures and later a royal commission.

== Life ==
Savidge was born in Tottenham in 1905. She became a radio valve-tester in New Southgate and was engaged to Frank Gentle.

In November 1927, she was introduced to the 57 year old Sir Leo Chiozza Money who was married and had been a government minister. Over the next few months they would go out together to the theatre or for dinner. Savidge's parents, Alice and John Savidge were aware of their friendship. On 23 April 1928, they went for a meal together and afterwards they went to Hyde Park. Officers of the Metropolitan Police arrested them, claiming that they were engaged in mutual masturbation and that Money's genitals were in view. Money claimed that he had been offering Savidge advice on her career. They were both arrested and charged with indecent behaviour, but the case was dismissed by the Marlborough Street magistrate, who awarded costs of £10 against the police.

At the time of his arrest, Money protested to the police that he was "a man of substance" and, once in custody, was permitted to telephone the Home Secretary, Sir William Joynson-Hicks. The two were released and then the Director of Public Prosecutions, Sir Archibald Bodkin suspected police perjury and asked for further investigation. Bodkin appointed an experienced officer Chief Inspector Alfred C. Collins to investigate.

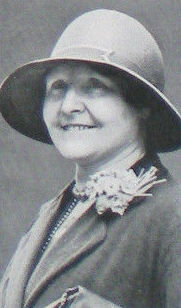
Inspector of Women Police Lilian Wyles helped escort Savidge for questioning but she was dismissed

On 15 May, Savidge was collected from work by two officers, one being Lilian Wyles, and taken for interrogation, which lasted some five hours. It was conducted without a female officer being present, since Wyles was told to leave by Collins. Savidge was required to show the police her petticoat, whose colour and brevity they duly noted and at a certain point Collins caressed her knee.

Savidge complained about her treatment and there followed an adjournment debate in the House of Commons on 17 May 1928, initiated by Labour MP, Tom Johnston. Joynson-Hicks established a public inquiry under Sir John Eldon Bankes (a retired Lord Justice of Appeal), which quickly became known as the Savidge Inquiry and the press was clear that it was the police who were on trial for their behaviour. The inquiry criticised the excessive zeal of the police, but also exonerated Savidge's interrogators of improper conduct. However, the Royal Commission on Police Powers and Procedure was then set up between September 1928 and March 1929, and this led to reforms in the way that the police dealt with female suspects. It also enabled a number of public figures to articulate their view that the police should primarily enforce law and order, rather than "trying to be censors of public morals".

In August 1928 it was reported that Savidge was considering offers to appear on the stage. Savidge married Frank Gentle in 1929. He had stood by her through the scandal. She died in the hospital in Minehead in 1985.
