= Lilian Wyles =

- Lilian Wyles, in the beginning of her career as a police officer in the United Kingdom, 1919
- Born: Lilian Mary Elizabeth Wyles; 31 August 1885; Bourne, Lincolnshire England
- Died: 13 May 1975 (aged 89); Penzance, Cornwall, England
- Occupations: constable, police detective chief inspector, author, nurse
- Employer: London Metropolitan Police

Lilian Mary Elizabeth Wyles (31 August 1885 – 13 May 1975) was an English female police officer who was among the first officers to take statements from female and juvenile assault victims, rather than relying on "assistants".

== Early life ==
Lilian Wyles was the daughter of Joseph Wyles a brewer in Bourne, Lincolnshire. After her education at Thanet Hall, Margate, and a finishing school in Paris, Wyles broke off the legal studies she had begun at her father's instigation, to serve as a hospital nurse during the First World War.

== Career ==
Lilian Wyles started her police career in February 1919 as one of three sergeants in the Metropolitan Women Police Patrols, covering Central London and the East End but without the power of arrest. The patrols met with scorn from male policemen and from members of the public, "Daunted at first, Wyles became accustomed to her visibility as another London sight, 'along with the Tower and Westminster Abbey'. People stopped and commented within earshot: 'How queer.' 'How unwomanly.' 'Not quite nice, do you think?'" However, they were given tasks such as escorting lost children. Largely thanks to her efforts, the patrols women were given attested status within the Metropolitan Police in 1923, i.e. with the power of arrest. As one of the first women in such a position, her relations with male colleagues were uneasy, although she enjoyed the confidence of the chief constable of the CID, Frederick Porter Wensley, until his retirement in 1929.

Wyles was instrumental in making it a task for women policemen, not of outside "assistants" to take statements from women in cases of sexual assault, as "detailed knowledge of the rules of evidence was required for a statement to be both useful and admissible. In 1922 Wyles was given responsibility for the taking of statements in all cases involving children and young girls that arose north of the Thames....".

Greater respect came in 1928, after the part she took in a case involving alleged sexual misconduct by Leo Chiozza Money and Irene Savidge, despite being initially spurned by Chief Inspector Alfred Collins, who was in charge of the case.

Lilian Wyles was promoted to chief inspector in 1932. She served for 30 years, and only took one sick day. Wyles retired to Penzance, Cornwall, in 1949. There she wrote her memoirs, A Woman at Scotland Yard: Reflections on the Struggles and Achievements of Thirty Years in the Metropolitan Police.

== Death ==
Lilian Wyles died unmarried in Cornwall on 13 May 1975. After 44 years in an unmarked grave, her resting place was eventually given a special blessing and a new gravestone at Sennen, Cornwall on 10 March 2019, one hundred years after she first joined the Women's police patrols in London.

In March 2023, she was one of a number of notable women with a connection to Grantham honoured by South Kesteven District Council.
