= East Northamptonshire (constituency) =

Parliamentary constituency in the United Kingdom, 1885–1918

- Former county constituency for the House of Commons

1885–1918
- Seats: one
- Created from: South Northamptonshire, North Northamptonshire
- Replaced by: Wellingborough and Kettering

East Northamptonshire was a county constituency in Northamptonshire, which returned one Member of Parliament (MP) to the House of Commons of the Parliament of the United Kingdom.

The constituency was created by the Redistribution of Seats Act 1885 for the 1885 general election, and abolished for the 1918 general election.

== Boundaries ==
1885–1918: The Sessional Division of Wellingborough, and part of the Sessional Division of Kettering (the parishes of Broughton, Cransley, Kettering and Pytchley).

== Members of Parliament ==
Election	Member	Party
1885	Francis Channing	Liberal
1910	Leo Chiozza Money	Liberal
1918	constituency abolished	

== Election results ==
Decades:	1880s; 1890s; 1900s; 1910s

=== Elections in the 1880s ===
Channing

General election 1885: East Northamptonshire
Party	Candidate	Votes	%	±%
Liberal	Francis Channing	5,414	61.7	
Conservative	Richmond Ramsden	3,359	38.3	
Majority		2,055	23.4	
Turnout		8,773	90.5	
Registered electors		9,691		
Liberal win (new seat)				

General election 1886: East Northamptonshire
Party	Candidate	Votes	%	±%
Liberal	Francis Channing	4,428	59.5	−2.2
Conservative	Leopold Agar-Ellis	3,012	40.5	+2.2
Majority		1,416	19.0	−4.4
Turnout		7,440	76.8	−13.7
Registered electors		9,691		
Liberal hold		Swing	−2.2	

=== Elections in the 1890s ===
General election 1892: East Northamptonshire
Party	Candidate	Votes	%	±%
Liberal	Francis Channing	5,832	57.3	−2.2
Conservative	William Potter	4,348	42.7	+2.2
Majority		1,484	14.6	−4.4
Turnout		10,180	88.1	+11.3
Registered electors		11,559		
Liberal hold		Swing	−2.2	

General election 1895: East Northamptonshire
Party	Candidate	Votes	%	±%
Liberal	Francis Channing	6,177	55.5	−1.8
Conservative	Herbert Lush-Wilson	4,961	44.5	+1.8
Majority		1,216	11.0	−3.6
Turnout		11,138	88.9	+0.8
Registered electors		12,526		
Liberal hold		Swing	−1.8	

=== Elections in the 1900s ===
General election 1900: East Northamptonshire
Party	Candidate	Votes	%	±%
Liberal	Francis Channing	7,003	55.7	+0.2
Conservative	John Parker	5,563	44.3	−0.2
Majority		1,440	11.4	+0.4
Turnout		12,566	84.5	−4.4
Registered electors		14,865		
Liberal hold		Swing	+0.2	

General election 1906: East Northamptonshire
Party	Candidate	Votes	%	±%
Liberal	Francis Channing	9,017	62.5	+6.8
Conservative	Arthur de Capell-Brooke	5,414	37.5	−6.8
Majority		3,603	25.0	+13.6
Turnout		14,431	85.6	+1.1
Registered electors		16,862		
Liberal hold		Swing	+6.8	

=== Elections in the 1910s ===
General election January 1910: East Northamptonshire
Party	Candidate	Votes	%	±%
Liberal	Francis Channing	8,679	56.1	−6.4
Conservative	Arthur de Capell-Brooke	6,802	43.9	+6.4
Majority		1,877	12.2	−12.8
Turnout		15,481	88.6	+3.0
Liberal hold		Swing	−6.4	

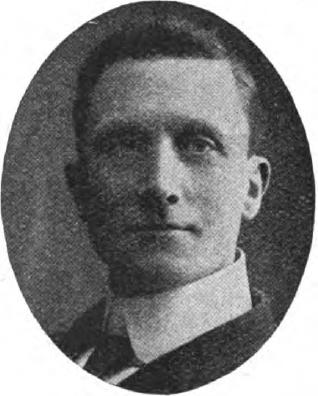
Richards

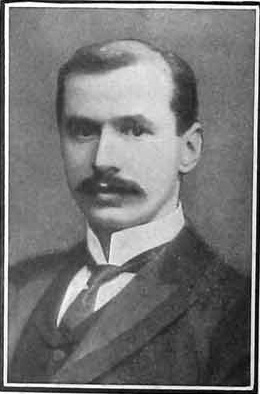
Money

General election December 1910: East Northamptonshire
Party	Candidate	Votes	%	±%
Liberal	Leo Chiozza Money	7,430	47.8	−8.3
Conservative	Arthur de Capell-Brooke	6,676	43.0	−0.9
Independent Labour	Thomas Frederick Richards	1,431	9.2	New
Majority		754	4.8	−7.4
Turnout		15,537	88.9	+0.3
Liberal hold		Swing	−8.3	

General Election 1914–15:

Another General Election was required to take place before the end of 1915. The political parties had been making preparations for an election to take place and by July 1914, the following candidates had been selected;

- Liberal: Leo Chiozza Money
- Unionist: C.J.O. Mansell
- Labour: R.J. Davies
