= Leo Chiozza Money =

Italian-born economic theorist

Sir Leo Chiozza Money
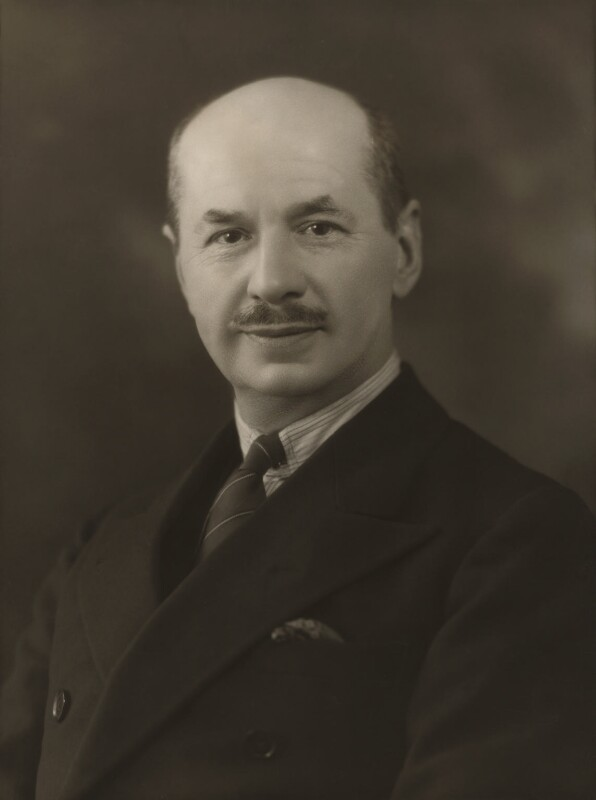
- Money in 1931

Member of Parliament for East Northamptonshire
- In office 3 December 1910 – 14 December 1918
- Preceded by: Sir Francis Channing, Bt
- Succeeded by: Constituency abolished

Member of Parliament for Paddington North
- In office 12 January 1906 – 15 January 1910
- Preceded by: Sir John Aird, Bt
- Succeeded by: Arthur Strauss

Personal details
- Born: Leone Giorgio Chiozza; 13 June 1870 Genoa, Kingdom of Italy
- Died: 25 September 1944 (aged 74) Bramley, Surrey, England
- Party: Liberal
- Spouse: Gwendoline Stevenson
- Children: 1

Sir Leo George Chiozza Money (born Leone Giorgio Chiozza, Italian pronunciation: [leˈoːne ˈdʒordʒo ˈkjoddza]; 13 June 1870 – 25 September 1944) was an Italian-born economic theorist who moved to Britain in the 1890s, where he made his name as a politician, journalist and author. In the early years of the 20th century his views attracted the interest of two future Prime Ministers, David Lloyd George and Winston Churchill. After a spell as Lloyd George's parliamentary private secretary, he was a Government minister in the latter stages of the First World War. In later life the police's handling of a case in which he and factory worker Irene Savidge were acquitted of indecent behaviour aroused much political and public interest. A few years later he was convicted of an offence involving another woman.

== Background and early career ==
Money was born in Genoa, Italy. His father was Anglo-Italian and his mother English. He was educated privately and, in 1903, largely anglicised his name, appending "Money" for what Lloyd George's biographer John Grigg has described as "eponymous reasons". He and his English wife Gwendoline had a daughter, Gwendoline Doris, born in 1896.

=== Economic publications ===
In London, Money established himself as a journalist, becoming especially noted for his use of statistical analysis. He has sometimes been referred to as a "New Liberal" economist. From 1898 to 1902 he was managing editor of Henry Sell's Commercial Intelligence, a journal devoted to the cause of free trade, which Money further championed in his books British Trade and the Zollverein Issue (July 1902) and Elements of the Fiscal Problem (1903). These were timely given the increasingly fervent political and public debate about Imperial Preference, a cause that led Joseph Chamberlain to resign from Arthur Balfour's Conservative government in 1903. Money argued that, although nobody was proposing a true "British Zollverein or Imperial Customs Union ... an imperial nation like ours cannot afford to benefit the colonies by giving a tariff preference to their products, for ... they cannot supply them in sufficient quantities to support our industries and people". His thinking appears to have had some influence on Winston Churchill, then a Conservative Member of Parliament (MP), who crossed to the Liberal Party in 1904 ostensibly because of his Free Trade principles; however, in later correspondence with Money, Churchill probably overstated the extent of his influence. Even so, Churchill told Money plainly in a letter in 1914 that he was "a master of efficient statistics and no one states a case with more originality or force".

==== Riches and Poverty (1905) ====
In 1905 Money published the work for which he became most noted, Riches and Poverty. This analysis of the distribution of wealth in the United Kingdom, which he revised in 1912, proved influential and was widely quoted by socialists, Labour politicians and trade unionists. The future Labour Prime Minister, Clement Attlee, whose government (1945–51) established the modern welfare state, recalled that, while he was working at a boys' club at Haileybury, he had spent an evening studying Riches and Poverty. Among other things, Money claimed that 87% of private property was owned by 883,000 people (or 4.4 million if families and dependents were included), while the remaining 13% was shared between 38.6 million. These and other calculations were contested at the time as taking insufficient account of age and family structures, but were frequently cited as the best available figures of their kind. Money sought also to quantify Britain's middle class and its per capita wealth, calculating that 861,000 people in 1905 and 917,000 in 1912 owned property worth between £500 and £50,000, although, allowing for four dependents per property owner, the per capita figure was less than £1,000. In general his findings pointed to the modest size of most middle-class fortunes in Edwardian times, a picture broadly consistent with calculations made by Robert Giffen and Michael Mulhall in the 1880s (although Money took the view that business wealth was becoming increasingly concentrated in a few hands, whereas, towards the end of the 19th century, Giffen and others, such as Leone Levi, had concluded that such wealth was being spread more widely).

Around this time, Money sometimes shared Fabian platforms with such like-minded thinkers as Sidney Webb and H. G. Wells.

== Political career ==
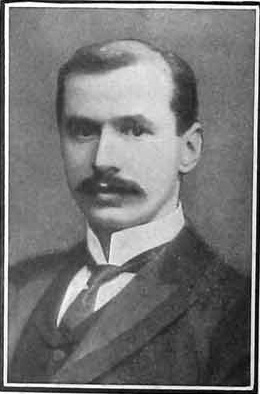
Leo Money, in 1906

At the 1906 general election, in which the Liberal Party won a landslide victory, Money became Liberal MP for Paddington North. A future Conservative Lord Chancellor, F.E. Smith (later Lord Birkenhead), who also entered Parliament in 1906, poured sarcasm on the Free Trade aspects of Money's campaign (as he did on those of others), claiming that "with an infinitely just appreciation of his own controversial limitations, [Money] relied chiefly on the intermittent exhibition of horse sausages as a witty, graceful and truthful sally at the expense of the great German nation"

Money lost his seat at the January 1910 election, fought principally on the issue of the "People's Budget" delivered by Lloyd George as Chancellor of the Exchequer in 1909, but in December 1910 was elected for East Northamptonshire in the second general election of that year. He held that seat until 1918.

=== Protégé of Lloyd George ===
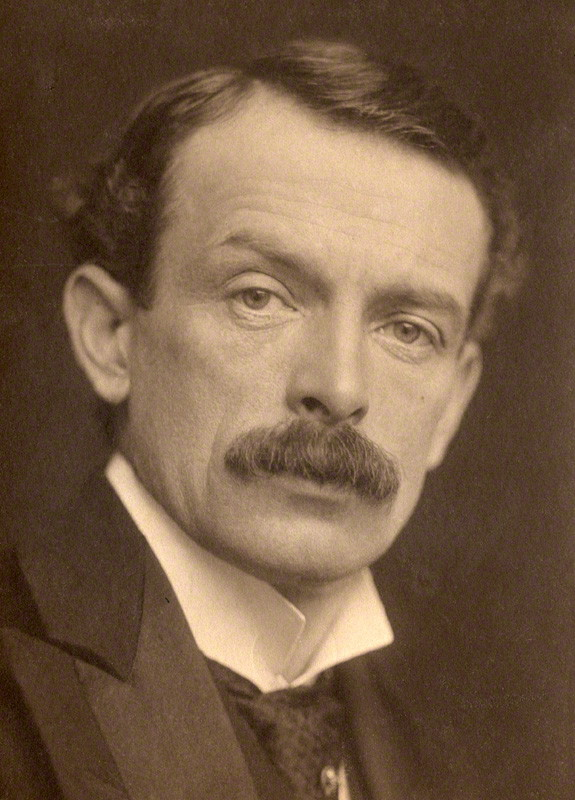
David Lloyd George in 1908

Lloyd George, who became Chancellor in 1908, valued Money's ability to develop innovative ideas; in 1911 he thanked him specifically for his "magnificent service" in relation to the new national insurance scheme and the following year contributed an introduction to his study of the Act and its purpose, published as Insurance Versus Poverty. In 1912 Money was active also in following up the sinking of the RMS Titanic, soliciting from the President of the Board of Trade (Sydney Buxton) an early breakdown of the number of passengers saved by class and gender. The figures showed, among other things, that, while 63% of first class passengers had survived, only 25% in third class had done so, including a mere 16 of 767 men in third class.

Despite Money's apparent alignment with Lloyd George, he produced various articles early in 1914 that drew attention to reductions in naval expenditure at a time when Germany was increasing such spending. He appears to have received private assistance in this regard from Churchill, who by then had a vested interest as First Lord of the Admiralty. Churchill offered Money flattering encouragement, while his office supplied him with various statistics (making clear, however, that such data were already available in published documents). In thanking Money for his articles, Churchill added that he was "keeping the proof to encourage the Chancellor [i.e. Lloyd George]"

When Lloyd George became Minister of Munitions in 1915, during the First World War, he appointed Money as his parliamentary private secretary (PPS). Money was knighted in the same year.

In December 1916 Lloyd George replaced Asquith as Prime Minister. Money was initially Parliamentary Secretary (a junior ministerial post) for both pensions and shipping in the re-organised coalition government, although he held the former portfolio for only two weeks, later claiming, rather improbably, that he had "drafted the new Pensions scheme of 1917".

=== Ministry of Shipping ===
Money's Minister (or Controller) at the new Ministry of Shipping was Sir Joseph Maclay, a Scottish shipowner who, unusually, sat in neither House of Parliament, as a result of which Money was the ministry's spokesman in the Commons (with his own PPS, Thomas Owen Jacobsen). Maclay, who was himself strong-willed and very self-disciplined, at first resisted Money's appointment, describing him to Lloyd George as "very clever – but impossible, [living] in an atmosphere of suspicion and distrust of everyone – satisfied only with himself and his own views". However, Lloyd George stuck by the appointment and, in the event, the two men appear to have worked in reasonable harmony. Among Money's particular achievements was developing the policy of concentrating British merchant shipping in the North Atlantic, allowing it to be better defended against German U-boats and leaving transport of goods around the world to ships of other nationalities. By the time of the Zeebrugge raid in April 1918, the use of convoys had largely contained the threat from U-boats, with every troopship of American reinforcements over the previous two months having arrived safely.

=== Labour Party candidate and the Sankey Commission ===
After the war Money left the Liberal Party for Labour, principally over the issues of nationalisation and redistribution of wealth through taxation which, in contrast with most Liberals, he supported. He argued also that substantial investment in organisation and technology would be required to stem economic decline and regretted both the coalition's lack of commitment to free trade and intention to defer Home Rule for Ireland. Money resigned his government post shortly before the so-called "Coupon" election of 1918, in which, standing as a Labour candidate for South Tottenham, he lost by 853 votes to the Conservatives' Major Patrick Malone (who, because of local differences over his candidature, had not received the coalition coupon).

The following year Money was a member of the Royal Commission established under the Coal Industry Commission Act 1919 and led by Sir John Sankey, that examined the future of the coal-mining industry. He was one of three economists on the commission, all broadly favourable to the miners, the others being Sidney Webb and R. H. Tawney. Others were appointed from business and the trade unions. No agreement was reached and, when the commission reported in June 1919, it offered four separate approaches ranging from full nationalisation to untrammelled private ownership. The public impact of the report was such that, in Ben Travers' comic novel A Cuckoo in the Nest (1921), the Rev. Cathcart Sloley-Jones, under the illusion that he was addressing a member of parliament, "lowered his voice into a rather sinister whisper: 'What is Lloyd George's real view of the miners' report?'"

Money unsuccessfully fought the Stockport by-election for Labour in a seven-sided contest in 1920.

== Later life ==
Money did not hold ministerial office nor sit in Parliament again after 1918. Therefore, with Lloyd George being forced out as Prime Minister in 1922, his political career was effectively over by the early 1920s. He continued to work as a financial journalist and author, and contributed views in other ways. For example, in 1926 (the year of the General Strike), he criticised as "utterly humourless" a BBC radio play in which Father Ronald Knox offered an imaginary account of a revolution in Britain that included butchery in St. James's Park, London and the blowing up of the Houses of Parliament. He also published books of poems.

In his book, The Peril of the White (1925), Money addressed delicate issues relating to the racial make-up of colonial populations and the implications of a declining white European birth rate for their future governance. He maintained that "the European stock cannot presume to hold magnificent areas indefinitely, even while it refuses to people them, and to deny their use and cultivation to races that sorely need them". He emphasised also that "every ... act ... which denies respect to mankind of whatever race will have to be paid for a hundredfold".

By the mid-1930s, Money appeared to be showing some sympathy for the fascist dictators in Europe, regretting in particular Britain's hostility towards Benito Mussolini's Italy. Shortly before the Italian invasion of Abyssinia in 1935, he corresponded with Winston Churchill, praising him, among other things, for the measured tone of a speech in which Churchill had maintained that the quarrel with Italy was not one with Britain, but with the League of Nations. During the Second World War Money deplored British bombing of non-military targets in Germany, citing in 1943 Churchill's own denunciation of a "new and odious form of warfare" a few months before becoming Prime Minister in 1940.

However, in terms of their public profile, these various activities paled into insignificance compared to two rather bizarre episodes involving young women that brought Money into contact with the law. In 1928 he was acquitted of indecent behaviour with a woman in London's Hyde Park in a case that became a cause célèbre and had some influence on future handling by the police of such cases. Then, five years later, he was convicted on a similar charge following an incident in a railway compartment and fined a total of 50 shillings (£2.50).

=== The Savidge case ===
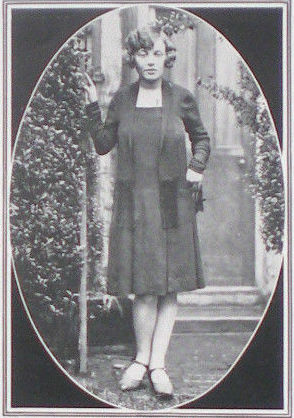
Irene Savidge in 1928

On the evening of St. George's Day, 23 April 1928, Money was in Hyde Park with Irene Savidge, a radio valve-tester from New Southgate in North London. Savidge was engaged to be married. A police constable spotted the exchange of what a later social historian described as "a rather chaste kiss". The police maintained that mutual masturbation was taking place, although Money claimed that he had been offering Savidge advice on her career. They were both arrested and charged with indecent behaviour, but the case was dismissed by the Marlborough Street magistrate, who awarded costs of £10 against the police.

At the time of his arrest, Money protested to the police that he was "not the usual riff-raff" but "a man of substance" and, once in custody, was permitted to telephone the Home Secretary, Sir William Joynson-Hicks. The police suspected that his and Savidge's acquittal was an "establishment" conspiracy, leading the Director of Public Prosecutions, Sir Archibald Bodkin, to authorise them to detain Savidge for further questioning. Her subsequent interrogation, after she had been detained at her place of work, lasted some five hours and was conducted without a female officer being present. Lilian Wyles, one of the officers to collect her, and who expected to be present during the questioning, was told to leave by Chief Inspector Alfred C. Collins, who led the interview. Savidge was required to show the police her pink petticoat, the colour and brevity of which they duly noted and, at a certain point, Collins caressed her knee.

Savidge complained about her treatment and there followed an adjournment debate in the House of Commons on 17 May 1928, initiated by a Labour MP, Tom Johnston. Joynson-Hicks established a public inquiry under Sir John Eldon Bankes, a retired Lord Justice of Appeal, which criticised the excessive zeal of the police, but also exonerated Savidge's interrogators of improper conduct. However, the case did lead to reforms in the way that the police dealt with female suspects and enabled a number of public figures to articulate their view that the police should primarily enforce law and order, rather than "trying to be censors of public morals".

=== Railway incident and conviction ===
In September 1933 Money was travelling on the Southern Railway between Dorking and Ewell when, as A. J. P. Taylor put it in the relevant volume of the Oxford History of England, he "again conversed with a young lady". He was summonsed for taking hold of a shop girl named Ivy Buxton and kissing her face and neck. When Money appeared before Epsom magistrates on 11 September, he was fined £2 for his behaviour and a further 10 shillings (50p) for interfering with the comfort of other passengers.

== Publications ==
- Riches and poverty (1905)
- A Nation Insured (1912)
- The Triumph of Nationalization (1920)

== Sources ==
- Daunton, Martin. "Money, Sir Leo George Chiozza (1870–1944), politician and author" in Oxford Dictionary of National Biography
- Donaldson, William (2002). Brewer's Rogues, Villains & Eccentrics
- Grigg, John (2001). Lloyd George: War Leader 1916–1918
- Harris, Jose (1993). Private Lives, Public Spirit: Britain 1870–1914
- Pugh, Martin (2008). We Danced All Night: A Social History of Britain Between the Wars
- Taylor, A.J.P. (1965). The Oxford History of England: English History 1914–1945
- Toye, Richard (2007). Lloyd George and Churchill
- Leigh Rayment's Historical List of MPs

Parliament of the United Kingdom
| Preceded by Sir John Aird, Bt | Member of Parliament for Paddington North; 1906 – Jan. 1910 | Succeeded by Arthur Strauss |
| Preceded by Sir Francis Channing, Bt | Member of Parliament for East Northamptonshire; Dec. 1910 – 1918 | Constituency abolished |
