= John Weiss =

American author and clergyman (1818–1879)

The Reverend John Weiss
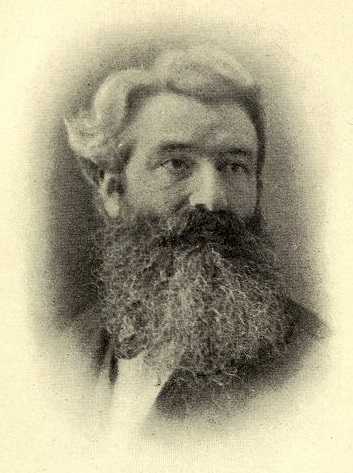
- John Weiss
- Born: June 28, 1818; Boston, Massachusetts, U.S.
- Died: March 9, 1879 (aged 60)
- Education: Harvard University; Harvard Divinity School

John Weiss (June 28, 1818 – March 9, 1879) was an American author and clergyman, an advocate of women's rights, as well as a noted abolitionist.

== Biography ==
Weiss was born in Boston. His father, a German Jew, was a barber in Worcester. He graduated at Harvard in 1837 and at the Harvard Divinity School in 1843, studying abroad in between. He then preached at Watertown, but withdrew on account of his anti-slavery opinions. He was pastor at New Bedford, Massachusetts, for a short time, resigning on account of the failure of his health. After several years of study and travel he resumed his pastorate in the Unitarian church at Watertown in 1859, remaining there until 1870.

On the issue of slavery, Weiss was an outspoken abolitionist. He was an advocate of woman's rights, a rationalist in religion, and a disciple of the transcendental philosophy. He delivered courses of lectures on "Greek Religious Ideas," "Humor in Shakespeare," and "Shakespeare's Women." Of his lectures on Greek religious ideas, Octavius B. Frothingham said: "They were the keenest interpretation of the ancient myths, the most profound, luminous, and sympathetic, I have met with."

== Works ==
He was the author of many reviews, sermons, and magazine articles on literary, biographical, social, and political questions. He also wrote:

- Life and Correspondence of Theodore Parker (2 vols., New York, 1864)
- American Religion (1871)

He edited and translated:

- Friedrich von Hardenberg, Henry of Ofterdingen (a romance, Boston, 1842)
- Friedrich Schiller, Philosophical and Æsthetic Letters and Essays (with an introduction, 1845)
- William Smith, Memoir of Johann G. Fichte (1846)
