= Channing Der =

American biologist

- Citizenship: USA
- Occupation: Professor
- Board member of: National Cancer Institute (NCI) Board of Scientific Counselors, Council Delegate for the Medical Sciences division of American Association for the Advancement of Science (AAAS), Pancreatic Cancer Action Network (PanCAN) (AACR)
- Awards: Sarah Graham Kenan Distinguished Professor; Fellow of the American Association for the Advancement of Science,

Academic background
- Education: University of California, Los Angeles University of California, Irvine

Academic work
- Discipline: Pharmacology, Cancer Cell Biology, Molecular Therapeutics

Channing Joseph Der is an American scientist and educator, and Sarah Graham Kenan Distinguished Professor of Pharmacology, at UNC Lineberger Comprehensive Cancer Center. Der is a Fellow of the American Association for the Advancement of Science, He is recognized for his work with the Ras oncoprotein and its role in human oncogenesis.

== Education ==
Der earned his B.S. in biology from the University of California, Los Angeles (1975) and his Ph.D. in microbiology from the University of California, Irvine (1981). He completed post-doctoral work at Harvard Medical School, Dana-Farber Cancer Institute.

== Research ==
Der has made contributions to the fields of molecular pharmacology and cancer cell biology. One early discovery was the presence of activated Ras oncogenes in human cancers in 1982, marking the identification of the very first cancer genes. RAS genes comprise the most frequently mutated oncogene family in human cancers. The pursuit of anti-RAS therapeutic strategies has been a major focus of his research studies.

A second was that RAS oncoprotein function is dependent on modification by a farnesyl isoprenoid lipid group. This discovery prompted intense pharmaceutical industry pursuit of inhibitors of the farnesyltransferase enzyme that catalyzes this lipid modification on RAS and other proteins. This has led to a current Phase 2 clinical trial using farnesyltransferase inhibitors to inhibit HRAS-driven head and neck squamous cell carcinomas. In collaborative studies with Francis Collins, MD (former Director, National Institutes of Health), he also demonstrated that these inhibitors corrected the protein defect that causes progeria, a disease of “rapid aging”. This discovery set the stage for the recent FDA approval of farnesyltransferase inhibitors as the only treatment for this rare childhood disease. A third finding is the discovery of a therapeutic approach that ERK inhibition increases pancreatic cancer addiction to autophagy. Autophagy, derived from the Greek meaning “eating of self”, is a process whereby cancer cells acquire the energy needed to maintain their high growth capacity. This autophagy connection led Der to initiate, together with clinicians at the MD Anderson Cancer Center, a new clinical trial evaluating the combination of the MEK inhibitor binimetinib with the autophagy inhibitor hydroxychloroquine in pancreatic cancer (NCT04132505).

== Awards and recognition ==
Der is a Fellow of the American Association for the Advancement of Science, a recipient of the NCI Outstanding Investigator Award, the University of North Carolina at Chapel Hill's Mentor Award, the Hyman L. Battle Distinguished Cancer Research Award, and the University of California, Irvine Distinguished Alumni Award. He is also recipient of an Einstein BIH Visiting Fellow Award.
