= David Atwood Wasson =

American minister and author (1823–1887)

David Atwood Wasson (1823–1887) was an American minister and Transcendentalist author, an essayist and poet. He was early influenced by Thomas Carlyle, an influence he would shed; he is usually regarded as a disciple of Ralph Waldo Emerson.

== Life ==
He was born in West Brooksville, Maine. He studied at Phillips Academy, Andover and Bowdoin College for just one year from 1845. After theological training at Bangor Theological Seminary, he became pastor at Groveland, Massachusetts, but only briefly after a conflict with his congregation. He then moved to Worcester, Massachusetts. He lost a position at the Medford Unitarian Church because of his abolitionist views.

He was appointed by the "28th Congregational Society" of Boston, and succeeded Unitarian radical Theodore Parker, who died in 1860, in 1865. In 1867 he became a founder of the Free Religious Association.

== Works ==
- The Radical Creed: A Discourse At The Installation Of Rev. David A. Wasson, As Minister of the Twenty Eighth Congregational Society of Boston, May 7, 1865. Delivered by the Pastor Elect (1865)
- Poems By David Atwood Wasson (1888)
- Beyond Concord; Selected Writings of David Atwood Wasson (1965), edited Charles H. Foster
