= Edward Tyrrel Channing =

American rhetorician

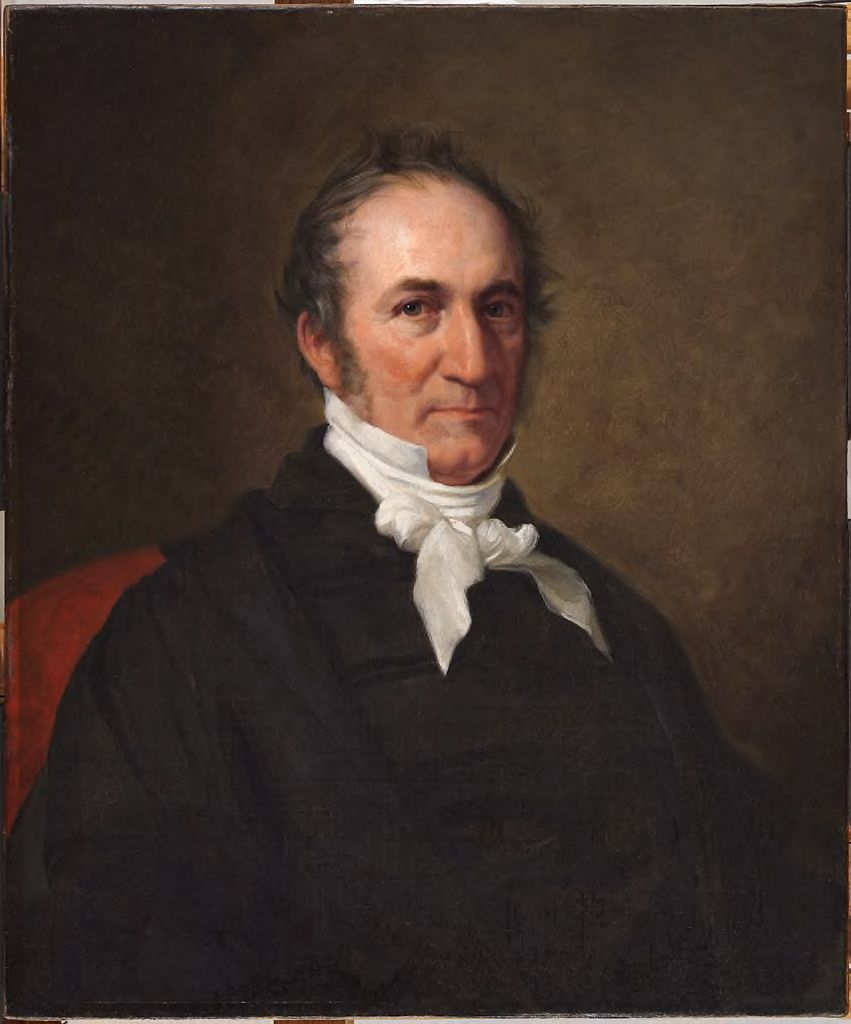
- Born: December 12, 1790; Newport
- Died: February 8, 1856 (aged 65)
- Alma mater: Harvard University
- Employer: Harvard University

Edward Tyrrel Channing (December 12, 1790 – February 8, 1856) was an American rhetorician. He was a professor at Harvard College, brother to William Ellery Channing and Walter Channing, and cousin of Richard Henry Dana Sr.

== Early life and education ==
Channing was born in Newport, Rhode Island, the son of William and Lucy (Ellery) Channing. In 1807, he graduated from Harvard College.

== Career ==
Channing began the practice of law in Boston, but devoted his attention chiefly to literature. From 1818–1819 he was the second editor of the North American Review after William Tudor (1779-1830), and remained a regular contributor through much of his life.

From 1819–1850, he taught at Harvard as the Boylston Professor of Rhetoric and Oratory, the position held by John Quincy Adams from 1806–1809. His students included the noted authors and speakers Ralph Waldo Emerson, Thomas Wentworth Higginson, Oliver Wendell Holmes Sr., James Russell Lowell, Charles Eliot Norton, Wendell Phillips, and Henry David Thoreau. Channing was elected a Fellow of the American Academy of Arts and Sciences in 1823.

== Personal life ==
Channing married Henrietta Ellery in 1826.

== Death and legacy ==
He died in Cambridge, Massachusetts, on February 8, 1856, at age 65. A memorial volume of his lectures was published in 1856 along with a memoir of Channing by Richard Henry Dana Jr.

== Selected works ==
- An oration, delivered July 4, 1817, at the request of the selectmen of the town of Boston, in commemoration of the anniversary of American independence, Boston: printed by Joseph T. Buckingham, Congress-Street, 1817.
- Lives of William Pinkney, William Ellery, and Cotton Mather, Boston : Hilliard, Gray; London : R. J. Kennett, 1836.
- Lectures on Rhetoric and Oratory, Boston : Ticknor and Fields, 1856.
- "Life of William Ellery," in The Library of American Biography, edited by Jared Sparks, vol. 6 New York: Harper & Brothers, 1848. 89–159.
- Lectures Read to the Seniors in Harvard College, Boston, 1856. Facsimile ed., introd. Charlotte Downey, 1997, Scholars' Facsimiles & Reprints, ISBN 978-0-8201-1502-3.
