= William Ellery Channing (poet) =

American poet (1817–1901)

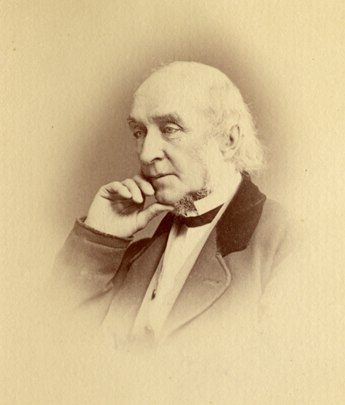
- Born: November 29, 1817; Boston, Massachusetts, United States
- Died: December 23, 1901 (aged 84); Concord, Massachusetts, United States
- Resting place: Sleepy Hollow Cemetery, Concord
- Occupation: Poet
- Spouse: Ellen K. Fuller Channing
- Children: 5, including Edward Perkins Channing
- Parent: Walter Channing
- Relatives: William Ellery Channing (uncle)

William Ellery Channing II (November 29, 1817 – December 23, 1901) was an American Transcendentalist poet, nephew and namesake of the Unitarian preacher Dr. William Ellery Channing. His uncle was usually known as "Dr. Channing", while the nephew was commonly called "Ellery Channing", in print. The younger Ellery Channing was thought brilliant but undisciplined by many of his contemporaries. Amos Bronson Alcott famously said of him in 1871, "Whim, thy name is Channing." Nevertheless, the Transcendentalists thought his poetry among the best of their group's literary products.

== Life and work ==
Channing was born in Boston, Massachusetts, to Dr. Walter Channing, a physician and Harvard Medical School professor. He attended Boston Latin School and later the Round Hill School in Northampton, Massachusetts, then entered Harvard University in 1834, but did not graduate. In 1839 he lived for some months in Woodstock, Illinois, in a log hut that he built; in 1840, he moved to Cincinnati. In the fall of 1842, he married Ellen Fuller, the younger sister of transcendentalist Margaret Fuller and they began their married life in Concord, Massachusetts, where they lived a half-mile north of The Old Manse as Nathaniel Hawthorne's neighbor.

Channing wrote to Thoreau in a letter: "I see nothing for you on this earth but that field which I once christened 'Briars'; go out upon that, build yourself a hut, and there begin the grand process of devouring yourself alive. I see no alternative, no other hope for you." Thoreau adopted this advice, and shortly after built his famous dwelling beside Walden Pond. Some speculation identifies Channing as the "Poet" of Thoreau's Walden; the two were frequent walking companions.

In 1843, he moved to a hill-top in Concord, some distance from the village, and published his first volume of poems, reprinting several from The Dial. Thoreau called his literary style "sublimo-slipshod". The printing of a compilation of these poems was subsidized by Samuel Gray Ward.

In 1844–1845, Channing separated from his family and restarted his wandering, unanchored life. He first spent some months in New York City as a writer for the Tribune, after which he made a journey to Europe for several months. In 1846 he returned to Concord and lived alone on the main street, opposite the house occupied by the Thoreau family and then by Alcott. During much of this time he had no fixed occupation, though for a while, in 1855–1856, he was one of the editors of the New Bedford Mercury. After enumerating his various wanderings, places of residence, and rare intervals of employment, his housemate Franklin Benjamin Sanborn wrote of him:

In all these wanderings and residences his artist eye was constantly seeking out the finest landscapes, and his sauntering habit was to take his friends and introduce them to scenery they could hardly have found for themselves. He showed Thoreau the loveliest recesses of the Concord woods, and of the two rivers that came slowly through them; he preceded Thoreau at Yarmouth and Truro and the Highland shore of Cape Cod; and he even taught Emerson the intimate charm of regions in Concord and Sudbury which he, the older resident and unwearied walker, had never beheld. ... In mountain-climbing and in summer visits to the wilder parts of New England he preceded Thoreau, being more at leisure in his youth, and less bound by those strict habits of study which were native to Thoreau all his life.

In 1873, Channing was the first biographer of Thoreau, publishing Thoreau, the Poet-Naturalist.

When visiting the Emersons in 1876, the young poet Emma Lazarus met Channing and accompanied him on a tour of some of the places Thoreau had loved, stating in her journal in regard to the friendship between Thoreau and Channing that

I do not know whether I was most touched by the thought of the unique, lofty character that had instilled this depth and fervor of friendship, or by the pathetic constancy and pure affection of the poor, desolate old man before me, who tried to conceal his tenderness and sense of irremediable loss by a show of gruffness and philosophy. He never speaks of Thoreau's death, but always "Thoreau's loss", or "when I lost Mr. Thoreau", or "when Mr. Thoreau went away from Concord"; nor would he confess that he missed him, for there was not a day, an hour, a moment, when he did not feel that his friend was still with him and had never left him. And yet a day or two after, when I sat with him in the sunlit wood, looking at the gorgeous blue and silver summer sky, he turned to me and said: "Just half the world died for me when I lost Mr. Thoreau. None of it looks the same as when I looked at it with him."

Channing gave Henry Thoreau's compass to Emma Lazarus.

=== Death ===
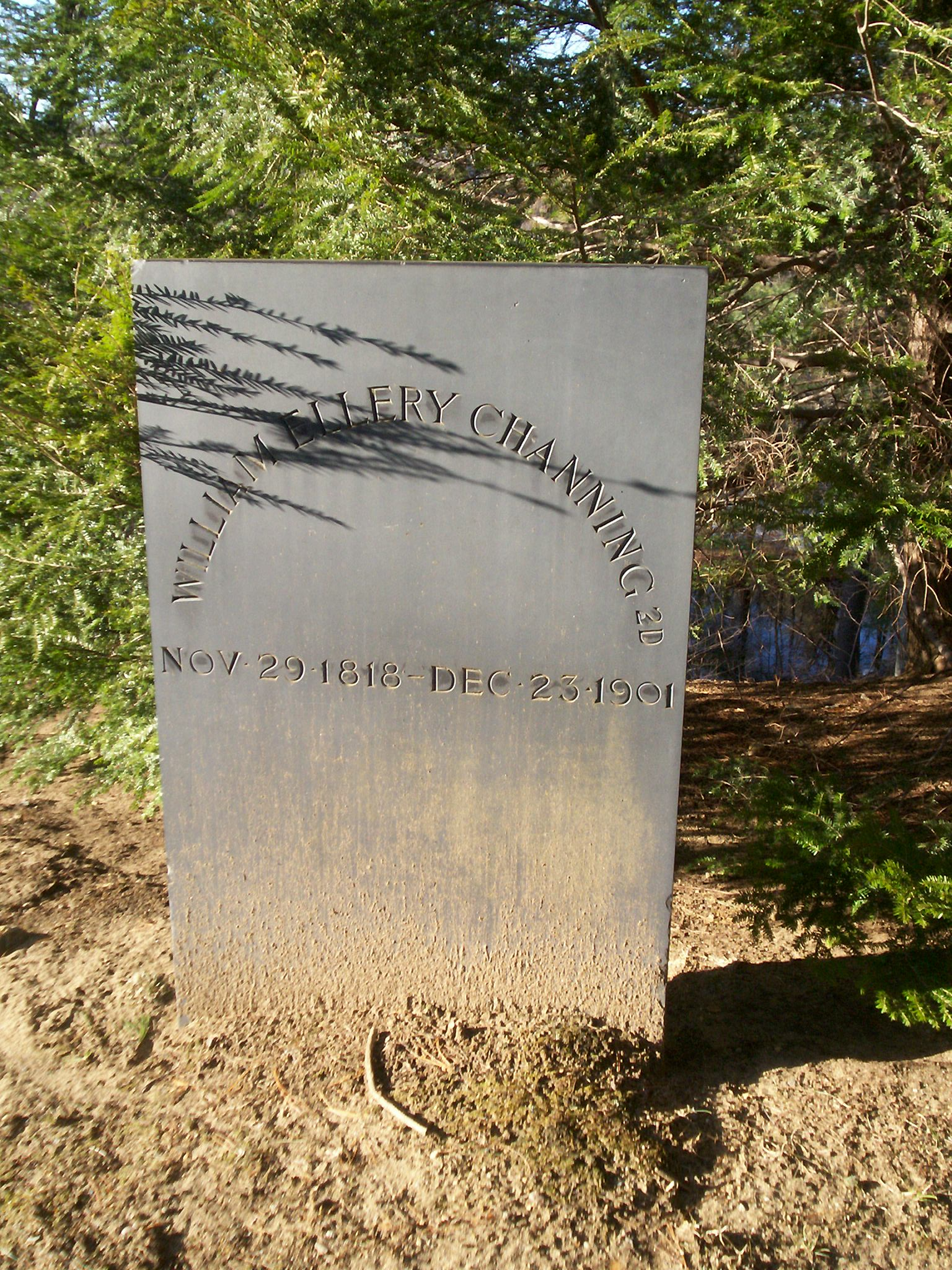
Channing's grave

Channing died December 23, 1901, in Concord, at the home of Franklin Benjamin Sanborn, where he had spent the final ten years of his life. He is buried at Sleepy Hollow Cemetery, Concord on Authors' Ridge directly facing his longtime friend Thoreau. Frank Sanborn paid for Channing's burial plot.

... as age came on and his chosen companions died, he withheld his steps from mount and stream and sea; would not sail his own Concord river, nor thread the woodpaths he once knew as well as the citizen knows his daily street; and died tranquilly at last, within sight of the hills and meadows he had loved to ramble across with Emerson, Hawthorne, or Thoreau, beside whose buried dust his own ashes will rest in the village cemetery.

In a July 19, 1902, Springfield Republican article, Frank Sanborn states,

This week the Channing lot in Sleepy Hollow cemetery received the ashes of the poet Ellery Channing, whose remains were cremated, at his request, last January, but not committed to earth till July 15. The only service was the reading above the grave of a Greek epitaph ... The stanza written by Channing for such an occasion half a century ago was also read, with a slight change, adapting it to the stately pine trees that surround his burial place, exactly opposite the grave of his friend Hawthorne:

O spare from all the luxury
A tear for one who may not weep!
Whose heart is like a wintry sea,
So still and cold and deep;
Nor shed that tear till he is laid
Beneath the fresh-dug turf to rest,
And o'er his grave the pine-tree's shade
That hides the song-bird's nest.

In a later Republican column, Sanborn informs:

I have lately come upon the Greek Iambics which I buried with the ashes of Channing in Sleepy Hollow cemetery; and I copy them here in English type, that they may not be wholly lost:

Entautha thapto son smikro teuchei spodon,
Aoide philtathie, on mele thallousa ze;
Kouphe soi chthon epaneuthe pesoi!

A word about the Greek: The first two lines mean: "Here I bury your ashes in a small container / dearest singer, whose songs live blossoming (i.e. blossom and live)". The third line is prose: "May the earth fall light upon you." The verses are faintly reminiscent of the well-known epigram of Callimachus to Heraclitus.

== Criticism ==
Critic Edgar Allan Poe was particularly harsh in reviewing Channing's poetry in a series of articles titled "Our Amateur Poets" published in Graham's Magazine in 1843. He wrote, "It may be said in his favor that nobody ever heard of him. Like an honest woman, he has always succeeded in keeping himself from being made the subject of gossip". (Note: In this article, Poe mistakes W. Ellery Channing to be the son of, rather than nephew of William E. Channing and voices his views as "we" (the Society in Baltimore) rather than "I".Poe, Edgar Allan. "William Ellery Channing".) A critic for the Daily Forum in Philadelphia agreed with Poe, though he was surprised Poe bothered reviewing Channing at all. He wrote:

Mr. Poe, the most hyper-critical writer of this meridian, cuts the poetry of William Ellery Channing Junior, if not into inches, at least into feet. Mr. C's poetry is very trashy, and we should as soon expect to hear Bryant writing sonnets on a lollypop as to see Mr. Poe gravely attempt to criticize the volume.

Nathaniel Hawthorne metaphorically appraised Channing's oeuvre as of particularly high quality, if uneven, in the short story "Earth's Holocaust".

== See also ==
- Blanche Mary Chaning
