= Walter Channing (physician) =

American physician (1786–1876)

- Born: April 15, 1786; Newport, Rhode Island, United States
- Died: July 27, 1876 (aged 90)
- Occupations: Physician; Professor of medicine

Walter Channing (April 15, 1786 – July 27, 1876) was an American medical doctor and professor of medicine. He was the brother of preacher William Ellery Channing and of fellow Harvard professor (of Rhetoric), Edward Tyrrel Channing. He was also the father of the poet William Ellery Channing. He was married to Eliza Wainwright Channing from 1831 until her death in 1834.

== Biography ==
Born in Newport, Rhode Island, Channing entered Harvard College in 1804 but was expelled because of his involvement in the "rotten cabbage brawl" at Harvard. After studying medicine in Boston and Philadelphia, he received his diploma from the University of Pennsylvania and then studied at the University of Edinburgh, receiving a degree there as well. He also studied at Guy's and St. Thomas's hospitals in London. He began to practice in Boston in 1812, and in the same year became lecturer on obstetrics at Harvard. He was the first professor of obstetrics and medical jurisprudence at Harvard University (then called Harvard College), a position he held from 1815 to 1854. In 1832, he co-founded the Boston Lying-in Hospital for destitute women, now Brigham and Women's Hospital. He became, in 1821, Dr. James Jackson's assistant as physician of the newly established Massachusetts General Hospital, and continued there for nearly twenty years. He was elected a Fellow of the American Academy of Arts and Sciences in 1818. He was one of the first American physicians to employ anesthesia during childbirth, and wrote a treatise in its favor, serving as the main American advocate of the practice at the time. He was a founder and first President of the Massachusetts Society for Aiding Discharged Prisoners in 1846. The MSADP continues to follow the same objectives today. Channing died in Brookline, Massachusetts.

== Works ==
- Address on the Prevention of Pauperism (1843)
- Treatise on Etherization in Child-birth, illustrated by 581 cases (1849)
- Professional Reminiscences of Foreign Travel (1851)
- New and Old (1851)
- Miscellaneous Poems (1851)
- A Physician's Vacation, or a Summer in Europe (1856)
- Reformation of Medical Science (1857)
