= Timeline of Extinction Rebellion actions =

Non-violent civil disobedience movement

Extinction Rebellion (XR), a 2018 UK-founded environmental movement, has since spread to the rest of Europe, the United States, and other countries, forming an international "non-violent civil disobedience" movement through mass protest. XR carries out demonstrations to highlight governments' inaction on climate change. Since 2018, Extinction Rebellion has taken a variety of actions in Europe, the US, and elsewhere in the world, to urge political and economic forces to take action amid the climate crisis. Although, their non-violent disobedience protests are an effort to generate attention around environmental issues, XR activists have become known for civil disobedience and disruptive tactics.

Extinction Rebellion is a loosely networked, decentralised, grassroots movement, with largely autonomous local groups – which often collaborate on actions – forming the bulk of the movement's organisational capacity. A local group is generally based around a specific geographical locality such as a suburb, city or in some cases a larger region. The movement also organises around affinity groups.

Anyone who takes action in pursuit of "XR's three goals and adheres to its ten principles, which includes non-violence, can claim to do it in the name of XR."

== UK ==
=== 2018 ===
On 17 October 2018, activists from Extinction Rebellion held a sit-in at the UK headquarters of Greenpeace, "to encourage their members to participate in mass civil disobedience as the only remaining alternative to avert the worst of the catastrophe" and join in future activities of Extinction Rebellion.

==== 'Declaration of Rebellion' ====
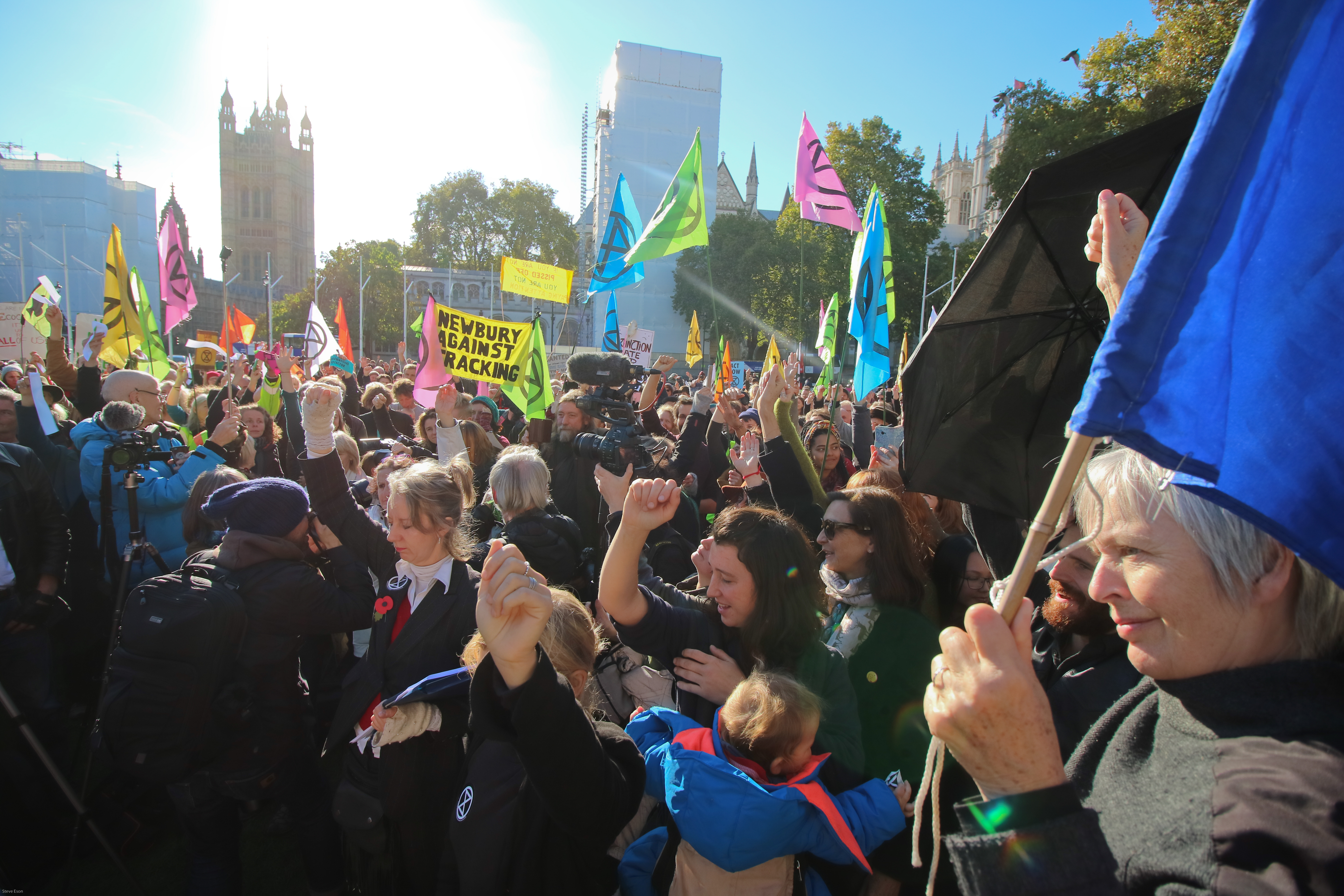
"Declaration of Rebellion" at the Parliament Square, 31 October 2018

An assembly took place at Parliament Square, London on 31 October 2018, and drew more than a thousand people to hear the "Declaration of Rebellion" against the UK government and speeches by Donnachadh McCarthy, 15-year-old Greta Thunberg, the Swedish schoolgirl "on strike" from school over her own government's climate inaction, Julia Bradbury, and Green MEP Molly Scott Cato in the square. After a motion was proposed and agreed, the assembly moved to occupy the road, where Green MP Caroline Lucas, environmentalist George Monbiot, and other speakers and singers, including Seize the Day, continued from the reclaimed street directly in front of the Houses of Parliament. (Note: "XR Declaration" from 1hr 39m 15s; see "XR Declaration" in the External links section.) Following this, 15 campaigners were arrested for deliberately continuing the sit-in in the roadway.

In the first two weeks of the movement in November 2018, more than 60 people were arrested for taking part in acts of civil disobedience organised by Extinction Rebellion. On 12 November 2018, activists blockaded the UK's Department for Business, Energy and Industrial Strategy and some glued their hands to the department's doors. Activists unveiled a "Climate Change... We're Fucked" banner over Westminster Bridge and glued themselves to the gates of Downing Street, near the prime minister's official residence, on 14 November. In the evening of 15 November a large group closed the access road to Trafalgar Square outside the Brazilian Embassy in a joint action with Brazilian Women against Fascism UK.

==== 'Rebellion Day' ====
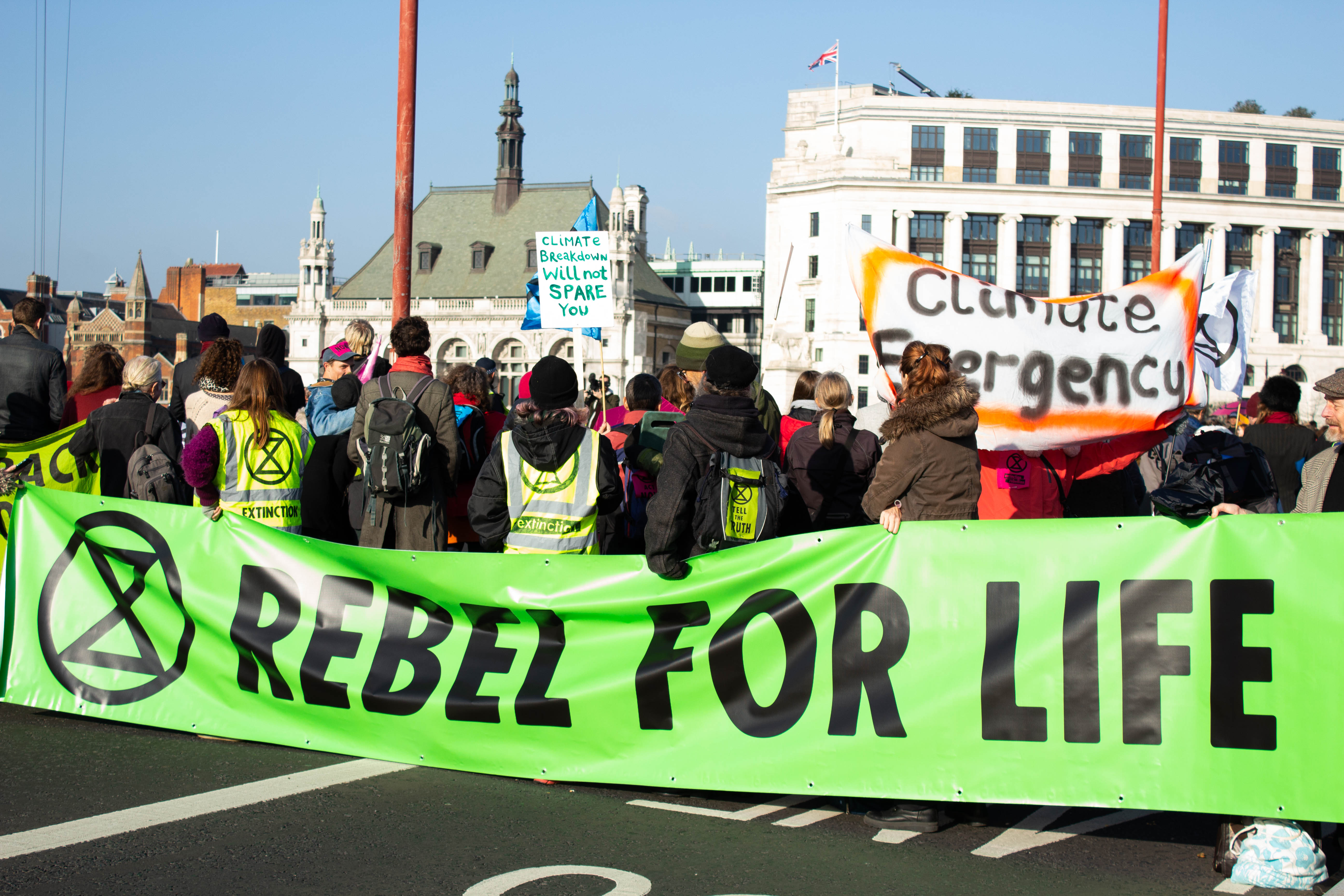
"Rebellion Day" on Blackfriars Bridge, 17 November 2018

On 17 November 2018, in what was called "Rebellion Day", about 6,000 people took part in a coordinated action to block the five main bridges over the River Thames in London (Southwark, Blackfriars, Waterloo, Westminster, and Lambeth) for several hours, causing major traffic disruption; 70 arrests were made. The Guardian described it as "one of the biggest acts of peaceful civil disobedience in the UK in decades". YBA artist Gavin Turk was one of the activists arrested for obstructing the public highway. Elsewhere in the UK there was a rally in Belfast.

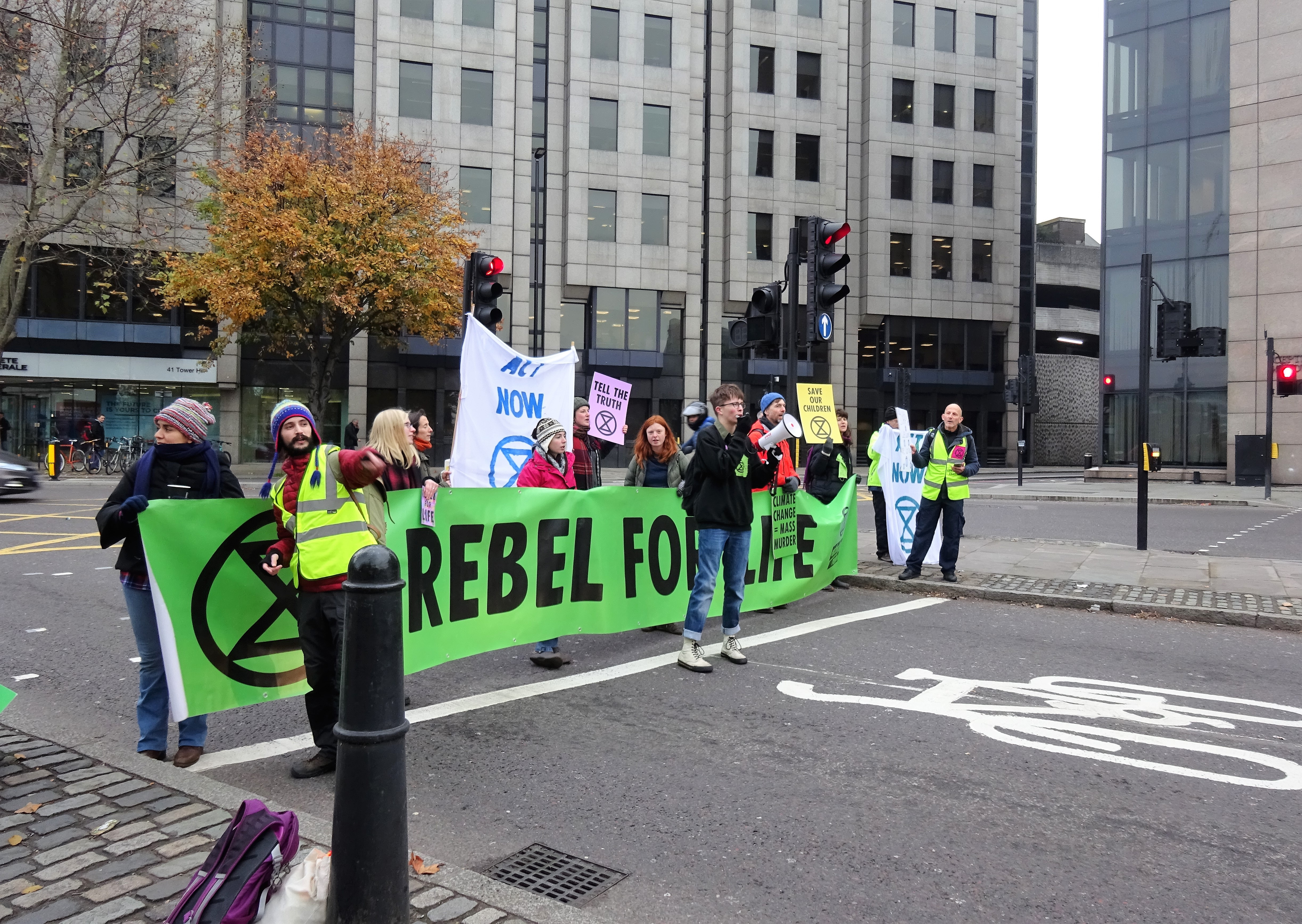
Extinction Rebellion protesters in Tower Hill, 23 November 2018

From 21 November 2018, beginning a campaign known as 'swarming' roadblocks (repeated roadblocks of approximately 7 minutes each), small groups of Extinction Rebellion activists carried out protests by occupying road junctions at Lambeth and Vauxhall Bridges, Elephant and Castle, Tower Bridge and Earl's Court, causing serious disruption to rush-hour traffic and continuing throughout the day. Similar actions continued for the next two days in London, with one group moving to Oxford Street on the afternoon of the discount shopping day Black Friday.

On 23 November, in a first action outside London, an Extinction Rebellion group in York stopped traffic on Coppergate, Clifford Street, Pavement and Ouse Bridge, as well as holding a demo outside West Offices of the City of York Council. An Oxford XR group blocked traffic on Botley Road on the same day.

==== 'Rebellion Day 2' ====
On "Rebellion Day 2", a week after the first, Extinction Rebellion blocked the roads around Parliament Square, before a mock funeral march to Downing Street and then onto Buckingham Palace. XR co-founder Gail Bradbrook read out a letter to the Queen, and one activist glued herself to the gates of the Palace, before the procession returned to Parliament Square. On 24 November there were actions outside London by XR groups in Manchester, Sheffield, Machynlleth and Edinburgh.

On 15 December 2018, a professor of psychology was arrested for a "climate change graffiti attack" on the Bristol Department for Environment, Food and Rural Affairs (DEFRA) building, and a "die-in" was held at a local shopping center.

On 21 December 2018, actions were staged at BBC locations across the UK by Extinction Rebellion calling for a change in editorial policy, perceiving a "failure to report" on the "climate emergency." BBC headquarters in London was placed on lockdown.

=== 2019 ===
==== January – council actions ====
On 25 January 2019, about 40 members of Extinction Rebellion staged a peaceful one-hour occupation of the Scottish Parliament's debating chamber in Holyrood, Edinburgh. Council chambers were also occupied by XR groups in Norwich on 11 February, and Gloucestershire, on 13 February, which included a mock trial of the council's "criminal negligence".

==== February – London Fashion Week ====
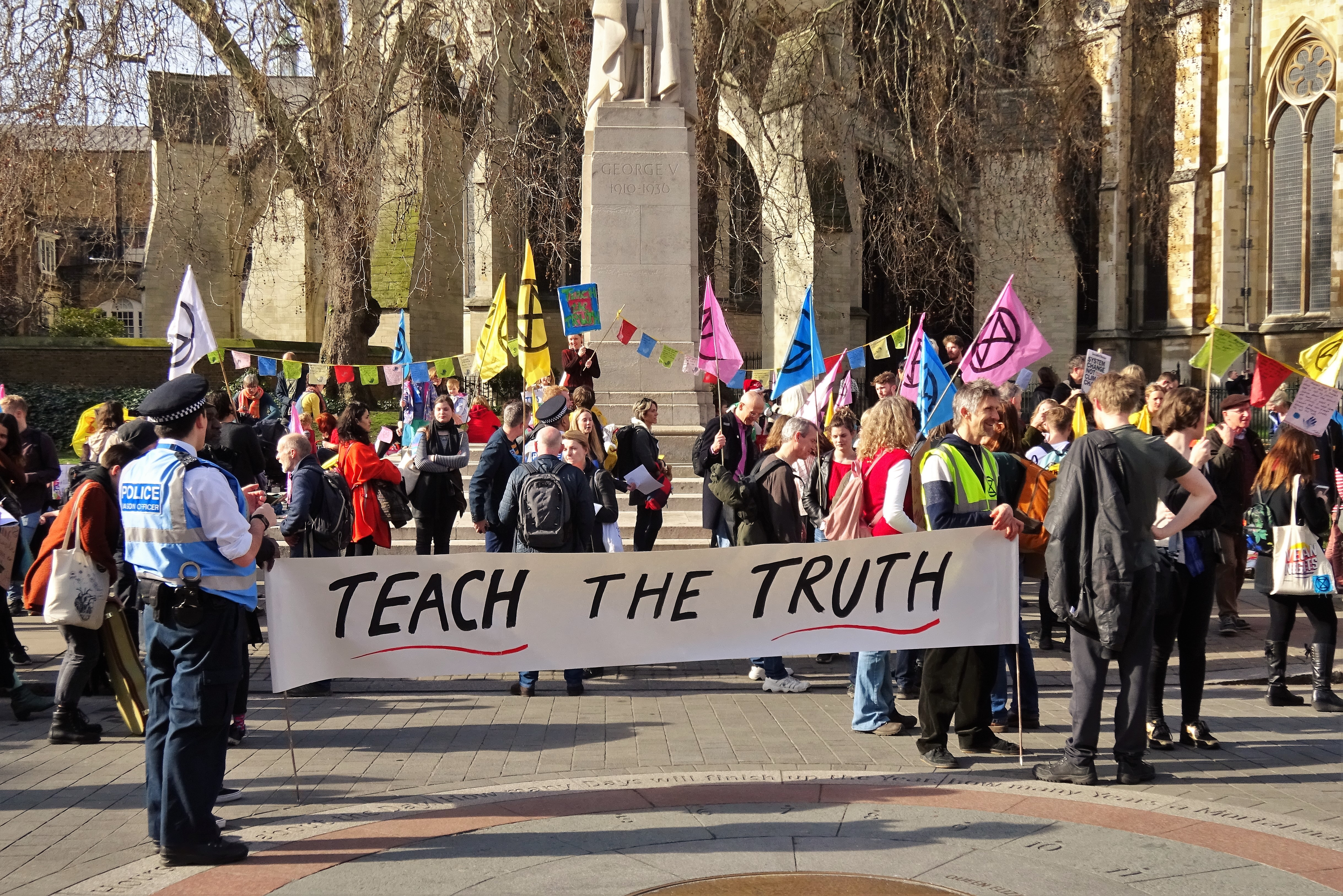
An Extinction Rebellion march during the London Fashion Week in London, 22 February 2019

During London Fashion Week in February, Extinction Rebellion organised actions to disrupt events, calling on the British Fashion Council organisers to declare a 'climate emergency' and for the industry to take a leading role in tackling climate change. 'Swarming' roadblocks were held outside several venues; a couple of rebels wore living grass coats. Later in the week, designer and XR co-founder Clare Farrell, was barred from a fashion show by a label in which she had been involved with production.

==== March ====
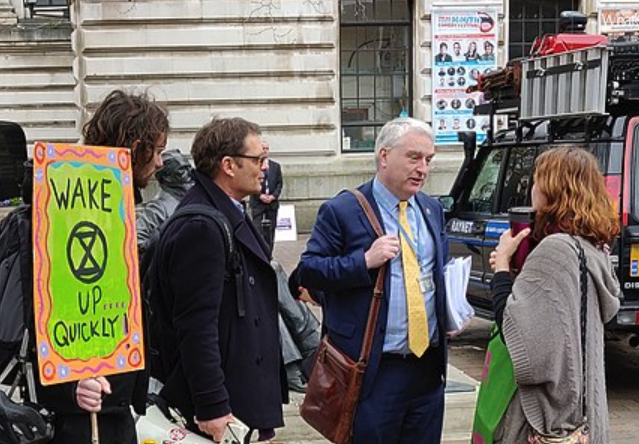
Gerald Vernon-Jackson, leader of the Portsmouth City Council, joining in an Extinction Rebellion protest in Portsmouth, 19 March 2019

On 9 March 2019, around 400 protesters staged a "Blood of Our Children" demonstration outside Downing Street, in which they poured buckets of fake blood on the road to represent the threatened lives of children. As Portsmouth City Council passed a climate emergency motion, the 49th in the UK, protesters confronted leader Gerald Vernon-Jackson outside Portsmouth Guildhall.

==== April – House of Commons naked demonstration ====
On 1 April 2019, around 12 protesters were arrested after undressing and gluing themselves to the glass in the House of Commons viewing gallery during a debate on Britain's intended departure from the European Union, with two of the protesters wearing grey body paint and elephant masks to draw attention to "the elephant in the room". XR activists attributed inspiration for the direct action to a suffragette protest in Parliament in 1909, when (non-nude) protesters chained themselves to statues.

==== April – occupations in London ====
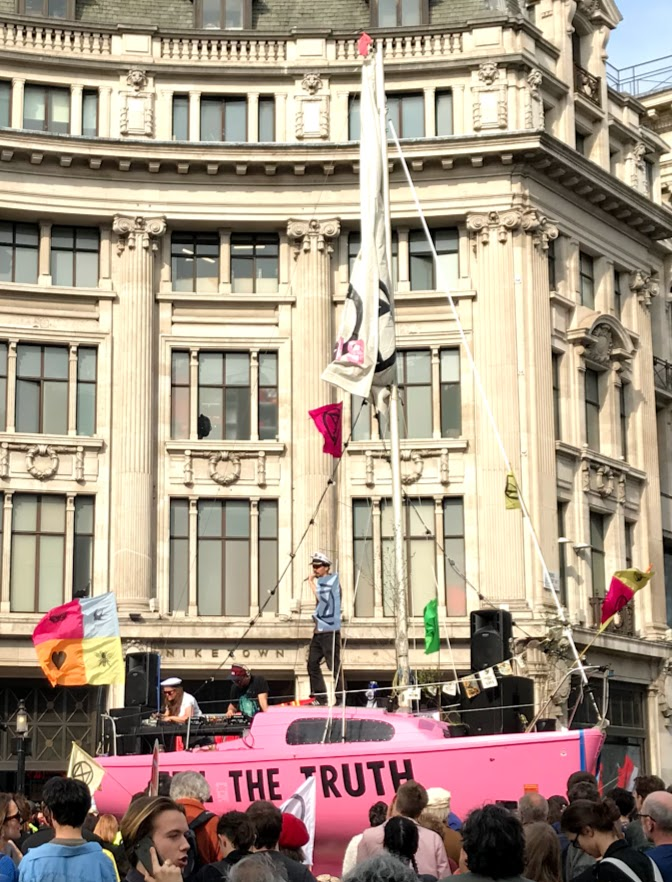
The pink boat with a slogan "tell the truth", named after Berta Caceres, was located in Oxford Circus on 18 April

Starting from Monday 15 April 2019, Extinction Rebellion organised demonstrations in London, focusing their attention on Oxford Circus, Marble Arch, Waterloo Bridge and the area around Parliament Square. Activists fixed a pink boat named after murdered Honduran environmental activist Berta Cáceres in the middle of the busy intersection of Oxford Street and Regent Street (Oxford Circus) and glued themselves to it, and also set up several gazebos, potted plants and trees, a mobile stage and a skate ramp whilst also occupying Waterloo Bridge. Five activists, including XR co-founder Simon Bramwell, were arrested for criminal damage when they targeted Shell's headquarters, near Waterloo. After the police imposed a 24-hour Section 14 condition at 18:55 requiring activists to move to Marble Arch the police tried to clear Waterloo Bridge arresting 113 people, without gaining control of the bridge.

On the second day of actions on Waterloo Bridge police began making arrests of the activists at 12.40 pm, but stopped a few hours later, after running out of holding cells. By the end of Tuesday 16 April an estimated 500,000 people had been affected by the disruptions and 290 activists had been arrested in London. In Scotland, more than 1,000 protesters occupied the North Bridge for seven hours in Edinburgh, bringing one of the main routes into the city centre to a standstill. Police said they made 29 arrests.

On the morning of Wednesday 17 April two activists climbed onto the roof of a Docklands Light Railway train at Canary Wharf station whilst another glued himself to the side, spreading disruption to railway services. The following day the three activists were charged with obstructing trains and after pleading not guilty sent to jail for four weeks, with no bail, whilst awaiting their next hearing. In response to the protests, the British Transport Police suspended access to public Wi-Fi at London Underground stations the same day. Towards the end of Wednesday a large force of police marched on the camp at Parliament Square, arresting people and partially removing roadblocks before it was retaken later the same night by protesters who arrived with a samba band and re-established the roadblocks.

At the start of Thursday 18 April, the fourth day of continuous occupations at four locations, the arrest figure had risen to 428, the majority for breaching public order laws and obstructing a highway. During the morning of 18 April about 20 XR activists spread traffic disruption wider with a series of swarming (short duration) roadblocks on Vauxhall Bridge.

A mural appeared at Marble Arch after the closing ceremony on 25 April and this was attributed to the artist Banksy. The slogan "From this moment despair ends and tactics begin" is a quotation from The Revolution of Everyday Life.

On the morning of 19 April, after significant media speculation about a threat to Heathrow Airport, around a dozen teenagers, some aged 13 and 14, approached the access road holding a banner which read “Are we the last generation?” Some of the teenagers wept and hugged each other, as they were surrounded by a far larger squad of police. In the middle of the day police moved in force to surround the pink boat as Emma Thompson read poetry from the deck, eventually removing the people who were either locked-on or glued to it. After seven hours police had moved the boat without clearing Oxford Circus. By late evening police said that 682 people had thus far been arrested in London.

On 25 April thirteen protesters blockaded the London Stock Exchange by gluing themselves across its entrances, wearing LED signs. Despite this, the operation of the market was not affected. Another 4 protesters climbed on to a Docklands Light Railway train at Canary Wharf, and held the banners, which resulted in a short delay between Bank and Monument station and Stratford/Lewisham station. 26 people were arrested. In the afternoon, the activists gathered at Hyde Park as the "closing ceremony" of the movement, which ended the 11-day demonstrations in London. A total of 1,130 people were arrested during the demonstrations. As of June 2019, one protester, Angie Zelter, has been convicted of a public order offence for taking part in the occupations.

==== July – "Summer Uprising" ====
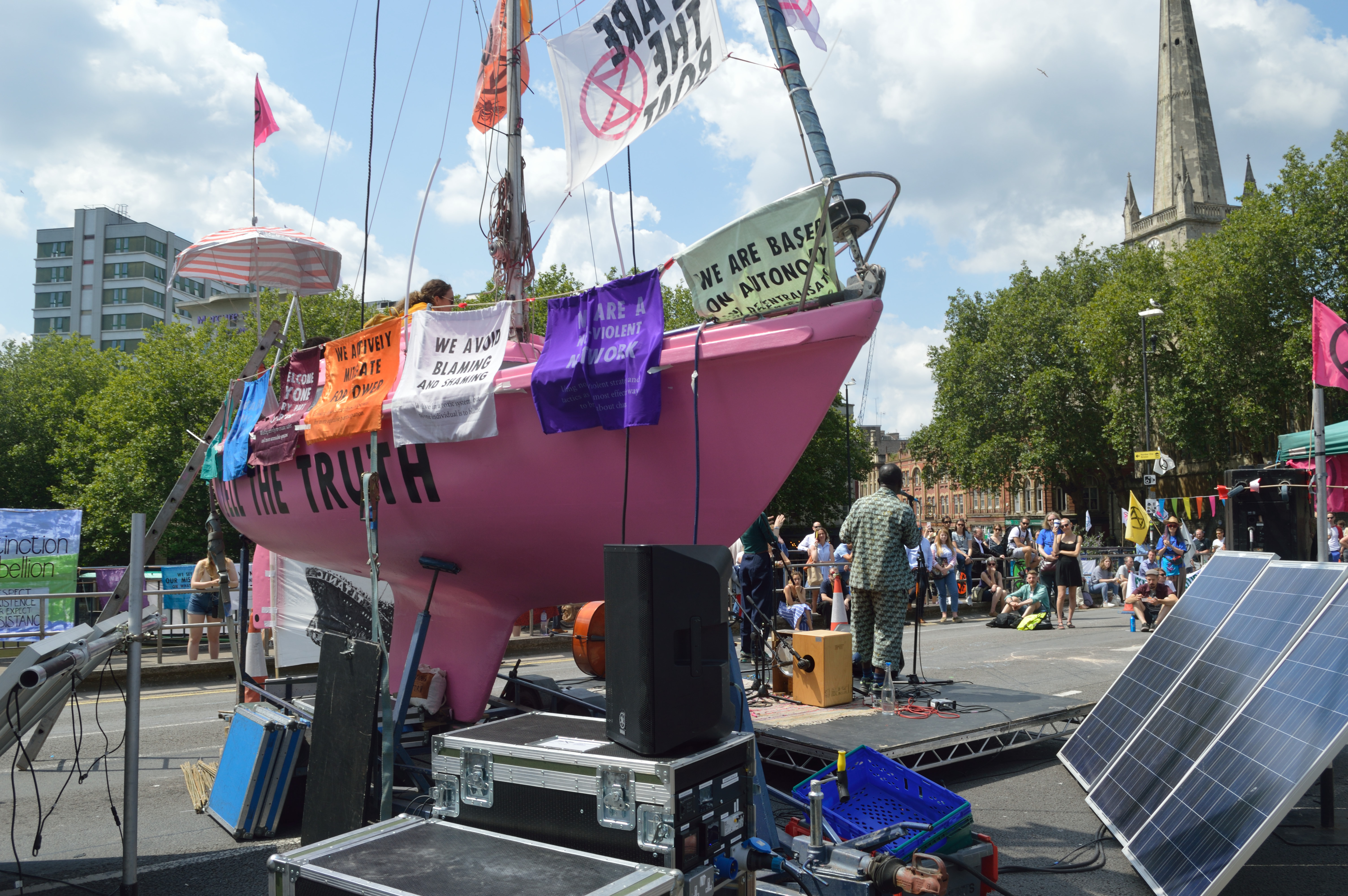
"Summer Uprising", blocking Bristol Bridge on 16 July 2019

On 13 and 14 July a weekend of protest was held in East London, with a series of seven-minute Dalston traffic blockades, a mass bike ride through the A10, Olympic park traffic blocks, a people's assembly outside Hackney Town Hall, and all-day talks and panels in London Fields. This was the predecessor to a "Summer Uprising" from 08:00 on 15 July to 11:00 on 20 July, in Bristol, Leeds, Cardiff, Glasgow and London. Protests in the different cities focused on different threats: rising sea levels, floods, wildfires, crop failures and extreme weather, with a different coloured boat marked "Act Now" and other messages in each location. There was significant disruption to traffic in protest locations.

==== September – London Fashion Week ====
Extinction Rebellion targeted London Fashion Week (LFW) in September 2019 with a number of actions in order to raise awareness about the environmental damage caused by the fashion industry—"the United Nations has said it uses more energy than the aviation and shipping industry combined". XR held a die-in outside LFW's official venue on 13 September. On 15 September it targeted Victoria Beckham's show with a swarm and protesters holding placards. On 17 September, about 200 people held a funeral march from Trafalgar Square to a H&M store and to an LFW venue on The Strand; and people gave speeches about the unsustainability of the fashion industry and fast fashion.

==== September – Port of Dover blockade ====
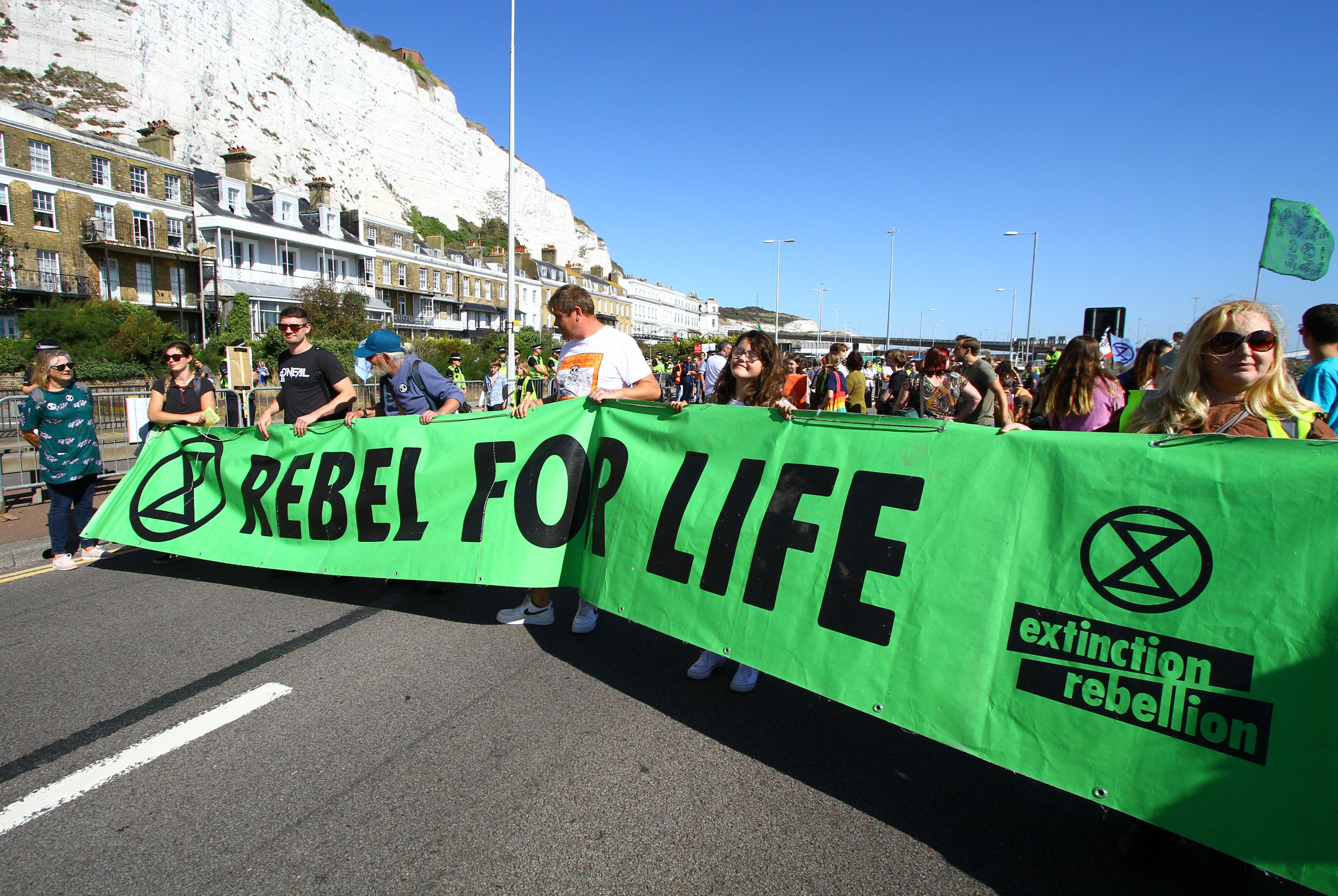
The protesters blocked the Bristol Bridge on 21 September 2019

On 21 September Extinction Rebellion Dover tried to blockade the Port of Dover by holding a legal protest on the westbound carriageway of the A20, which police had temporarily designated for that purpose. Vehicles were diverted onto the A2, but activists also superglued themselves to that road, blocking traffic in one direction. Giant banners were hung from Dover Castle and from the White Cliffs of Dover. The "No Food on a Dying Planet" action, which was concerned with the potential for food shortages resulting from climate change, was specifically held at Britain's busiest port because of the UK's "dependency" on food imports. Ten, mostly elderly people, were arrested.

==== October ====
On 3 October 2019 XR protesters used a fire engine to spray fake blood onto and around HM Treasury in central London. On 6 October XR held an 'opening ceremony' at Marble Arch attended by more than a thousand demonstrators. On 7 October, several thousand people had blocked locations across Westminster district—135 demonstrators were arrested.

Two days prior to a plan to shut down parts of central London for at least two weeks, police raided a former court building in Lambeth partially being used as a preparation area, arresting ten people and removing solar panels, toilets and other equipment. The police were criticised for the use of pre-emptive arrests who countered that Extinction Rebellion were being irresponsible in their action of attempting to overwhelm police resources and that officers were being taken away from their core responsibilities.

==== International Rebellion ====
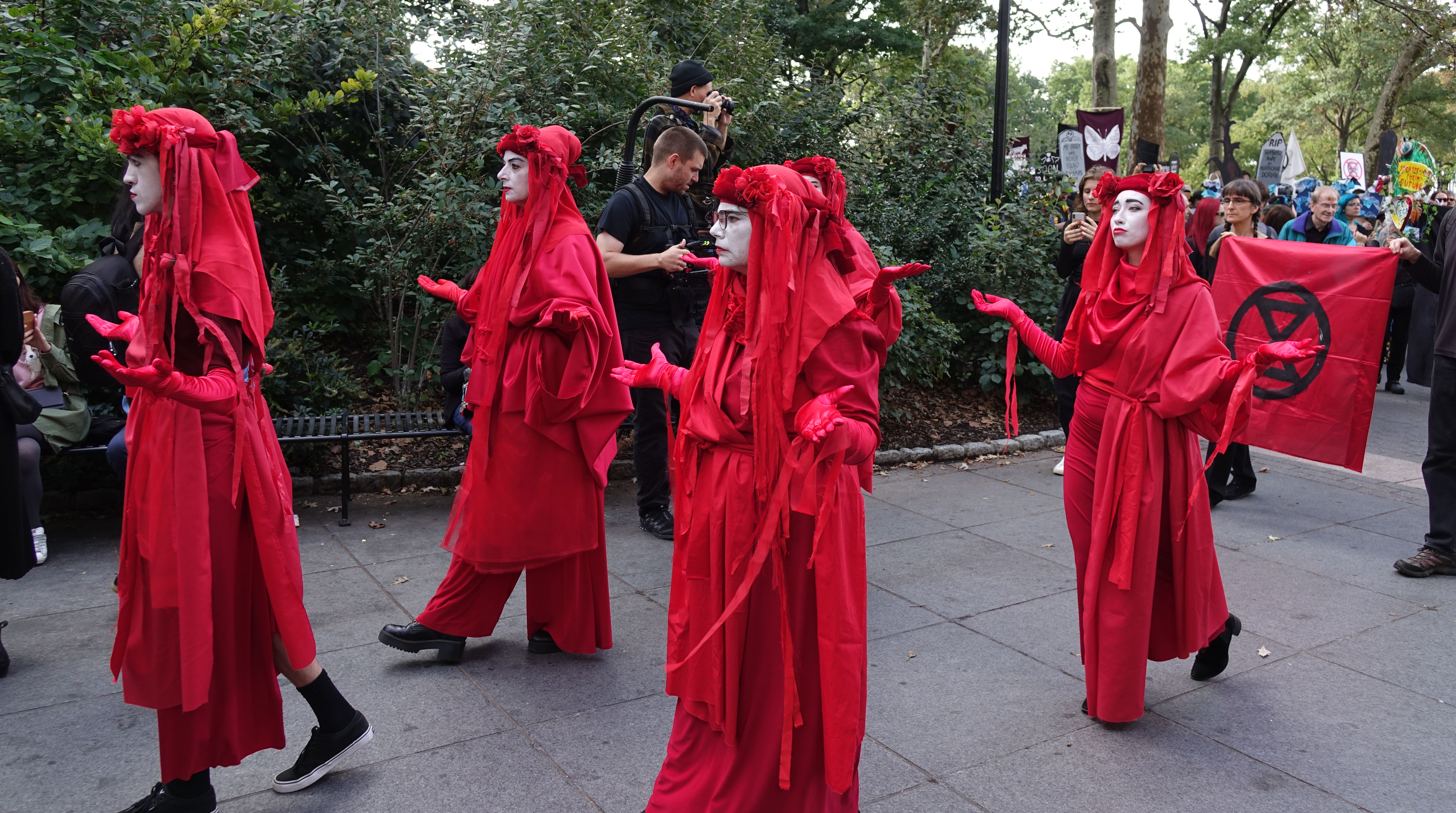
Red Rebel Brigade protesters near New York Stock Exchange

As part of a two-week series of XR actions which they called "International Rebellion", to take place in more than 60 cities worldwide, events were planned around London from 7 to 19 October to demand the UK government take urgent action to tackle the climate crisis. Despite much, and sometimes heavy, rain throughout this period, the protests went ahead. On 6 October an 'opening ceremony' at Marble Arch was attended by more than a thousand people. On 7 October, several thousand people shut down parts of Westminster in central London, blocking Whitehall, the Mall, Westminster Bridge, Lambeth Bridge, Trafalgar Square, Downing Street and Victoria Embankment.

On 10 October at London City Airport, a sit-in was held at the exit of its DLR railway station, with activists supergluing themselves to the floor. Two flights were delayed by activists who had purchased tickets. Other activists climbed onto the terminal roof while former paralympian cyclist James Brown climbed atop a British Airways aircraft, livestreaming the event online. On 11 October, XR activists obstructed access to the BBC's Broadcasting House main doors. Princess Marie-Esméralda of Belgium demonstrated with XR in London in April 2019, and was arrested, and later released, on 10 October after joining a sit-in protest at Trafalgar Square. She said "The more people from all sections of society protest, the greater the impact will be", and that, having the ear of high-ranking people, she raised climate issues whenever possible. Over 1000 arrests had been made by 11 October.

On 12 October, XR held a "funeral procession" along Oxford Street which it claimed had 20,000 participants. The same day, animal rights activists of the group Animal Rebellion (affiliated with XR) said 28 of their supporters were arrested while attempting to block access to Billingsgate Fish Market.

Beginning early on Monday 14 October, hundreds of XR activists occupied Bank junction, outside the Bank of England in the City of London, London's financial district, focussing on the financial institutions "funding environmental destruction". During one action the Earthquakes affinity group held a theatrical 'You Can't Eat Money' protest outside the headquarters of global financial company BlackRock while members glued themselves to the building's entrance. That night police, controversially, banned all the Extinction Rebellion protests from the whole of London, starting at 9 pm. Around the same time, police began clearing people and tents that remained at the camp on Trafalgar Square, cutting free and arresting people who had locked themselves in place; police had until then allowed the Square to be occupied.

XR continued with a protest at the Department for Transport at 8 am on 15 October, during which Gail Bradbrook stood on top of the building's entrance until she was arrested. Bradbrook "called on ministers to explain how their continued expansion of roads and airports fitted with a net-zero emissions target." There was much criticism of the police ban, described as "chilling and unlawful", by individuals and organisations. Mayor of London Sadiq Khan, who would normally expect to work with the police, appeared to distance himself from the ban. Green Party MP Caroline Lucas said the ban was a "huge over-reach of police power"; Liberty said it was "a grossly disproportionate move by the Met and an assault on the right to protest". XR applied for urgent judicial review of the ban.

On 16 October, mothers of infants held a sit-in outside Google's London headquarters in King's Cross, in protest at the company's funding of climate deniers. At the same building, XR Youth climbed on top of the entrance to YouTube, with a banner reading "YouTube, stop climate denial", relating to its hosting of climate change denial videos. George Monbiot and Jonathan Bartley were arrested on Whitehall.

On 17 October, XR activists targeted rail and underground services near to the Canary Wharf financial district by climbing onto or gluing themselves to trains at Shadwell, Stratford and Canning Town stations. At Canning Town, a largely working-class neighbourhood, an activist was dragged from the top of a tube train and beaten by angry commuters. XR's lack of class and race awareness, and the confused message in blockading public transport, was highlighted by many in the media. In a statement, XR apologised; elsewhere, one XR spokesman said the protest was "a huge own goal" while others in XR appreciated the significant media attention that it generated. More than 3,700 people took part in an online poll in advance of the action with 72% against it "no matter how it is done". In response, some in the affinity groups planning the action pulled out while others continued. The group's decentralised structure allows individual groups to act on their own.

On the morning of 18 October, the final day of the "International Rebellion", Oxford Circus was blocked using a pyramid structure made of wooden poles, to which some people locked themselves on to and others climbed up. Later, a protester free solo climbed halfway up Big Ben using the scaffolding currently surrounding it, and unfurled two large banners, reading: "No pride on a dead planet" and "Citizens Assembly".

On 20 October, a protest performance piece was made in the National Portrait Gallery against its sponsorship by BP, who XR claims is "funding extinction". Three protesters lay on the gallery floor wearing only underwear while others poured fake oil over them; a monologue was given and information handed out. The protest was on the final day of the BP Portrait Award exhibition and in a room in which pieces sponsored by BP were on display.

==== Hunger strike ====
Some XR activists took part in a global hunger strike that began on 18 November, involving 526 people in 28 countries, 263 of whom were in the UK. The hunger strike was "intended to show how the climate crisis is already urgently affecting people in many parts of the world." Although most ended their strike around 23/24 November, by 27 November a handful from Extinction Rebellion continued, stationed outside Labour, Conservative and Liberal Democrat party headquarters in London. Their request was for all political party leaders to agree to meet them and pledge support for XR's Climate and Ecological Emergency Bill.

==== "Election Rebellion: Twelve Days Of Crisis" ====
On 4 December about half a dozen activists dressed in yellow-and-black bee outfits held an action during Liberal Democrats' campaigning for the 2019 UK general election in Streatham, south London. One such activist glued himself to the windscreen of the Liberal Democrats' battle bus.

On 9 December activists blockaded a central London road to demand the next government tackles air pollution in London. They wore gas masks and glued their hands to breeze blocks in the middle of Cranbourn Street, outside Leicester Square tube station. Activists also blockaded Great Ancoats Street in Manchester, a major route for commuters, during rush hour with a wooden construction and banners.

=== 2020 ===
==== February 2020 ====
On 17 February, Extinction Rebellion members of the University of Cambridge assembled to dig up a patch of lawn outside of Trinity College, as a protest against the college continuing to invest its endowments in oil and gas companies. The mud dug up was later taken to a local branch of Barclays Bank.

==== September 2020 ====
On 1 September 2020, Extinction Rebellion began 10 days of action called Autumn Rebellion, with activities in Cardiff, Manchester and London. Protesters successfully blocked Parliament Square on the first day and demanded that Parliament support the Climate and Ecological Emergency Bill, a private member's bill tabled by Caroline Lucas.

On 2 September, activists in Cardiff held a socially distanced beach party outside the Welsh Parliament, to highlight the impact of rising sea levels. Others glued themselves to the BBC Wales building.

On 5 September 2020, XR blocked access to several printing presses owned by Rupert Murdoch's News Corp, disrupting the distribution of the company's newspapers The Sun, The Times and The Daily Telegraph. Distribution of The Daily Mail and London Evening Standard, which are printed by News Corp, was also affected. In a statement, XR said the action was designed to disrupt and expose what it called a failure to adequately report on the climate emergency: "Our free press, society and democracy is under attack – from a failing government that lies to us consistently … Our leaders have allowed the majority of our media to be amassed in the hands of five people with powerful vested interests and deep connections to fossil fuel industries. We need a free press but we do not have it." 72 arrests were made. In a statement on Twitter, Home Secretary Priti Patel called the actions "an attack on our free press, society and democracy". After government officials considered reclassifying XR as an organised crime group, a number of public figures such as Stephen Fry and Mark Rylance criticised the government's move in an open letter, describing XR as "a group of people who hold the government to account".

Also on 5 September, Police seized the "Lightship Greta", a mock lightvessel bearing the slogan "sound the alarm, climate emergency", in Kennington, South London. It had been pushed for six days from Brighton and was headed to Stratford, East London.

The Metropolitan Police confirmed that they had made over 600 arrests over the period.

==== November 2020 ====
On 11 November, a member of Extinction Rebellion laid a poppy wreath at the Cenotaph in London reading "Act Now", referencing climate change, and displayed a banner reading "Honour their sacrifice / Climate change means war". The wreath was removed from the Cenotaph by the police.

=== 2021 ===
==== 2021 G7 Summit ====
During the 47th G7 summit in June 2021, hundreds of protesters related to the group gathered on the beaches of St Ives, Cornwall, where the summit is taking place to protest to world leaders and demand urgent action to address climate crisis. The group chose the slogan "Sound the Alarm" and used noise as way of protesting.

==== Impossible Rebellion ====
A two-week series of protests based in London began on 23 August 2021, under the name "Impossible Rebellion". Demonstrations have variously focused on banks' continued investment in fossil fuels, new road infrastructure such as HS2, the deforestation of the Amazon rainforest, treatment of animals on Crown Estate land and the fashion and fast food industry. Some days of protest have been themed around highlighting women and indigenous voices. The protests specifically aim to halt new investment in fossil fuels by the UK government, in addition to Extinction Rebellion's other goals.

==== COP26 protests ====
Extinction Rebellion members were among the protesters at the 2021 United Nations Climate Change Conference (COP26), held in Glasgow from 31 October to 12 November 2021.

==== Black Friday blockades ====
Members of Extinction Rebellion blockaded the UK distribution centers of Amazon, protesting the company's environmental impact and treatment of workers. The blockades happened on Black Friday as it was deemed one of the most profitable days for Amazon. Members chained themselves together and erected bamboo structures to disrupt deliveries from the centers across the UK.

=== 2022 ===
==== We Will Not Be Bystanders - April Rebellion 2022 ====
In April 2022, activists from Extinction Rebellion, among them two Olympic athletes, blocked key bridges across London. Protesters had been arrested after climbing oil tankers, anchoring themselves to structures, or blocking roads at oil depots.

==== House of Commons - Speakers Chair ====
On 2 September 2022, a group of around 50 activists took nonviolent direct action at the House of Commons to kick of the first phase of XRs September plans and point to the need for a Citizens' Assembly on the Climate and Ecological Emergency.

4 activists glued themselves in a chain around the Speakers Chair inside the Parliamentary Chamber, 2 activists held two large banners in the great hall that read "Citizens' Assemblies Now" and "Let The People Decide" whilst outside the building 2 activists chained themselves to the railings and one climbed the scaffolding around Big Ben with another giant banner reading "Let The People Decide - Citizens' Assemblies Now".

A speech read out in the chamber said "We are in a crisis, and what goes on in this chamber every day makes a joke out of us all. We cannot afford to carry on like this"

=== 2023 ===
Extinction Rebellion, working with other organisations such as Greenpeace, Friends of the Earth and unions staged four day of protest in central London from 20 April to 24 April.

== United States ==
=== New York ===
On 17 November 2018, in what was called "Rebellion Day", there was a rally in New York City.

On January 26, 2019, the newly formed Extinction Rebellion NYC conducted its first action, with activists forming the Extinction Symbol with their bodies on the ice at the Rockefeller Center ice skating rink. An activist climbed and hung a banner on the large gold Prometheus statue reading "Climate Change = Mass Murder, Rebel for Life, Intl Rebellion Week April 15, 2019". Nine people were arrested.

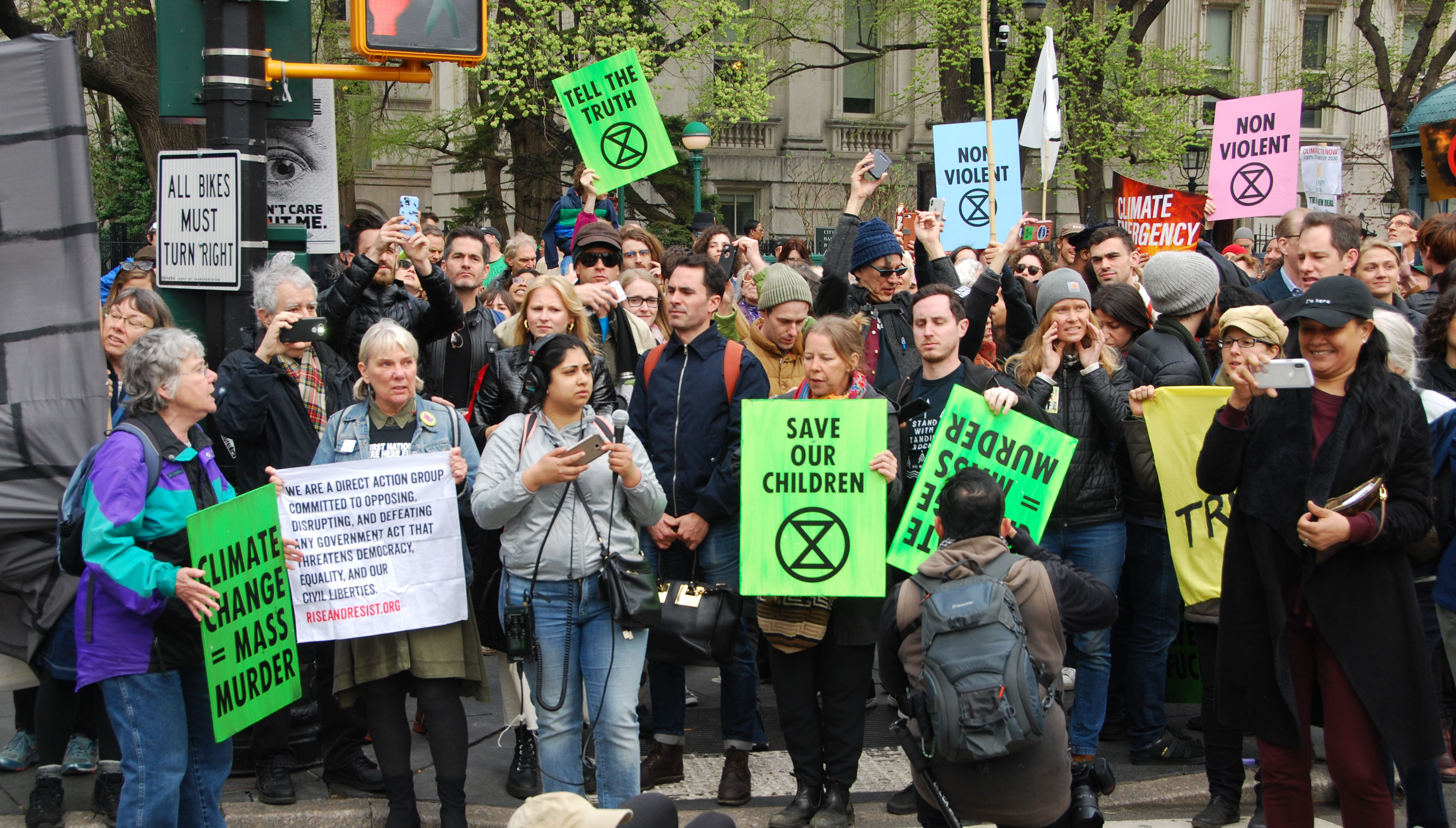
Die-in protest at New York City Hall, 17 April 2019

On April 17, 2019, over 60 activists were arrested at a die-in in the streets around New York City Hall. Two activists climbed light posts and hung a banner reading "Declare Climate Emergency" along with the Extinction Symbol. In addition to Extinction Rebellion's general demands, a specific demand of the action was that New York City formally declare a climate emergency and call for an emergency mobilization to ensure a safe climate. In this regard, the action was successful, in that on June 26, 2019, the New York City Council unanimously passed Resolution No. 0864–2019, declaring a climate emergency and calling for an emergency mobilization, becoming the first large US city to do so.

On June 22, 2019, 70 activists with Extinction Rebellion NYC were arrested for blocking traffic outside of The New York Times headquarters in midtown Manhattan. Protesters formed the Extinction Symbol with their bodies on Eighth Avenue, rappelled from the roof of the Port Authority Bus Terminal with a banner that read "Climate Emergency" and climbed on top of the large glass awning of The New York Times Building with sound equipment and signage. The protest called for more urgent climate coverage by the New York Times and other media outlets, including through adherence to the group's publicly available media standards.

Extinction Rebellion NYC continued to protest the quality of The New York Times' climate coverage through smaller actions outside the newspaper's headquarters, with particular focus on the Times' proposed sponsorship of an oil industry conference, Oil and Money 2019, scheduled for fall 2019 in London. In response, on September 3, 2019, The New York Times dropped its sponsorship of this conference, on the basis that the subject matter "gives us cause for concern."

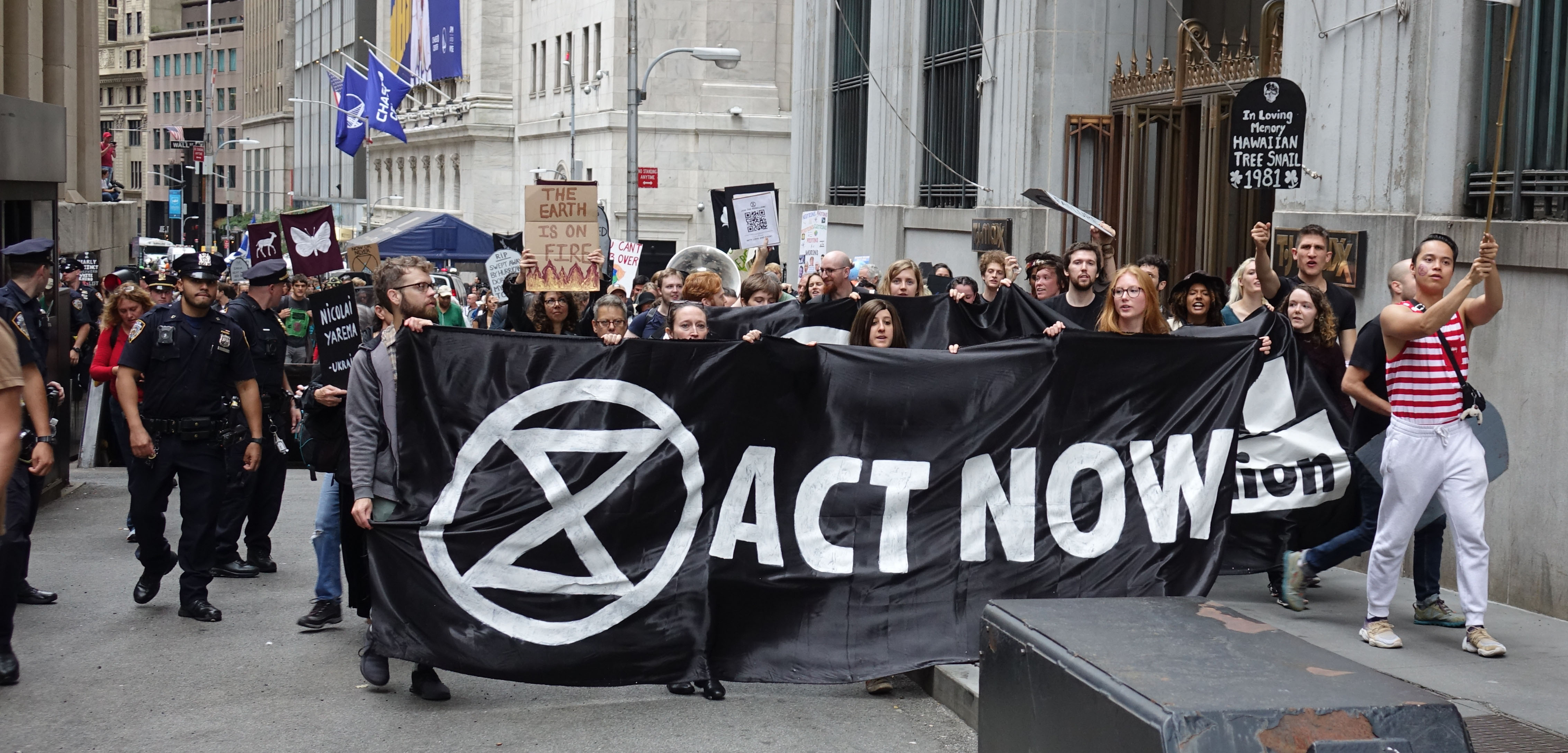
Protesters at the Wall Street, 7 October 2019

Beginning in the summer of 2019, Extinction Rebellion NYC members began a campaign of raising awareness of the climate crisis by making speeches and circulating information in subway cars.

On August 10, 2019, over 100 people were arrested at a protest demanding that RXR Realty evict the U.S. Immigration and Customs Enforcement Agency (ICE) from the Starrett–Lehigh Building due to the human rights abuses occurring at the US-Mexico border and ICE's role in mass deportations. This action, which involved protesters shutting down the West Side Highway, was co-sponsored by Extinction Rebellion NYC, Movimiento Cosecha, the NYC DSA Immigration Justice Working Group, and the Metropolitan Anarchist Coordinating Council.

On September 5, 2019, members of Extinction Rebellion blocked traffic at multiple intersections in midtown Manhattan and performed dance routines to bring attention to the ongoing fires in Amazonia.

On September 6, 2019, an activist with Extinction Rebellion became the first person in over 40 years to climb the Unisphere, a 140-foot-high (43m) stainless steel globe in Queens, New York. He hung a banner saying “ZERO CO_{2} 2025, CLIMATE JUSTICE NOW”, along with the Extinction Symbol, over South America to draw attention to the fires ravaging Amazonia.

On October 7, 2019, Extinction Rebellion activists threw fake blood over Wall Street's Charging Bull sculpture.

On 10 October 2019, XR activists dropped a sailboat in a Times Square intersection, with some protesters gluing their hands to the boat, snarling traffic in the process.

Three protesters interrupted a match between Karolina Muchova and Coco Gauff at the 2023 US Open tennis tournament for 40 minutes on September 7, 2023 by yelling "end fossil fuels," with one protester gluing their feet to the concrete floor of the stands.

On 23 June 2024, Extinction Rebellion members disrupted the Travelers Championship.

=== Massachusetts ===
Extinction Rebellion Massachusetts started in Spring 2019 and eventually split to XR Boston, XR Cape Cod, and XR Western Mass.

On September 28, 2021, seven activists were arrested after blocking the street in front of the home of Massachusetts governor Charlie Baker with a pink sailboat bearing the Extinction Rebellion flag and the slogan "CLIMATE EMERGENCY".

On June 15, 2023, eight activists were arrested after mooning the Massachusetts State Senate with the message "STOP PASSING GAS" written on their butts adorned in pink XR branded thongs. The disruption happened during a formal senate session. This action was in support of the demand of no new fossil fuels in the state of Massachusetts and called on the Senate to pass legislation in line with that demand. The action received more than 400 online articles in the US and internationally, making it the most publicized Extinction Rebellion action in the United States.

On 20 April 2024 at least 20 XR activists were arrested at Hanscom Field Airport in Bedford, Massachusetts, with police saying they had breached a security perimeter and trespassed on the tarmac. According to Extinction Rebellion Boston, the group gathered “to protest the proposed expansion of 17 new private jet hangars” at the airport. They also said they condemn “new fossil fuel infrastructure that will be in operation for decades, preventing us from achieving decarbonization and threatening us with runaway global heating and an uninhabitable Earth.” The group added protesters disrupted flights at the airport “in a peaceful, non-violent, non-destructive act of civil disobedience.”

=== California ===
On 23 September 2019 an XR protest in Los Angeles closed Sunset Boulevard for evening rush hour, with no arrests reported.

On 13 October 2023 XR activists staged a mock arrest of the Wells Fargo CEO Charles Scharf outside his bank’s Market Street office in San Francisco.

On October 23 XR activists occupied the Wells Fargo lobby in San Francisco, demanding the company stop investing in fossil fuels to reach its zero-emissions goal, stating that they have "provided $316.7 billion to the coal, oil, and gas companies since 2015." In response Wells Fargo said it "believes that climate change is one of the most urgent environmental and social issues of our time" and "are committed to reaching our goals and to supporting our clients in traditional energy, as well as the renewable energy sector, to facilitate an orderly energy transition and a sustainable future."

=== Florida ===
Two XR activists were jailed and arrested in Florida in 2021 for engaging in non-violent protests, with one being accused of "pouring black and red syrup (symbolizing oil and blood) on the steps of the Florida Capitol after hours" and walking on a highway.

=== Colorado ===
On 23 September 2019, at least 8 people were arrested during a Denver XR protest at the intersection of Speer Blvd. and Broadway for disrupting traffic to raise awareness of the group.

On 29 November 2019, on a pseudo-holiday known as "Black Friday, traffic outside the Cherry Creek Mall in Denver was brought to a standstill at the hands of protesters. Extinction Rebellion Colorado blocked traffic by positioning a sleigh in the middle of East 1st Avenue, and locking people to the sleigh by their necks. The protest was aimed at showing the correlation between consumerism and environmental impact. The protest blocked traffic for three hours, as police and firefighters worked to safely detach the protesters from the sleigh they were locked to. Instead of cutting the locks around their necks, firefighters sawed off the poles to the sleigh, freeing the protesters from their position. Four people were arrested and cited for impeding a roadway and disobedience to a lawful officer.

=== Oregon ===
On 28 April 2019, non-violent activists blocked a railroad track bringing Canadian tar sands oil to Portland, Oregon, where Zenith Energy, Ltd., a Calgary, Alberta, Canada-based multinational operates a marine export terminal. Eleven protesters were arrested for planting a garden atop the tracks. Five, including Ken Ward Jr., were tried February 2020 in the Multnomah County, Oregon courthouse, for their civil disobedience. Their jury hung on the verdict with five of the six jurors voted for acquittal but the majority were unable to convince the sixth juror to dispose of the case.

== Australia ==
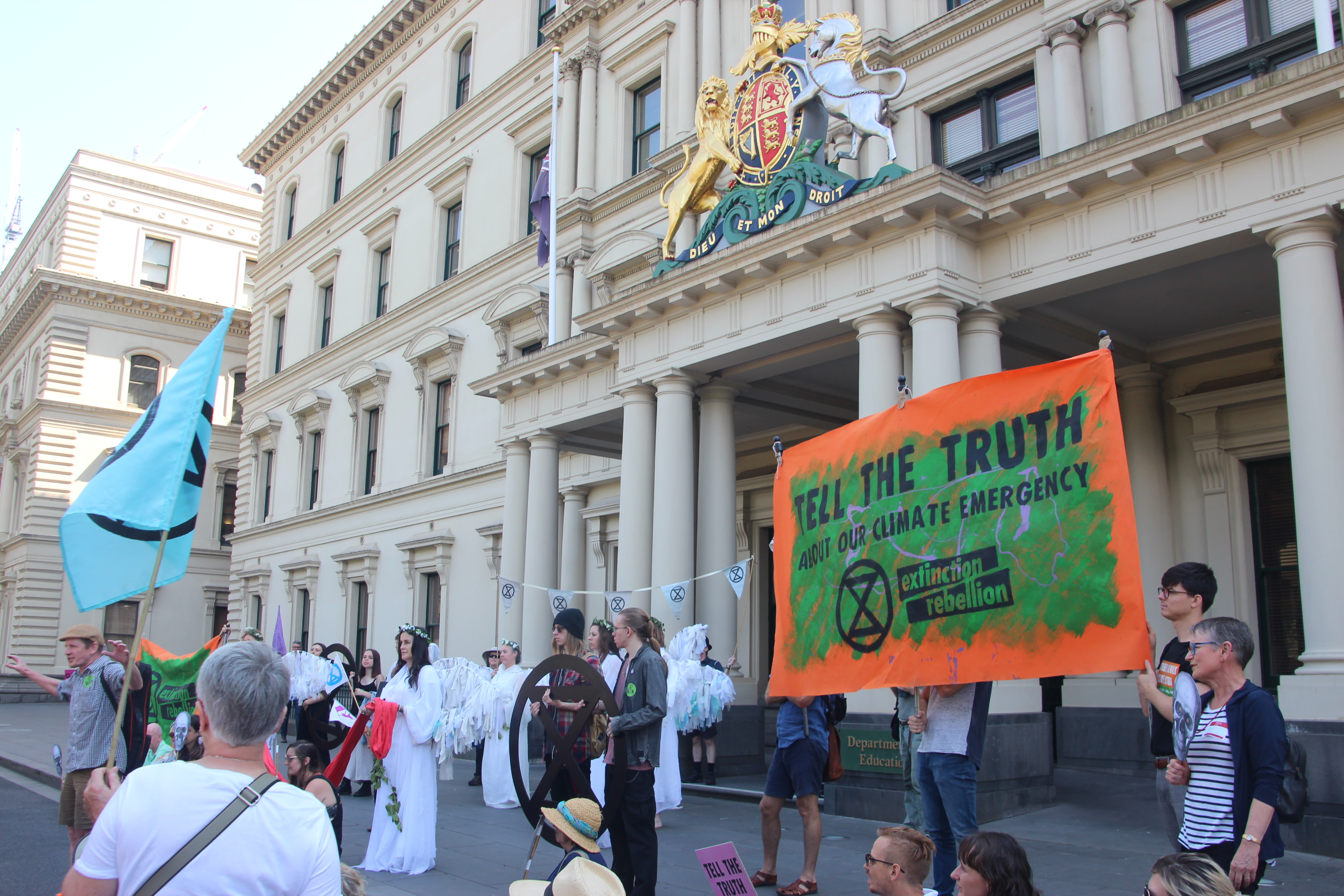
"Declaration Day" at the Victoria State Government, 22 March 2019

Extinction Rebellion Australia held a 'Declaration Day' on 22 March 2019 in Melbourne, Adelaide, Sydney, and Brisbane. Demonstrators assembled and protested to demand that governments and media declare a state of climate emergency. On the eve of international Rebellion Day, 15 April, an XR group occupied the Parliament of Australia's lower house, the House of Representatives. On 19 April XR activists disrupted a railway line in Brisbane.

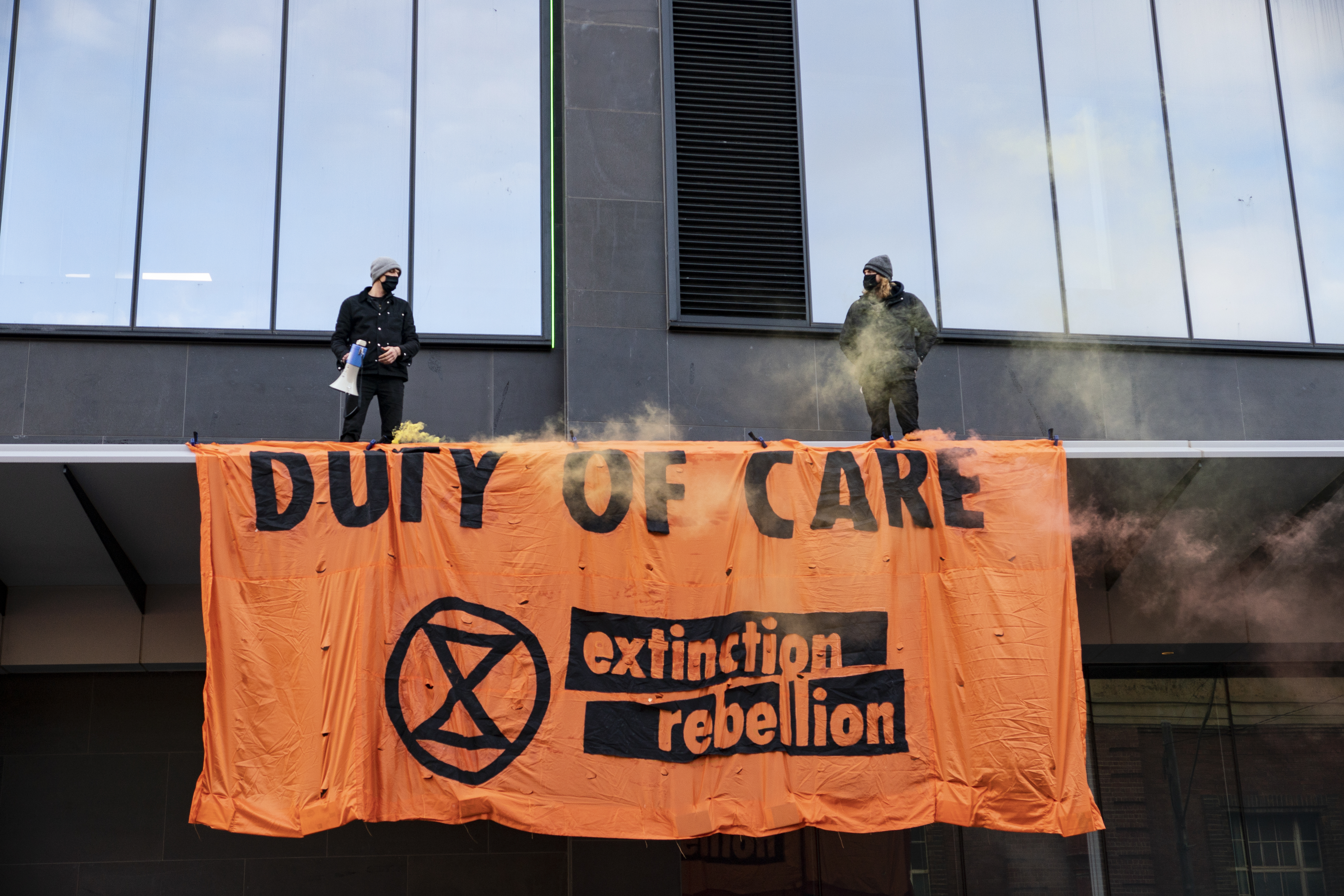
XR activists climb on the roof of the Australian Federal Treasurer's office in Melbourne as part of the Duty of Care action, 2021

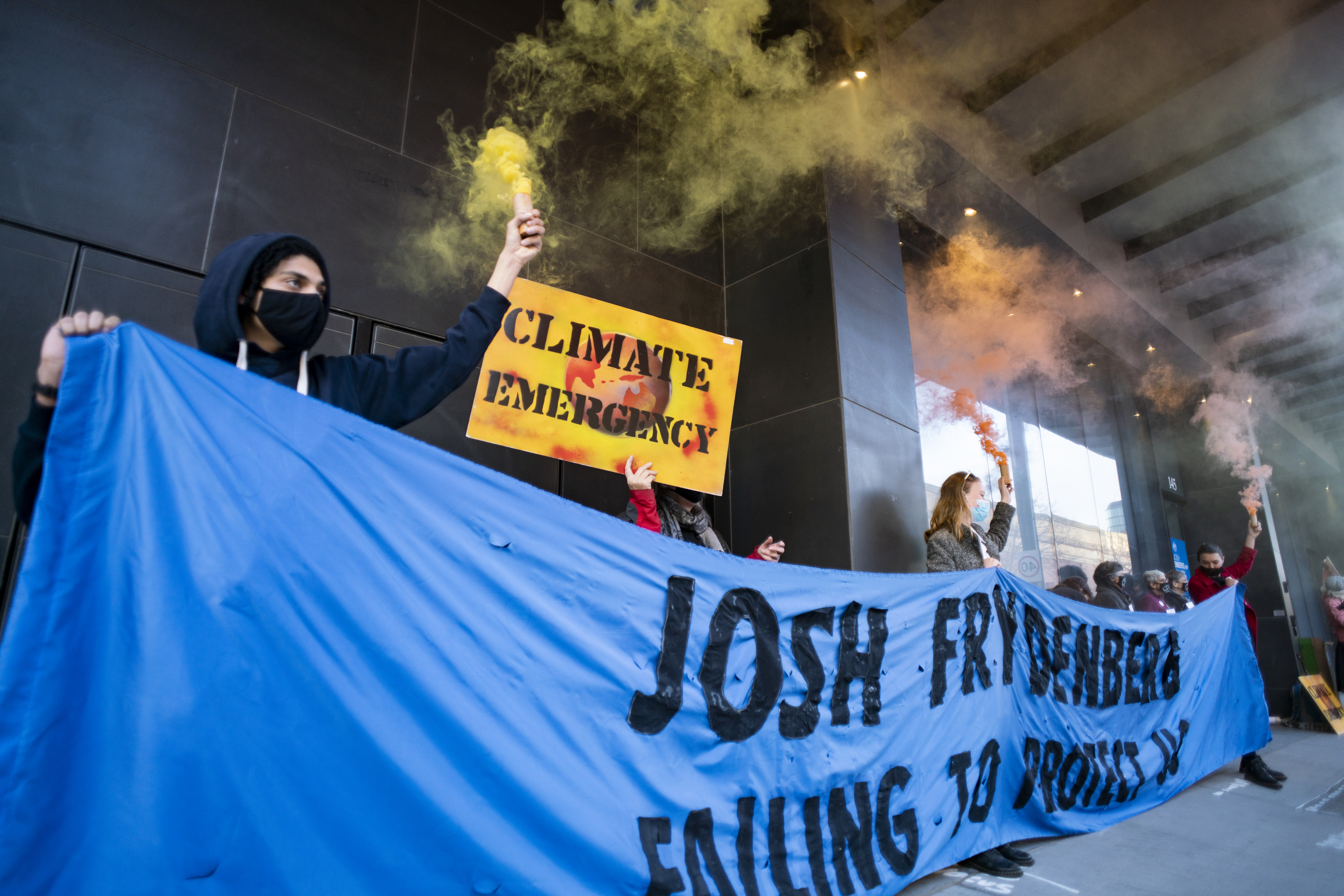
XR activists let off smoke flares at the Australian Federal Treasurer's office in Melbourne.

In Australia, from 23 March to 28 March 2021 - a week of mass disruption (autumn rebellion) was held in Melbourne, Victoria with smaller numbers compared to their earlier actions.

Other targeted campaigns in Australia include the Don't NAB Our Future campaign, which is targeting the National Australia Bank over its financial support for fossil fuel projects and has involved the targeting of several NAB branches throughout Australia with chalking as well as occupations, and the Duty of Care campaign targeting the federal government for it appealing a Federal Court ruling stating that the government has a duty of care to protect future generations from climate harm. Actions have included targeting federal government departments as well as Members of Parliament in Canberra during sitting weeks through acts of civil disobedience. An action also took place at the electorate office of Federal Treasurer Josh Frydenberg in Melbourne. Two Extinction Rebellion activists climbed onto the roof while several others glued themselves to the front entrance.

On 9 October 2022 two protesters glued their hands to Picasso's ‘Massacre in Korea’ at the National Gallery of Victoria as part of their Spring Rebellion action in the Australian state of Victoria.

On 5 March 2023 three activists from XR, including Violet CoCo, allegedly blocked traffic on Melbourne's West Gate Bridge. At the location CoCo was filmed saying: "This is a climate and ecological emergency and our actions every day impact the habitability of our planet for ourselves and for generations to come." All three were charged.

== Italy ==
In December 2023 XR activists put green dye in Venice's Grand Canal in protest of COP 28. They unfurled a banner which read: "“While the government speaks, we hang by a thread." Five activists were given a four-year ban from the city in response.

In July 2023 activists from XR defaced a statue of controversial Italian journalist Indro Montanelli in Milan.

In December 2023 Extinction Rebellion activists disrupted a Mass in Turin by Archbishop Roberto Repole. Protesters stood up one by one to read from Pope Francis’ encyclical Laudato Si and postolic exhortation Laudate Deum, which concern climate change. On their website the Italian XR group stated that they "briefly interrupted the Mass in the Duomo reading passages from the documents to bring the attention of the faithful to the words of the pontiff on the climate crisis."

On 15 June 2024 activists from XR occupied and chained themselves in the media center outside the G7 summit held in Puglia.

== Netherlands ==
On 15 April 2019, XR activists occupied part of the International Criminal Court in The Hague, forming human chains before being arrested.

Extinction Rebellion has blockaded the A12 in The Hague, Netherlands, irregularly since 6 July 2022 and daily since 9 September 2023. Other highways such as the A10 have also been regularly blockaded by XR activists.

In March 2024 XR activists protested The European Fine Art Fair (TEFAF) in Maastricht, and also held actions at the nearby airport hosting private jets.

In August 2024 a cruise ship from Disney announced it would skip Amsterdam in early September due to "problems accessing the harbor" caused by Extinction Rebellion activists.

In September 2024 activists from Extinction Rebellion chained themselves to the access gates of the Rijksmuseum in Amsterdam, forcing its closure. The activists said they would only leave if the museum cuts all ties with the ING bank.

== Actions elsewhere ==
On 17 November 2018 there was a "Rebellion Day" action by the XR group in Stockholm, as well as rallies in Dublin, Cork, Galway, Copenhagen, Berlin, and Madrid.

XR groups in Berlin, Heidelberg, Brussels, Lausanne, Madrid, and Denver formed human chains before being arrested.

On 11 September 2019, the Zürich wing of Extinction Rebellion dyed the Limmat river, the main river that flows through the centre of the Swiss city, luminous green. XR activists floated face up and motionless in the river, and floated downstream in imitation of dead bodies. The action was done to highlight the various ways global warming threatens water.

On 7 October 2019, XR held a global day of “civil disobedience” with disruptive actions causing chaos and outrage in major cities around the world. Protesters in Berlin gathered at the Victory Column near the Brandenburg Gate Monday morning. The action continued into the evening with Potsdamer Platz, which was at some point occupied by some 3,000 protesters, according to the local media. Protesters blocked roads across Australia and New Zealand, with police in Sydney arresting at least 30 people. Activists in Wellington, New Zealand, staged a "die-in" at an ANZ Bank branch, demanding that it “divest away from fossil fuels,” with some protesters gluing their hands to the windows. Others occupied the lobby of the Ministry of Business and Innovation. In Amsterdam more than 100 protesters were arrested after they erected a tent camp on the main road outside the national museum Rijksmuseum. In Paris, about 1,000 protesters backed by the yellow vests movement occupied a shopping centre. In Vienna, protesters also blocked traffic in the city.

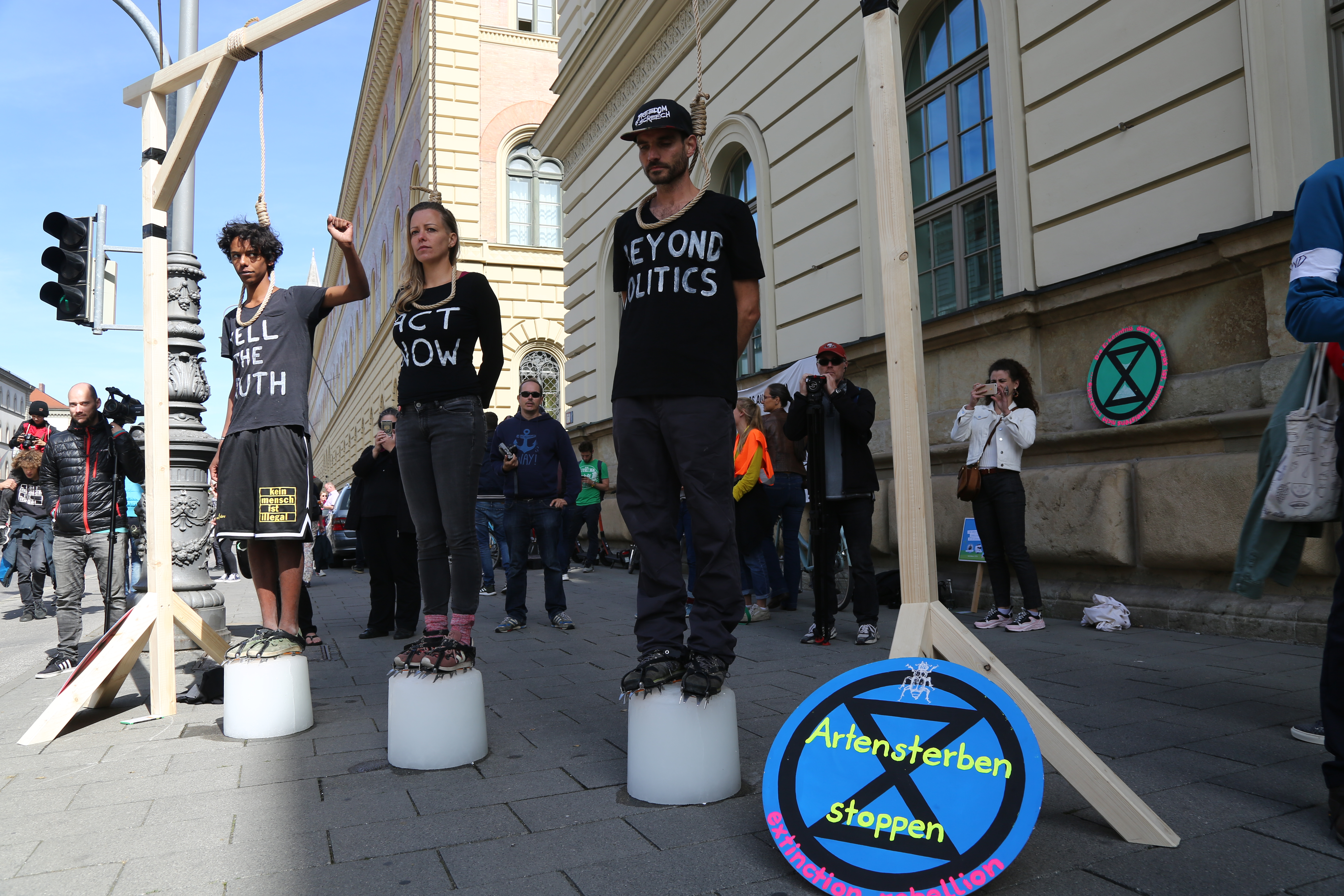
XR activists at symbolic Gallows, Munich, Germany, 2019

On 10 October 2019 five activists, one woman and four men were arrested after chaining themselves to the gates of the Irish parliament, Dáil Éireann.

On 21 October 2019 on the British island of Jersey, XR activists caused disruption during morning rush hour, blocking the road while cycling slowly into St Helier. They then staged a 'die-in' in the town centre.

On 6 December 2019, Extinction Rebellion activists blocked streets for 7 hours in Washington, D.C., calling for an end to World Bank funding of fossil fuels.

On 24 January 2020, 25 Extinction Rebellion activists chained themselves to handrails in the Kastrup airport in Denmark, in protest against plans for its future expansion. They played fake announcements for more than half an hour in the arrivals area of the airport announcing that the airport expansion needs to be cancelled immediately to reach climate neutrality by 2025.

On 4 December 2021, eight Extinction Rebellion activists chained themselves to a train and railway line in Dunedin, New Zealand to protest against the use of coal by dairy company Fonterra.

In October 2022 a group of members glued themselves to Ferrari supercar models at the 2022 Paris Auto Show.

== See also ==
- Extinction Rebellion
- Environmental activism
- Ende Gelände
- Climate movement
- Green politics
- Climate emergency declaration
- Climate justice
- School Strike for Climate
- Climate change
- Activism
- Artivism
