= Sixth Extinction (disambiguation) =

The Sixth Extinction or Holocene extinction is the ongoing extinction event of species during the present Holocene epoch.

Sixth Extinction may also refer to:

- The Sixth Extinction: An Unnatural History, a 2014 book by Elizabeth Kolbert about the Holocene extinction
- The Sixth Extinction, a 1996 book by Richard Leakey and Roger Lewin
- "The Sixth Extinction" (The X-Files), an episode of The X-Files
- "The Sixth Extinction II: Amor Fati", an episode of The X-Files
- "The Sixth Extinction", an Ayreon song from the album 01011001
- "The Sixth Extinction Crept Up Slowly, Like Sunlight Through the Shutters, as We Looked Back in Regret", a Red Sparowes song from the album At the Soundless Dawn
- The 6th Extinction, a 2014 novel by James Rollins

== See also ==
- List of extinction events
