= Extinction symbol =

Symbol to represent mass extinction

The extinction symbol with an X-shaped pictogram of an hourglass. The letter X stands for the first syllable of the word "extinction"

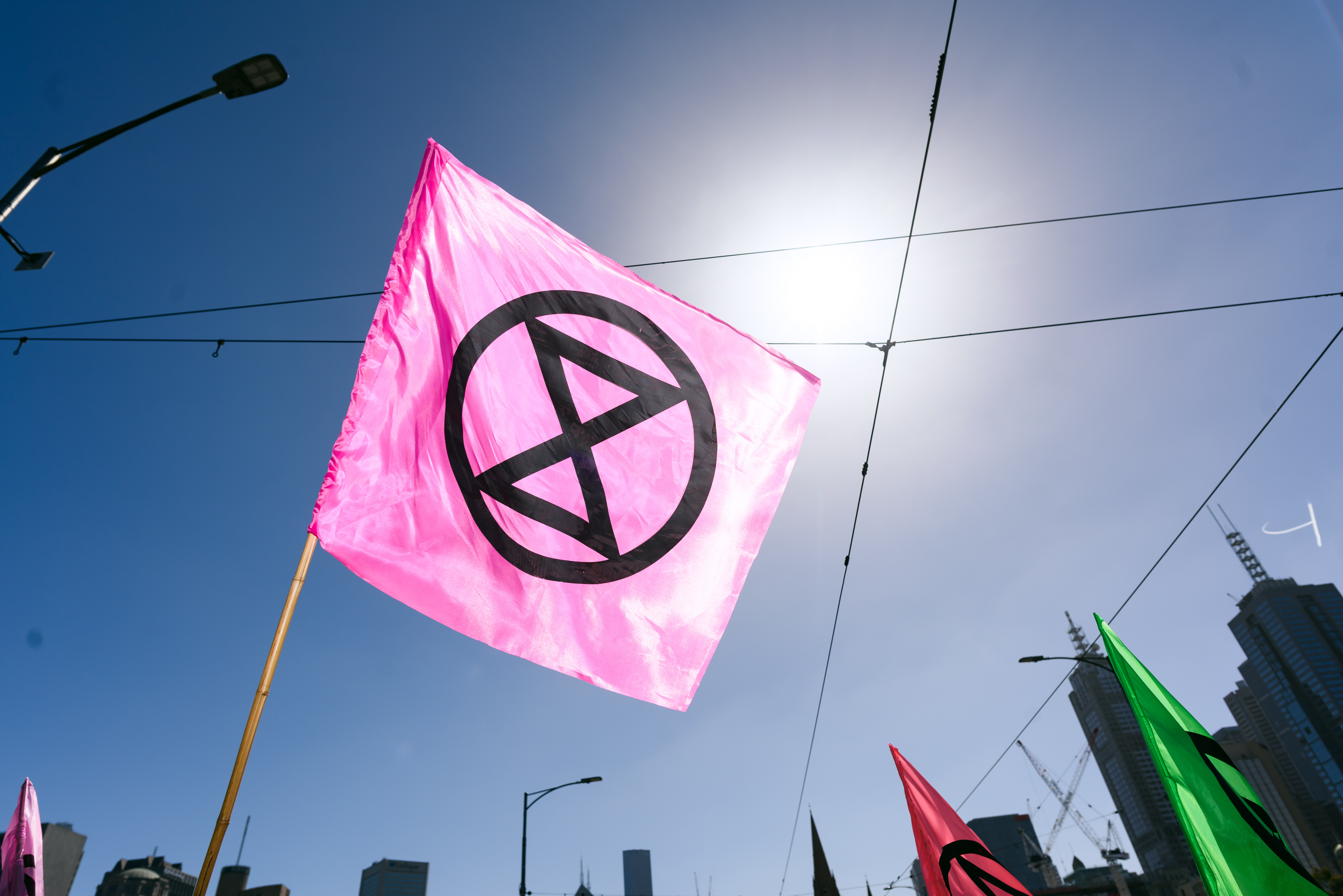
Flag with the extinction symbol

The extinction symbol represents the threat of holocene extinction on Earth; a circle represents the planet and a stylised hourglass is a warning that time is running out for many species. The symbol dates to at least 2012 and has been attributed to anonymous East London artist Goldfrog ESP. The symbol has been called "this generation's peace sign". It is used by environmental protesters, and has been incorporated in works by artists and designers such as Banksy. In 2019, the Victoria and Albert Museum acquired a digital copy of the symbol, and other artifacts featuring the symbol, for its permanent collection.

== Attribution ==
In 2019, The Guardian reported that "Where the symbol has come from is something of a mystery". The Guardian noted that the most reliable attribution is to an anonymous East London artist known only as "ESP" or "Goldfrog ESP", who declines to be contacted directly except via his Extinction Symbol website, (Note: The website is identified as being: www.extinctionsymbol.info; the Extinction Rebellion provide a link to the website on the Disclaimer section of their own website, saying: "The Extinction Symbol was designed prior to Extinction Rebellion. Using the symbol on commercial merchandise is strictly forbidden. For more information visit www.extinctionsymbol.info.") which has been supported by design media, and the wider media.

In 2019, the New Statesman, reported that after ESP created the symbol in 2011, he contacted over 20 environmental groups to promote the symbol with little success. However, in 2018, the Extinction Rebellion (XR) contacted ESP regarding adoption and use of the symbol, (Note: The Guardian and Quartz note that London graphic designer Charlie Waterhouse, was a key point of contact with ESP regarding use and licensing by XR.) and ESP clarified on his Extinction Symbol website, that the symbol is freely available to those who wish to use it for non-commercial purposes. In May 2019, Gail Bradbrook of XR issued a public statement to clarify that: "Not only does XR not support or endorse any corporations, it reminds them that the Extinction Symbol ⧖⃝ may never be used for commercial purposes, including fundraising. The Extinction Symbol is loaned in good faith to XR by UK street artist ESP".

In 2019, noted typeface blogger, Jason Kottke, remarked that the above licensing structure means that while individuals can create their own clothing and signs using the symbol, a non-profit organization could not raise funds, or even use economies of scale, to mass-produce items for sale with the symbol.

== Meaning ==
Peace sign

Circle-A sign

In 2019, in an email interview with Ecohustler, ESP said the following on its creation: "At the start of 2011, I was just randomly sketching designs and as soon as I drew the symbol, I knew what it was".

ESP said they chose the circle to represent earth, and a stylized hourglass to represent that time is running out. The similarity with Gerald Holtom's black and white circular peace sign (the CND nuclear disarmament symbol) is noted, as is its similarity with the round black and white Circle-A symbol used by Anarchists. Other commentators have highlighted the "X" to as a "go-no-further" or halt sign.

ESP said that while stylized, it was important it could be easily interpreted, saying: "I started off by chalking it really large on a wall down Brick Lane and some guys standing across the street were joking around, asking me if I thought I was Banksy or something. I just ignored them and carried on. Then they became curious about the meaning and one said "X marks the spot", then his friend said "No, time's running out". I turned around and was like "Yes!!"".

== Usage ==
=== Protest ===
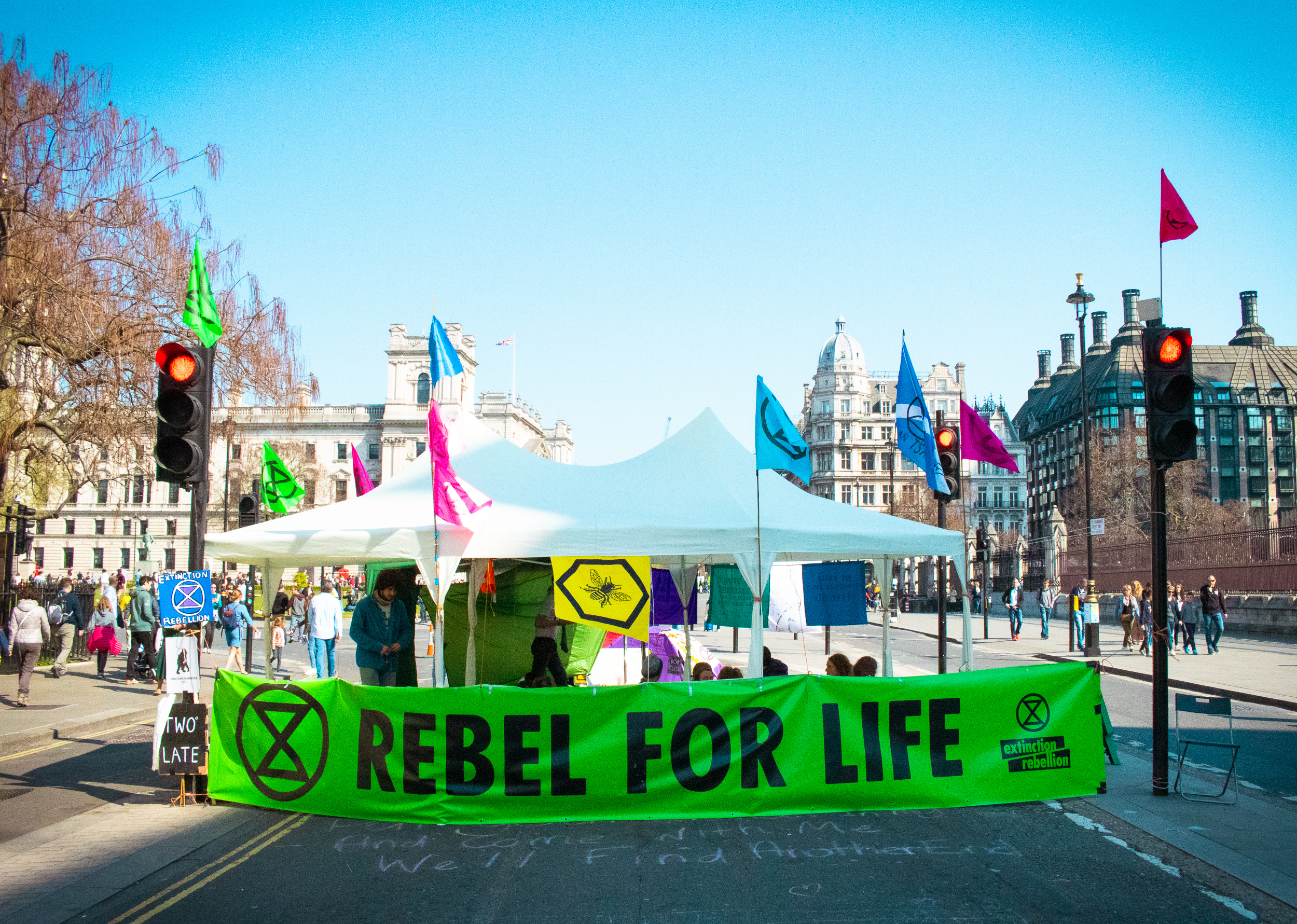
Extinction Rebellion, London (2019)

The symbol came to prominence when it came to be used by environmental action group Extinction Rebellion (XR) in protests around the world from 2018 onwards. The extinction symbol has been sprayed in removable chalk paint on government buildings during environmental protests in the United Kingdom, and at other protest venues across Europe. In April 2019, The Guardian described the symbol as "this generation's peace sign".

At the Glastonbury Festival 2019, over 2,000 festival attendees re-created a human version of the extinction symbol. In July 2019, BBC News reported on a giant extinction symbol crop circle, while the XR noted other equivalent public displays of the extinction symbol around the world. In October, a temporary extinction symbol made from T-shirts was placed on the historic Alton Barnes White Horse.

=== Art ===
From this moment despair ends and tactics begin, attrib. Banksy

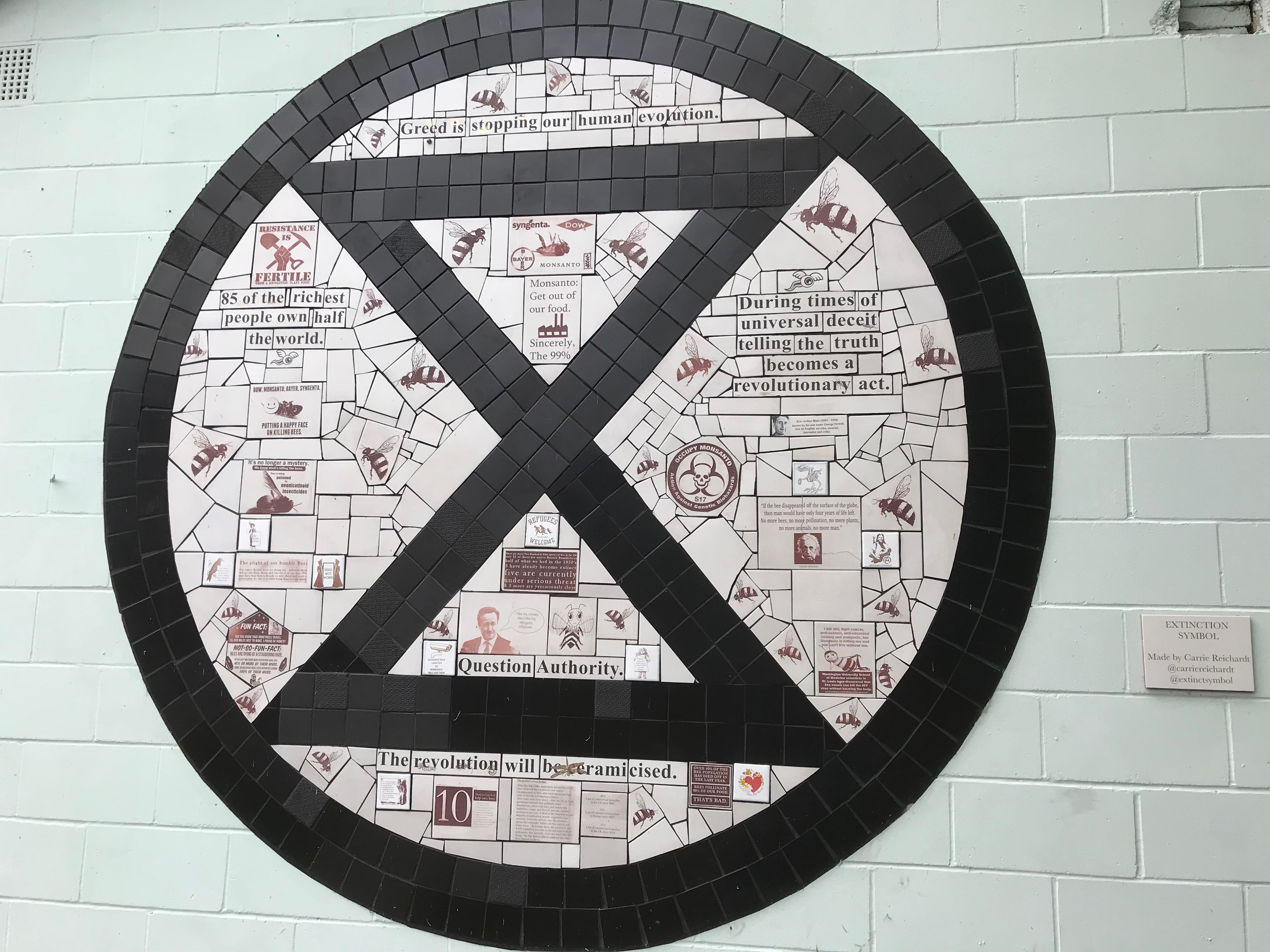
Bees, by Carrie Reichardt

Extinction Rebellion (XR) have used external and internal graphic design teams to replicate the extinction symbol in many forms using inspiration from the Situationist International movement of the 1960s.

British ceramic artist, Carrie Reichardt, featured the symbol in a 2016 piece titled Bees. Extinction Gong was an art installation by Crystelle Vu and Julian Oliver that features the symbol as a centerpiece; it was part of the 2018 Disappearing Legacies: The World as Forest exhibition in Berlin.

In April 2019, From this moment despair ends and tactics begin, a piece attributed to artist Banksy at Marble Arch in London, featured a child holding the extinction symbol.

In July 2019, the Victoria and Albert Museum acquired a number of artifacts displaying the symbol as part of its permanent collection saying: "From its adoption (with permission) of the highly recognisable extinction symbol first designed in 2011 by the London street artist ESP to its limited but “punchy” colour palette and carefully worded slogans, she said the group had used design to galvanise concern for the climate emergency".

== See also ==
- Anarchist symbolism
- Doomsday Clock
- Environmental art
- Environmental movement
- Peace symbols
- Extinction events
- List of extinction events
