= From this moment despair ends and tactics begin =

2019 Banksy mural

- Artist: Banksy
- Year: 2019
- Coordinates: 51°30′47″N 0°09′33″W

From this moment despair ends and tactics begin is a stencil mural at Marble Arch in London by the graffiti artist Banksy. It was created during Extinction Rebellion protests in London in 2019 when Marble Arch was a base for the protestors.

The slogan is a quotation from The Revolution of Everyday Life by the Situationist philosopher Raoul Vaneigem. This book was first published in 1967 as Traité de savoir-vivre à l'usage des jeunes générations and inspired many such slogans painted as graffiti by Paris students during the unrest of May 68. It then inspired British revolutionaries such as the Angry Brigade.

The accompanying picture shows a child planting a seedling and labelling it with the extinction symbol, which is the logo of Extinction Rebellion.

== See also ==
- List of works by Banksy
