= List of extinction events =

This is a list of extinction events, both mass and minor:

"Big Five" major extinction events (see graphic)

Period or supereon	Extinction	Date	Probable causes
Quaternary	Holocene extinction	c. 10,000 BC – ongoing	Humans
Quaternary	Late Pleistocene extinctions	50,000 to 13,000 years ago	Human overhunting and climate change
Neogene	Pliocene–Pleistocene boundary extinction	2 Ma	Possible causes include a supernova or the Eltanin impact
Neogene	Middle Miocene disruption	14.5 Ma	Climate change due to change of ocean circulation patterns. Milankovitch cycles may have also contributed
Paleogene	Eocene–Oligocene extinction event	33.9 Ma	Multiple causes including global cooling, polar glaciation, falling sea levels, and the Popigai impactor
Cretaceous	Cretaceous–Paleogene extinction event	66 Ma	Chicxulub impactor; the volcanism which resulted in the formation of the Deccan Traps may have contributed.
Cretaceous	Cenomanian-Turonian boundary event	94 Ma	Most likely underwater volcanism associated with the Caribbean large igneous province, which would have caused global warming and acidic oceans
Cretaceous	Aptian extinction	117 Ma	Unknown, but may be due to volcanism of the Rajmahal Traps
Jurassic	End-Jurassic (Tithonian)	145 Ma	No longer regarded as a major extinction but rather a series of lesser events due to bolide impacts, eruptions of flood basalts, climate change and disruptions to oceanic systems
Jurassic	Pliensbachian-Toarcian extinction (Toarcian turnover)	186-178 Ma	Formation of the Karoo-Ferrar Igneous Provinces
Triassic	Triassic–Jurassic extinction event	201 Ma	Volcanism from the Central Atlantic magmatic province
Triassic	Carnian Pluvial Episode	234–232 Ma	Wrangellia flood basalts, or the uplift of the Cimmerian orogeny
Triassic	Olenekian-Anisian boundary event	247 Ma	Ocean acidification
Triassic	Smithian-Spathian boundary event	249 Ma	Late eruptions of the Siberian Traps
Triassic	Griesbachian-Dienerian boundary-event	252	Late eruptions of the Siberian Traps
Permian	Permian–Triassic extinction event	252 Ma	Large igneous province (LIP) eruptions from the Siberian Traps, an impact event (the Wilkes Land Crater), an anoxic event, an ice age, or other possible causes
Permian	End-Capitanian extinction event	260 Ma	Volcanism from the Emeishan Traps, resulting in global cooling and other effects
Permian	Olson's Extinction	270 Ma	Unknown. Possibly a change in climate, but evidence for this is weak. This event may actually be a slow decline over 20 Ma.
Carboniferous	Carboniferous rainforest collapse	305 Ma	Possibilities include a series of rapid changes in climate, or volcanism of the Skagerrak-Centered Large Igneous Province
Carboniferous	Serpukhovian extinction	~325 Ma	Onset of the Late Paleozoic icehouse
Devonian	Hangenberg event	359 Ma	Anoxia, possibly related to the Famennian glaciation or volcanic activity
Devonian	Late Devonian extinction (Kellwasser event)	372 Ma	Viluy Traps, Woodleigh Impactor?
Devonian	Taghanic Event	~384 Ma	Anoxia
Devonian	Kačák Event	~388 Ma	Anoxia
Silurian	Lau event	420 Ma	Changes in sea level and chemistry?
Silurian	Mulde event	424 Ma	Global drop in sea level?
Silurian	Ireviken event	428 Ma	Deep-ocean anoxia; Milankovitch cycles?
Ordovician	Late Ordovician mass extinction	445–444 Ma	Global cooling and sea level drop, and/or global warming related to volcanism and anoxia
Cambrian	Cambrian–Ordovician extinction event	488 Ma	Kalkarindji Large Igneous Province?
Cambrian	Dresbachian extinction event	502 Ma	
Cambrian	Sinsk event (End-Botomian extinction event)	513 Ma	
Precambrian	End-Ediacaran extinction	542 Ma	Anoxic event
Precambrian	Great Oxygenation Event	2400 Ma	Rising oxygen levels in the atmosphere due to the development of photosynthesis as well as possible Snowball Earth event. (see: Huronian glaciation.)

The blue graph shows the apparent percentage (not the absolute number) of marine animal genera becoming extinct during any given time interval. It does not represent all marine species, just those that are readily fossilized. The labels of the traditional "Big Five" extinction events and the more recently recognised Capitanian mass extinction event are clickable links; see Extinction event for more details. (source and image info)
