= George Ripley (transcendentalist) =

American social reformer and Unitarian minister (1802–1880)

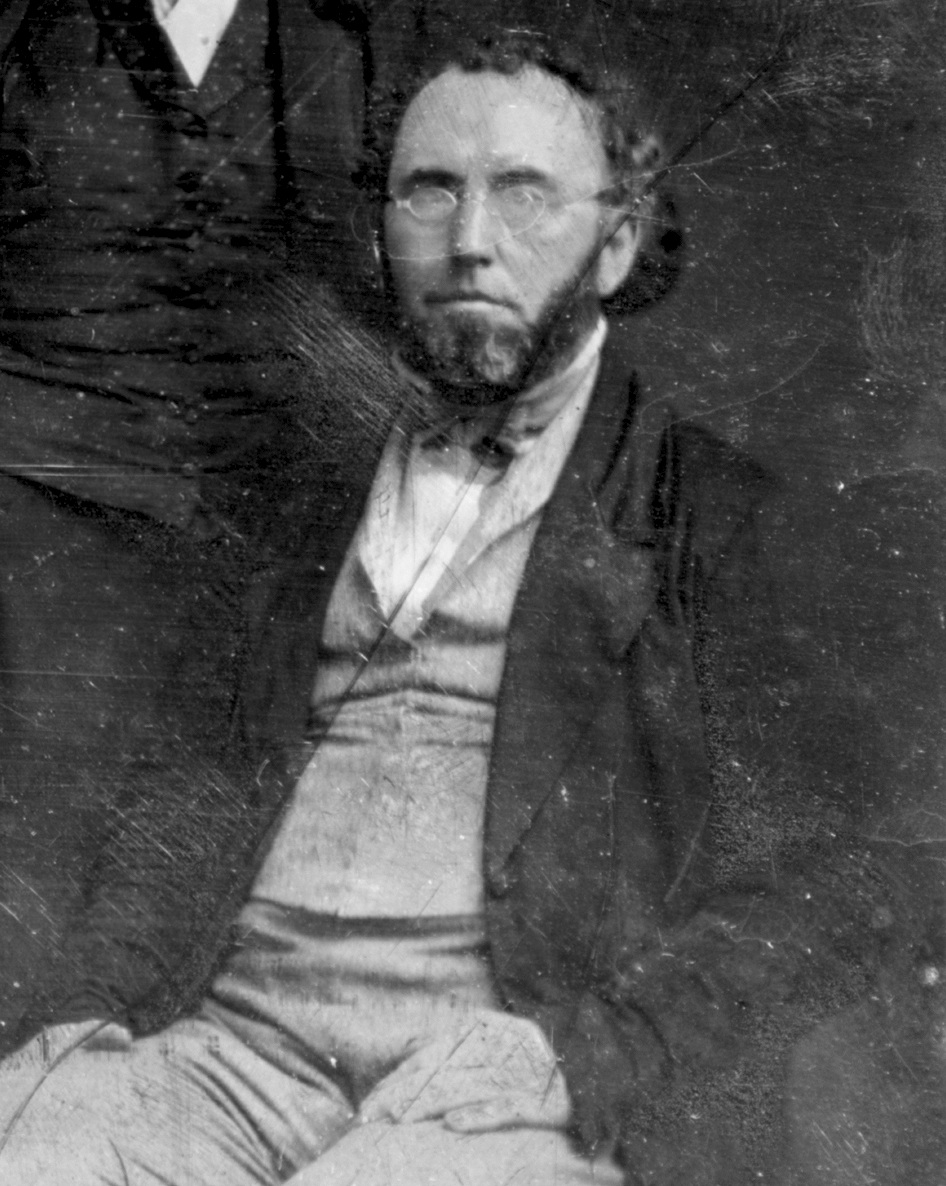
- Ripley, sometime between 1849 and 1860; detail from Mathew Brady's daguerreotype of the New York Tribune editorial staff
- Born: October 3, 1802; Greenfield, Massachusetts, U.S.
- Died: July 4, 1880 (aged 77); New York City, U.S.
- Education: Harvard College; Harvard Divinity School
- Spouses: Sophia Dana (m. 1827; died 1861); Louisa Sclossberger (m. 1865)

George Ripley (October 3, 1802 – July 4, 1880) was an American social reformer, Unitarian minister, and journalist associated with Transcendentalism. He was the founder of Brook Farm, a short-lived Utopian intentional community in West Roxbury, Massachusetts.

Born in Greenfield, Massachusetts, Ripley was pushed to attend Harvard College by his father and completed his studies in 1823. He went on graduate from the Harvard Divinity School and the next year married Sophia Dana. Shortly after, he became ordained as the minister of the Purchase Street Church in Boston, Massachusetts, where he began to question traditional Unitarian beliefs. He became one of the founding members of the Transcendental Club and hosted its first official meeting in his home. Shortly after, he resigned from the church to put Transcendental beliefs in practice by founding an experimental commune called Brook Farm. The community later converted to a model based on the work of Charles Fourier, although the community was never financially stable in either format.

After Brook Farm's failure, Ripley was hired by Horace Greeley at the New York Tribune. He also published the New American Cyclopaedia, which made him financially successful. He built a national reputation as an arbiter of taste and literature before his death in 1880.

== Biography ==
=== Early life and education ===
Ripley's ancestors had lived in Hingham, Massachusetts, for 140 years before Jerome Ripley moved his family to Greenfield, a town in the western part of the state, in 1789. He was moderately successful as the owner of a general store and tavern and was a prominent member of the community. His son George Ripley was born in Greenfield on October 3, 1802, the ninth child in the family.

George Ripley's early life was heavily influenced by women. His nearest brother was thirteen years older than he was and he was raised primarily by his conservative mother, who was distantly related to Benjamin Franklin, and his sisters. He was sent to a private academy run by a Mr. Huntington in Hadley, Massachusetts, to prepare for college. Before going to college, he spent three months in Lincoln with Ezra Ripley, a distant relative who also married the aunt of Ralph Waldo Emerson. Although Ripley wanted to attend the religiously conservative Yale University, his Unitarian father pushed him to attend Harvard College, then known as a hotbed of liberal Unitarianism. Ripley was a good and dedicated student, although he was not popular with students because of his trust of the establishment. Early in his time at Harvard, he had sided with the administration during a student-led protest against poor food, and his attempts at reconciling the two sides prompted ridicule from his peers. Ripley, seeking a socially useful role, found work as a teacher in Fitchburg during winter vacation of his senior year. He graduated in 1823.

During his time at the school, Ripley became disenchanted with his father and his home town, admitting "no particular attachment to Greenfield". He hoped to enroll at Andover but his father convinced him to stay in Cambridge to attend Harvard Divinity School. There, he was influenced by Levi Frisbie, Professor of Natural Religion, who was largely interested in moral philosophy, which he termed "the science of the principles and obligations of duty". Ripley was becoming very interested in more "liberal" religious views, what he wrote to his mother as "so simple, scriptural, and reasonable". He graduated in 1826. A year later, on August 22, 1827, he married Sophia Dana, a fact which he originally kept a secret from his parents. He asked his sister Marianne to inform them shortly after.

=== Early career ===
Ripley was ordained as a minister at Boston's Purchase Street Church on November 8, 1826, and became influential in the developing Unitarian religion. These ten years of his tenure there were quiet and uneventful, until March 1836, when Ripley published a long article titled "Schleiermacher as a Theologian" in the Christian Examiner. In it, Ripley praised Schleiermacher's attempt to create a "religion of the heart" based on intuition and personal communion with God. Later that year, he published a review of British theologian James Martineau's The Rationale of Religious Enquiry in the same publication. In the review, Ripley charged Unitarian church elders with religious intolerance because they forced the literal acceptance of miracles as a requirement for membership in their church. Andrews Norton, a leading theologian of the day, responded publicly and insisted that disbelief in miracles ultimately denied the truth of Christianity. Norton, formerly Ripley's teacher at the Divinity School, had been labeled by many as the "hard-headed Unitarian Pope", and began his public battle with Ripley in the Boston Daily Advertiser on November 5, 1836, in an open letter charging Ripley with academic and professional incompetence. Ripley contended that to insist upon the reality of miracles was to demand material proof of spiritual matters, and that faith needed no such external confirmation; but Norton and the mainstream of Unitarianism found this tantamount to heresy. This dispute laid the groundwork for the separation of a more extreme Transcendentalism from its liberal Unitarian roots. The debate between Norton and Ripley, which earned allies on both sides, continued until 1840.

=== Transcendental Club ===
Ripley met with Ralph Waldo Emerson, Frederic Henry Hedge, and George Putnam in Cambridge, Massachusetts, on September 8, 1836, to discuss the formation of a new club. Ten days later, on September 18, 1836, Ripley hosted their first official meeting at his house. The group at this first meeting of what would become known as the "Transcendental Club" included Amos Bronson Alcott, Orestes Brownson, James Freeman Clarke, and Convers Francis as well as Hedge, Emerson, and Ripley. Future members would include Henry David Thoreau, William Henry Channing, Christopher Pearse Cranch, Sylvester Judd, and Jones Very. Female members included Sophia Ripley, Margaret Fuller, and Elizabeth Peabody. The group planned its meetings for times when Hedge was visiting from Bangor, Maine, leading to the early nickname "Hedge's Club". The name Transcendental Club was given to the group by the public and not by its participants. Hedge wrote: "There was no club in the strict sense ... only occasional meetings of like-minded men and women", earning the nickname "the brotherhood of the 'Like-Minded'". Beginning in 1839, Ripley edited Specimens of Foreign Standard Literature: fourteen volumes of translations meant to demonstrate the breadth of Transcendental thoughts.

=== Separation from church ===
Amid the Panic of 1837, many began to criticize social institutions. That year, Ripley gave a sermon titled "The Temptations of the Times", suggesting that the major problem in the country was "the inordinate pursuit, the extravagant worship of wealth". Ripley had been asked by church proprietors to avoid controversial topics in his sermons. He said, "Unless a minister is expected to speak out on all subjects which are uppermost in his mind, with no fear of incurring the charge of heresy or compromising the interests of his congregation, he can never do justice to himself, to his people, or the truth which he is bound to declare". In May 1840, he offered his resignation from the Purchase Street Church but was convinced to stay. He soon decided he should leave the ministry altogether and, on October 3, 1840, he read a 7,300-word lecture, Letter Addressed to the Congregational Church in Purchase Street, expressing his dissatisfaction with Unitarianism.

Because of his experience with the Specimens translations, Ripley was chosen to be the managing editor of the Transcendental publication The Dial at its inception, working alongside its first editor Margaret Fuller. In addition to overseeing distribution, subscriptions, printing, and finances, Ripley also contributed essays and reviews. In October 1841, he resigned his post with The Dial as he prepared for an experiment in communal living. As he told Emerson, although he was happy seeing all the Transcendental thoughts in print, he could not be truly happy "without the attempt to realize them".

=== Brook Farm ===
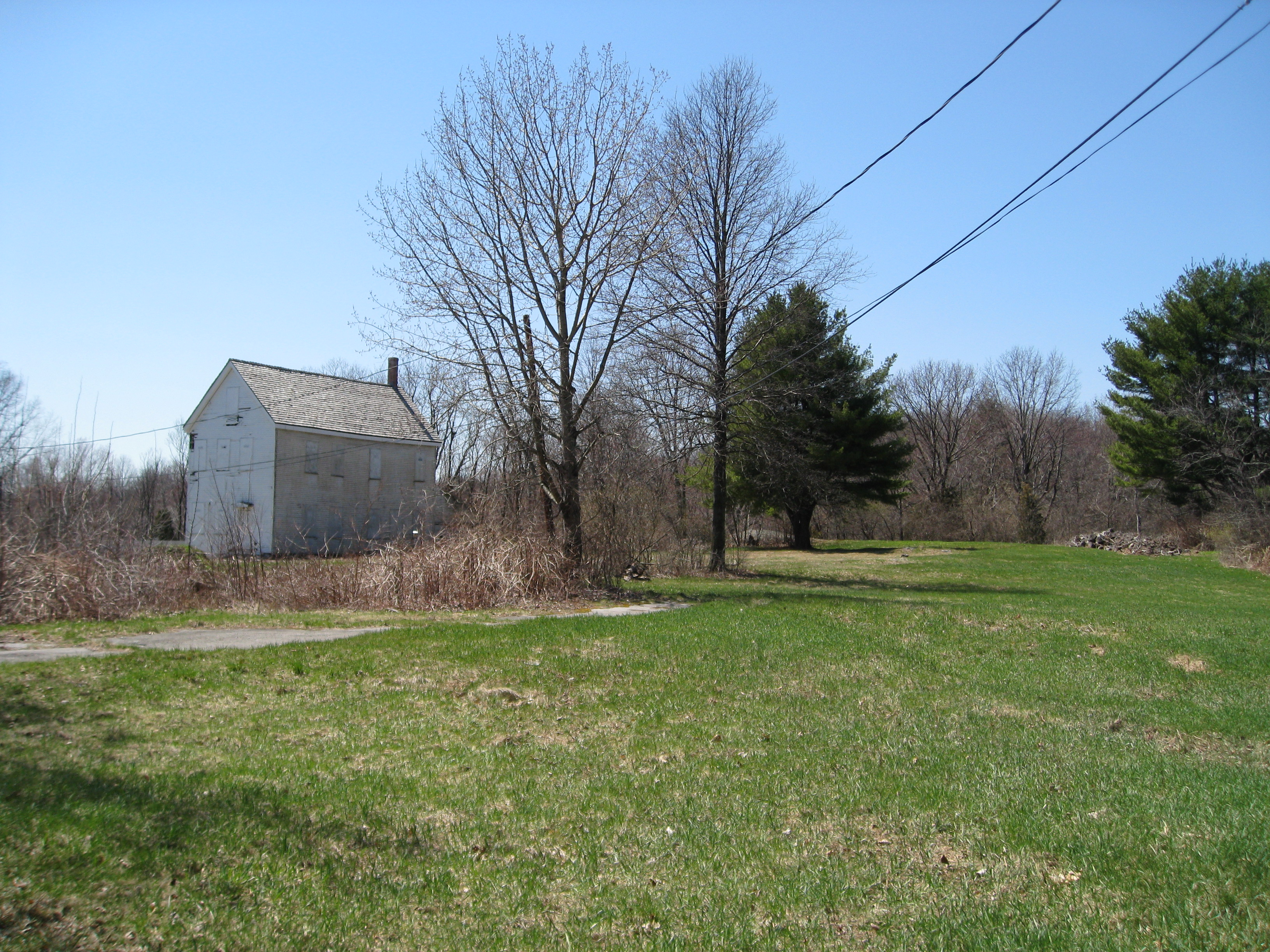
Former site of Brook Farm in West Roxbury, Massachusetts

In the late 1830s Ripley became increasingly engaged in "Associationism", an early Fourierist socialist movement. In October 1840 he announced to the Transcendental Club his plan to form an Associationist community based on Fourier's Utopian plans. His goals were lofty. As he wrote, "If wisely executed, it will be a light over this country and this age. If not the sunrise, it will be the morning star."

Ripley and his wife formed a joint stock company in 1841 along with 10 other initial investors. Shares of the company were sold for $500 apiece with a promise of five percent of the profits to each investor. The founding membership of the original community included Nathaniel Hawthorne. They chose the Ellis Farm in West Roxbury, Massachusetts, as the site of their experiment, which they named Brook Farm. Its 170 acres (0.69 km^{2}) were about eight miles (13 km) from Boston; a pamphlet described the land as a "place of great natural beauty, combining a convenient nearness to the city with a degree of retirement and freedom from unfavorable influences unusual even in the country". The land, however, turned out to be difficult to farm and the community struggled with financial difficulties as it built greenhouses and craft shops.

Brook Farm was initially based mostly on the ideals of Transcendentalism; its founders believed that by pooling labor they could sustain the community and still have time for literary and scientific pursuits. The experiment meant to serve as an example for the rest of the world, established on the principles of "industry without drudgery, and true equality without its vulgarity". Many in the community wrote of how much they enjoyed their experience. One participant, a man named John Codman, joined the community at the age of 27 in 1843. He wrote, "It was for the meanest a life above humdrum, and for the greatest something far, infinitely far beyond. They looked into the gates of life and saw beyond charming visions, and hopes springing up for all". In their free time, the members of Brook Farm enjoyed music, dancing, card games, drama, costume parties, sledding, and skating. Hawthorne, eventually elected treasurer of the community, did not enjoy his experience. He wrote to his wife-to-be Sophia Peabody, "labor is the curse of the world, and nobody can meddle with it without becoming proportionately brutified".

Many outside the community were also critical, especially in the press. The New York Observer, for example, suggested that, "The Associationists, under the pretense of a desire to promote order and morals, design to overthrow the marriage institution, and in the place of the divine law, to substitute the 'passions' as the proper regulator of the intercourse of the sexes", concluding that they were "secretly and industriously aiming to destroy the foundation of society".

In 1844, the community, perpetually struggling financially, drafted an entirely new constitution and committed to following more closely the Fourierist model. Not everyone at the community supported the transition, and many left. Many were disappointed that the new, more structured daily routine de-emphasized the carefree leisure time that had been a trademark. Ripley himself became a celebrity proponent of Fourierism and organized conventions throughout New England to discuss the community.

By May 1846, troubled by the financial difficulties at Brook Farm, Ripley had made an informal split from the community. By its closure a year later, Brook Farm had amassed a total debt of $17,445. Ripley was devastated at the failure of his experiment and told a friend, "I can now understand how a man would feel if he could attend his own funeral". His personal life was also taxed. His wife had converted to Catholicism in 1846, encouraged by Orestes Brownson, and had become doubtful of his Associationist politics; the Ripleys' relationship became strained by the 1850s.

=== Writing ===
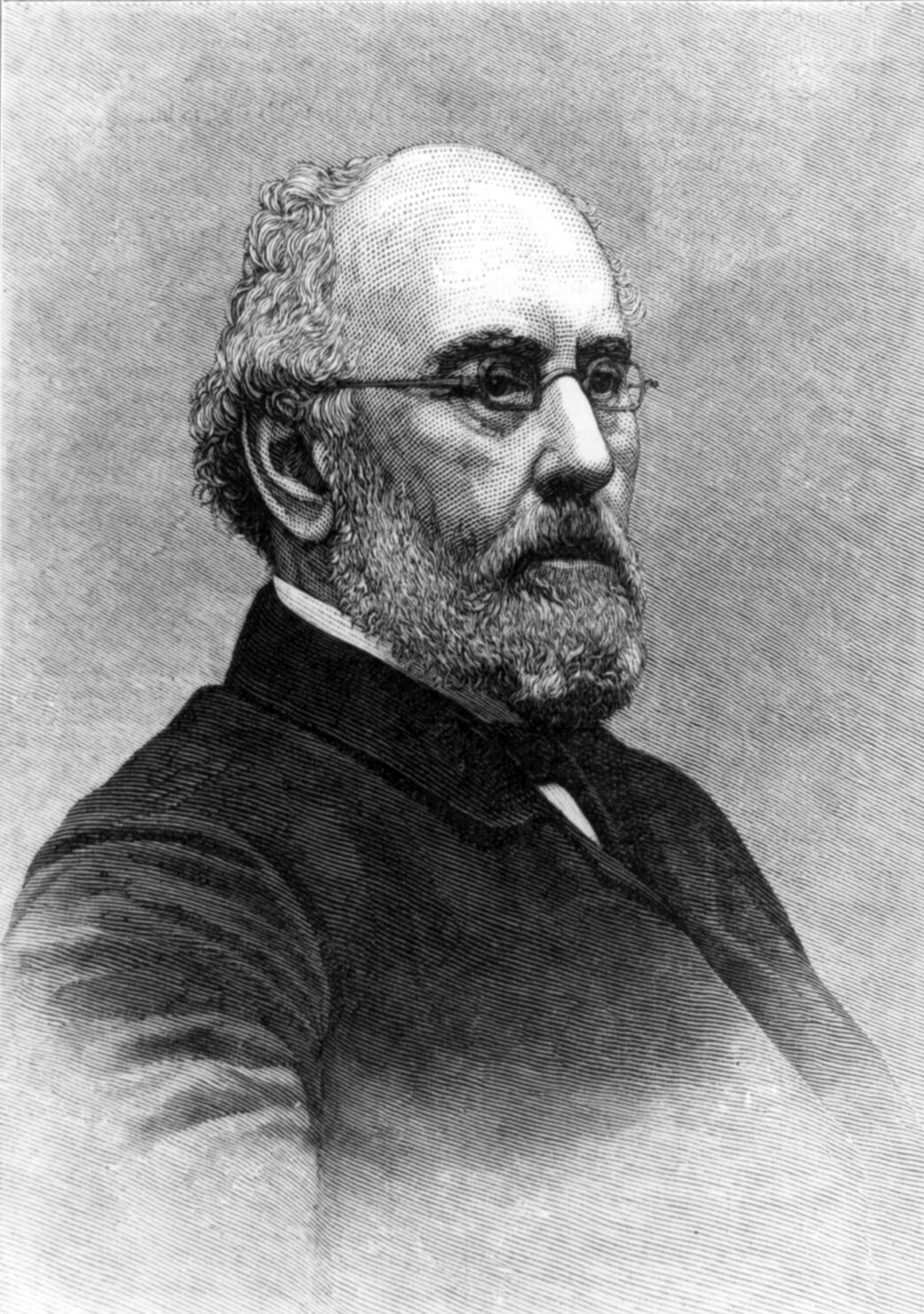
George Ripley as he appeared in his later years

After Brook Farm, George Ripley began to work as a freelance journalist. In 1849 he was employed by Horace Greeley at the New York Tribune, taking the role left vacant by Margaret Fuller. Greeley had been a proponent of Brook Farm's conversion to Fourierism. Ripley started his role with the Tribune at $12 a week and, at this wage, was not able to pay off the debt of Brook Farm until 1862. As a critic, he believed in high moral standards for literature but offered good-natured praise in the majority of his reviews. Greeley took advantage of Ripley's cheerful style of writing to boost circulation amid significant competition. Ripley wrote a "Gotham Gossip" column and many articles discussing local personalities and notable public events, including speeches by Henry Clay and Frederick Douglass. He stayed away from philosophy of theology, despite some efforts to persuade him to write on the subject. As he told a friend, he had "long since lost ... immediate interest in that line of speculation".

Ripley then edited Harper's Magazine. Together with Bayard Taylor he compiled a Handbook of Literature and the Fine Arts (1852).

With Charles A. Dana, he edited the 16 volume The New American Cyclopaedia (1857–1863), reissued as The American Cyclopaedia (1873–1876). It sold in the millions and its immediate earnings amounted to over $100,000.

He also continued his critical work and in 1860 reviewed On the Origin of Species by Charles Darwin. He was one of the few contemporary critics to be sympathetic to Darwin, although he was reluctant to show he was convinced of the theories.

=== Later years ===
Sophia Ripley died in 1861. George Ripley remarried, to Louisa Augusta Schlossberger (born in 1835 as Hoerner in Stuttgart, Germany), in 1865, and was a part of the Gilded Age New York literary scene for the remainder of his life. Because of his convivial nature, he was careful to avoid the city's rampant literary feuds at the time. He became a public figure with a national reputation and, known as an arbiter of taste, he helped establish the National Institute of Literature, Art, and Science in 1869. In his later years, he began suffering frequent illnesses, including a bout with influenza in 1875 which prevented him from traveling to Germany. He also suffered from gout and rheumatism.

Ripley was found dead at his desk on July 4, 1880, slumped over his work. Pallbearers at his funeral included Frederick Augustus Porter Barnard, George William Curtis, and Whitelaw Reid. At the time of his death, Ripley had become financially successful; the New American Cyclopaedia had earned him royalties of nearly $1.5 million. A biography entitled George Ripley (Boston: Houghton, Mifflin & Co., 1882) was written by Octavius Brooks Frothingham.

== Critical assessment ==
Ripley built a wide reputation as a critic. Contemporary publications rated him as one of the most important critics of the day, including the Hartford Courant, the Springfield Republican, the New York Evening Gazette, and the Chicago Daily Tribune. Henry Theodore Tuckerman commended Ripley as "a scholar and an aesthetic as well as technical critic: [he] knows public taste and the laws of literature".

== Sources ==
- Buell, Lawrence. Emerson. Cambridge, Massachusetts: The Belknap Press of Harvard University Press, 2003. ISBN 0-674-01139-2
- Crowe, Charles. George Ripley: Transcendentalist and Utopian Socialist. Athens, GA: University of Georgia Press, 1967.
- Delano, Sterling F. Brook Farm: The Dark Side of Utopia. Cambridge, Massachusetts: The Belknap Press of Harvard University Press, 2004. ISBN 0-674-01160-0
- Ehrlich, Eugene and Gorton Carruth. The Oxford Illustrated Literary Guide to the United States. New York: Oxford University Press, 1982. ISBN 0-19-503186-5
- England, Eugene. Beyond Romanticism: Tuckerman's Life and Poetry. New York: SUNY Press, 1991. ISBN 0-7914-0791-8
- Felton, R. Todd. A Journey into the Transcendentalists' New England. Berkeley, California: Roaring Forties Press, 2006. ISBN 0-9766706-4-X
- Golemba, Henry L. George Ripley. Boston: Twayne Publishers, 1977. ISBN 0-8057-7181-6
- Gura, Philip F. American Transcendentalism: A History. New York: Hill and Wang, 2007. ISBN 0-8090-3477-8
- Hankins, Barry. The Second Great Awakening and the Transcendentalists. Westport, Connecticut: Greenwood Press, 2004. ISBN 0-313-31848-4
- McFarland, Philip. Hawthorne in Concord. New York: Grove Press, 2004. ISBN 0-8021-1776-7
- Miller, Perry. The Raven and the Whale: Poe, Melville, and the New York Literary Scene. Baltimore: Johns Hopkins University Press, 1997 (originally published 1956). ISBN 0-8018-5750-3
- Packer, Barbara L. The Transcendentalists. Athens, Georgia: The University of Georgia Press, 2007. ISBN 978-0-8203-2958-1
- Rose, Anne C. Transcendentalism as a Social Movement, 1830–1850. New Haven, CT: Yale University Press: 1981. ISBN 0-300-02587-4
- Slater, Abby. In Search of Margaret Fuller. New York: Delacorte Press, 1978. ISBN 0-440-03944-4
