= George Putnam (minister) =

American minister, politician, and Transcendentalist (1807–1878)

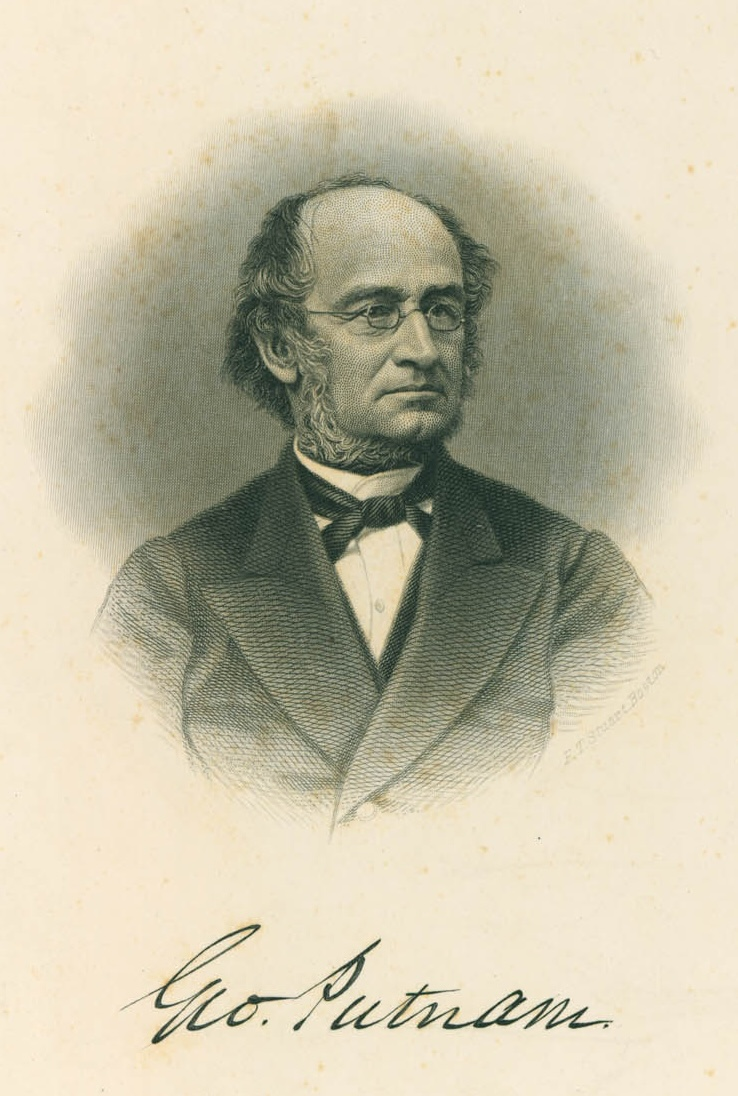
- Born: August 16, 1807; Sterling, Massachusetts, US
- Died: April 11, 1878 (aged 70); Roxbury, Massachusetts, US
- Burial place: Mount Auburn Cemetery
- Education: Harvard Divinity School; Harvard College
- Occupation: Minister
- Employer: First Church in Roxbury

George Putnam (August 16, 1807 – April 11, 1878) was an American minister and a founding member of the Transcendental Club of writers and intellectuals. A graduate of Harvard College and Harvard Divinity School, Putnam worked as pastor of the Unitarian First Church in Roxbury, Massachusetts, for nearly 50 years. He also served in the Massachusetts Legislature for two years and was a Fellow of Harvard Corporation.

== Early life and education ==
Putnam was born in Sterling, Massachusetts, on August 16, 1807, to Andrew and Jerusha (Clapp) Putnam. His father, a well-to-do farmer, died in 1809, leaving a widow and six children, of whom George was the youngest. He attended Leicester Academy and Groton Academy and graduated from Harvard College in 1826.

Soon after graduating, Putnam became headmaster at Duxbury Academy. While he was working in Duxbury, local minister Benjamin Kent and Hollis Professor of Divinity Henry Ware encouraged him to enter the ministry. Putnam enrolled at Harvard Divinity School in 1827 and received his Doctor of Divinity degree in 1830, becoming a Unitarian, in a departure from his family's Congregationalist denomination.

== Ministry and public service ==
During his divinity studies, Putnam settled at the First Church in Roxbury in the outskirts of Boston, serving as associate pastor to the Rev. Dr. Eliphalet Porter. His ordination as Unitarian pastor took place on July 7, 1830. When Porter died in 1833, Dr. Putnam assumed his pastorship, leading one of the oldest congregations in Massachusetts. He preached his first sermon at Roxbury on April 11, 1830, and remained until his death 48 years later. He was invited to take up the Hollis Chair at Harvard in 1845 but declined.

Putnam was a founding member of the Transcendental Club of writers and intellectuals, attending its first meeting on September 8, 1836, along with ministers George Ripley, Ralph Waldo Emerson, and Frederic Henry Hedge. At age 29, Putnam was the youngest of this quartet. He attended four of the ensuing meetings of the Club, the last on September 1, 1837, at Emerson's house.

Putnam was active in government and civil society. He served as a delegate to the Massachusetts Constitutional Convention of 1853 and was elected to the Massachusetts Legislature in 1869, serving two years in office. In 1864, he served as a presidential elector for Abraham Lincoln. He served as a trustee of the Boston Public Library (1868–1877) and of the Roxbury School Committee, as well as president of the trustees of Roxbury Latin School, the Boston Young Men's Christian Union, and the Fellowes Athenaeum (which became a branch of the Boston Public Library). Putnam was a Fellow of the Harvard Corporation from 1853 until his death, replacing James Walker on the board. In 1847, he was elected as a Fellow of the American Academy of Arts and Sciences.

On January 7, 1846, Putnam delivered the Massachusetts election sermon, a public address delivered by a prominent clergyman to the governor and legislature to mark the opening of the legislative session. Among other remarks, Putnam urged his listeners to invest in the commonwealth's public education and condemned slavery as "that most fearful stain that rests upon our national fame." In this address, he indicated that he opposed the expansion of slavery into new territories but favored tolerating it where it already existed.

In 1837, he delivered a lecture entitled "The Circuit of Waters" for the Boston Society for the Diffusion of Useful Knowledge.

== Personal life ==
In 1831, Putnam married Elizabeth Ann Ware, daughter of his mentor Henry Ware. The couple had three sons and two daughters. In their father's obituary, the sons' names were given as George, Henry Ware, and Charles. Elizabeth died on March 24, 1866.

Following a long illness, Putnam died at home in Roxbury on April 11, 1878. He was buried at Mount Auburn Cemetery. Putnam was succeeded in his Roxbury ministry by John Graham Brooks, who had served as his associate pastor since 1875.

== Printed sermons ==
- Putnam, George (1865). An address delivered before the city government and citizens of Roxbury on occasion of the death of Abraham Lincoln, late president of the United States, April 19, 1865. Roxbury, MA: L.B. & O.E. Weston, Printers.
- Putnam, George (1847). God and our country: a discourse delivered in the First Congregational Church in Roxbury, on Fast Day, April 8, 1847. Boston: W. Crosby and H.P. Nichols.
- Putnam, George (1846). A sermon delivered before His Excellency George N. Briggs, governor, His Honor John Reed, lieutenant governor, the honorable Council. Boston: Dutton and Wentworth, printers to the state.
- Putnam, George (1843). Our political idolatry. A discourse delivered in the First Church in Roxbury, on fast day, April 6, 1843 ... Boston: William Crosby & Co.
