= Transcendental Club =

Group of Transcendentalist members

The Transcendental Club was a group of New England authors, philosophers, socialists, politicians and intellectuals of the early-to-mid-19th century which gave rise to Transcendentalism.

== Overview ==
Frederic Henry Hedge, Ralph Waldo Emerson, George Ripley, and George Putnam, all Unitarian ministers and liberal intellectuals, met in Cambridge, Massachusetts, on September 8, 1836, to discuss the formation of a new club; their first official meeting was held eleven days later at Ripley's house in Boston. Attendees at ensuing meetings included Amos Bronson Alcott, Cyrus Augustus Bartol, Orestes Brownson, Theodore Parker, Henry David Thoreau, William Henry Channing, John Sullivan Dwight, James Freeman Clarke, Christopher Pearse Cranch, Convers Francis, Sylvester Judd, Ephraim Peabody, Chandler Robbins, Charles Follen, Caleb Stetson, Jones Very, and Charles Stearns Wheeler. Women members included Sophia Ripley, Margaret Fuller, Elizabeth Peabody, Ellen Sturgis Hooper, Caroline Sturgis Tappan, Elizabeth Hoar, Sarah Anne Freeman Clarke, and Sarah Bradford Ripley.

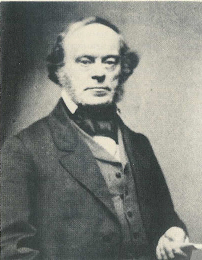
Frederic Henry Hedge

Originally, the group went by the name "Hedge's Club" because it usually met when Hedge was visiting from Bangor, Maine. The name Transcendental Club was given to the group by the public and not by its participants. The name was coined in a January 1837 review of Emerson's essay "Nature" and was intended disparagingly. James Elliot Cabot, a biographer of Emerson, wrote of the group as "the occasional meetings of a changing body of liberal thinkers, agreeing in nothing but their liberality". Hedge wrote: "There was no club in the strict sense... only occasional meetings of like-minded men and women". It was sometimes referred to by the nickname "the brotherhood of the 'Like-Minded'".

The club was a meeting-place for these young thinkers and an organizing ground for their idealist frustration with the general state of American culture and society at the time, and in particular, the state of intellectualism at Harvard University. Much of their thinking centered on the shortcomings of the Unitarian church.

Prominent American journals, including the North American Review and the Christian Examiner, refused to accept submissions from the Transcendental Club for publication. One early review of Emerson's poetry, for example, warned readers that his poems "are not sacred chants; they are hymns to the devil. Not God, but Satan, do they praise, and they can be relished only by devil-worshippers". In October 1839, members of the Transcendental Club had the idea of establishing their own periodical as a platform for their ideals. Initially, Brownson suggested utilizing his Boston Quarterly Review, though others thought their own magazine was necessary. Hedge, Parker, and Emerson declined the role of editor. Ripley served as the managing editor and Fuller accepted the editor position on October 20, 1839, though she was unable to begin work on the publication until the first week of 1840. The first issue of The Dial, with an introduction by Emerson calling it a "Journal in a new spirit", was published in July 1840.

The Transcendental Club likely did not have official meetings after September 1840, though they continued to correspond and attend each other's lectures. The Dial continued to be published, though it was never financially stable. In 1843, then business manager Elizabeth Peabody counted only two hundred subscribers and that its income was not covering production costs. It finally ceased publication in April 1844. Emerson's speech/essay "Nature" has been considered a manifesto of Transcendentalist ideas.

== Sources ==
- Perry Miller, The Transcendentalists (Harvard University Press, 1966). ISBN 1-56731-215-2, ISBN 0-674-90330-7, ISBN 0-674-90333-1.
