= Margaret Fuller =

American writer and women's activist (1810–1850)

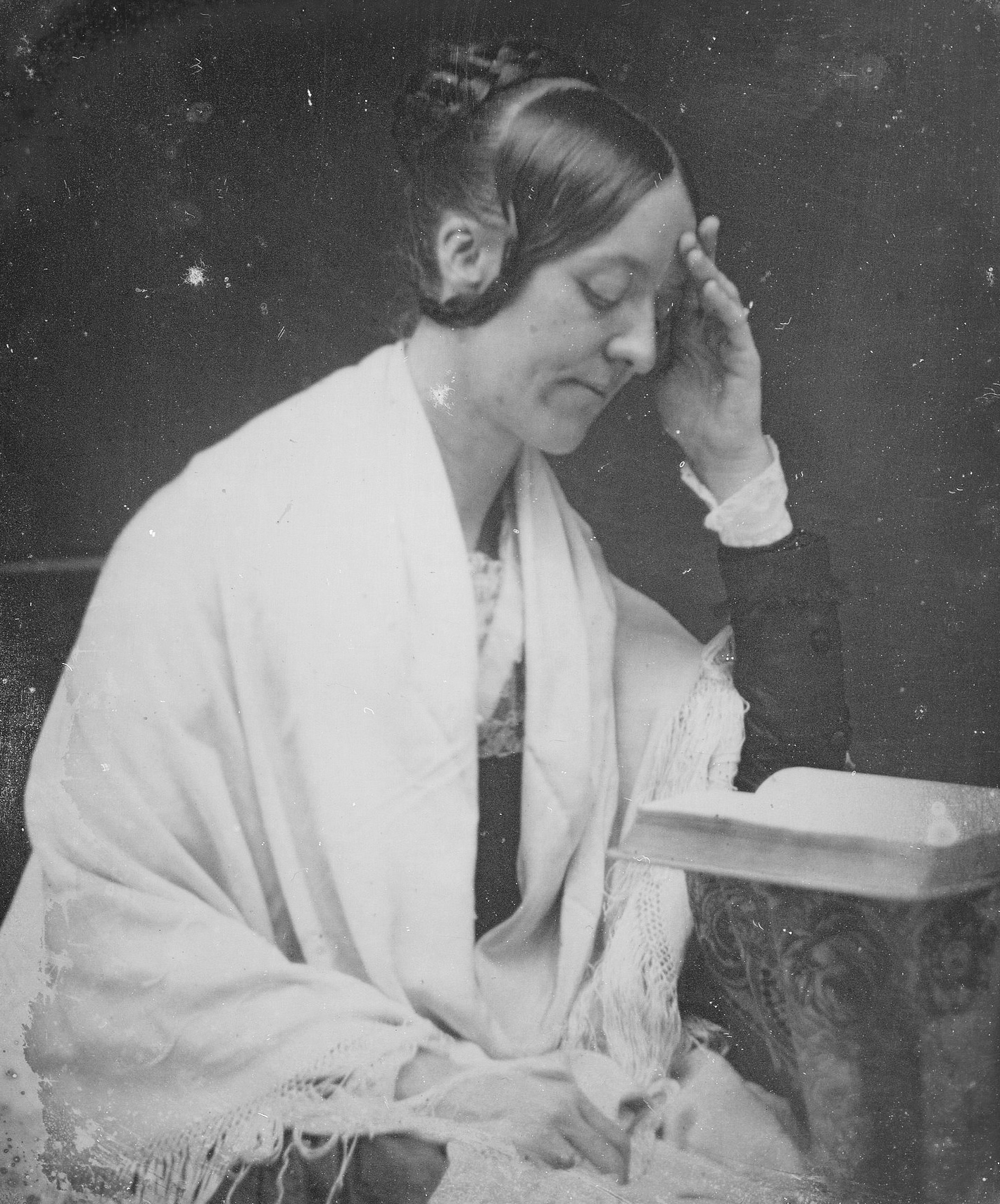
- Detail of the only known daguerreotype of Fuller (1846)
- Born: Sarah Margaret Fuller; May 23, 1810; Cambridgeport, Massachusetts, U.S.
- Died: July 19, 1850 (aged 40) off Fire Island, New York, U.S.
- Occupations: Teacher; journalist; critic
- Writing career
- Movement: Transcendentalism

Sarah Margaret Fuller (May 23, 1810 – July 19, 1850), sometimes referred to as Margaret Fuller Ossoli, was an American journalist, editor, critic, translator, and women's rights advocate associated with the American transcendentalism movement. She was the first American female war correspondent and full-time book reviewer in journalism. Her book Woman in the Nineteenth Century is considered the first major feminist work in the United States.

Born in Cambridgeport, Massachusetts, she was given a substantial early education by her father, Timothy Fuller, a lawyer who died in 1835 due to cholera. She later had more formal schooling and became a teacher before, in 1839, she began overseeing her Conversations series: classes for women meant to compensate for their lack of access to higher education. She became the first editor of the transcendentalist journal The Dial in 1840, which was the year her writing career started to succeed, before joining the staff of the New-York Tribune under Horace Greeley in 1844.

By the time she was in her 30s, Fuller had earned a reputation as the best-read person in New England, male or female, and became the first woman allowed to use the library at Harvard College. Her seminal work, Woman in the Nineteenth Century, was published in 1845. A year later, she was sent to Europe for the Tribune as its first female correspondent. She soon became involved with the revolutions in Italy and allied herself with Giuseppe Mazzini. She had a relationship with Giovanni Ossoli, with whom she had a child. All three members of the family died in a shipwreck off Fire Island, New York, as they were traveling to the United States in 1850. Fuller's body was never recovered.

Fuller was an advocate of women's rights and, in particular, women's education and the right to employment. Fuller, along with Samuel Taylor Coleridge, wanted to stay free of what she called the "strong mental odor" of female teachers. She also encouraged many other reforms in society, including prison reform and the emancipation of slaves in the United States. Many other advocates for women's rights and feminism, including Susan B. Anthony, cited Fuller as a source of inspiration. Many of her contemporaries, however, were not supportive, including her former friend Harriet Martineau, who said that Fuller was a talker rather than an activist. Shortly after Fuller's death, her importance faded. The editors who prepared her letters to be published, believing that her fame would be short-lived, censored or altered much of her work before publication.

== Biography ==
=== Early life and family ===
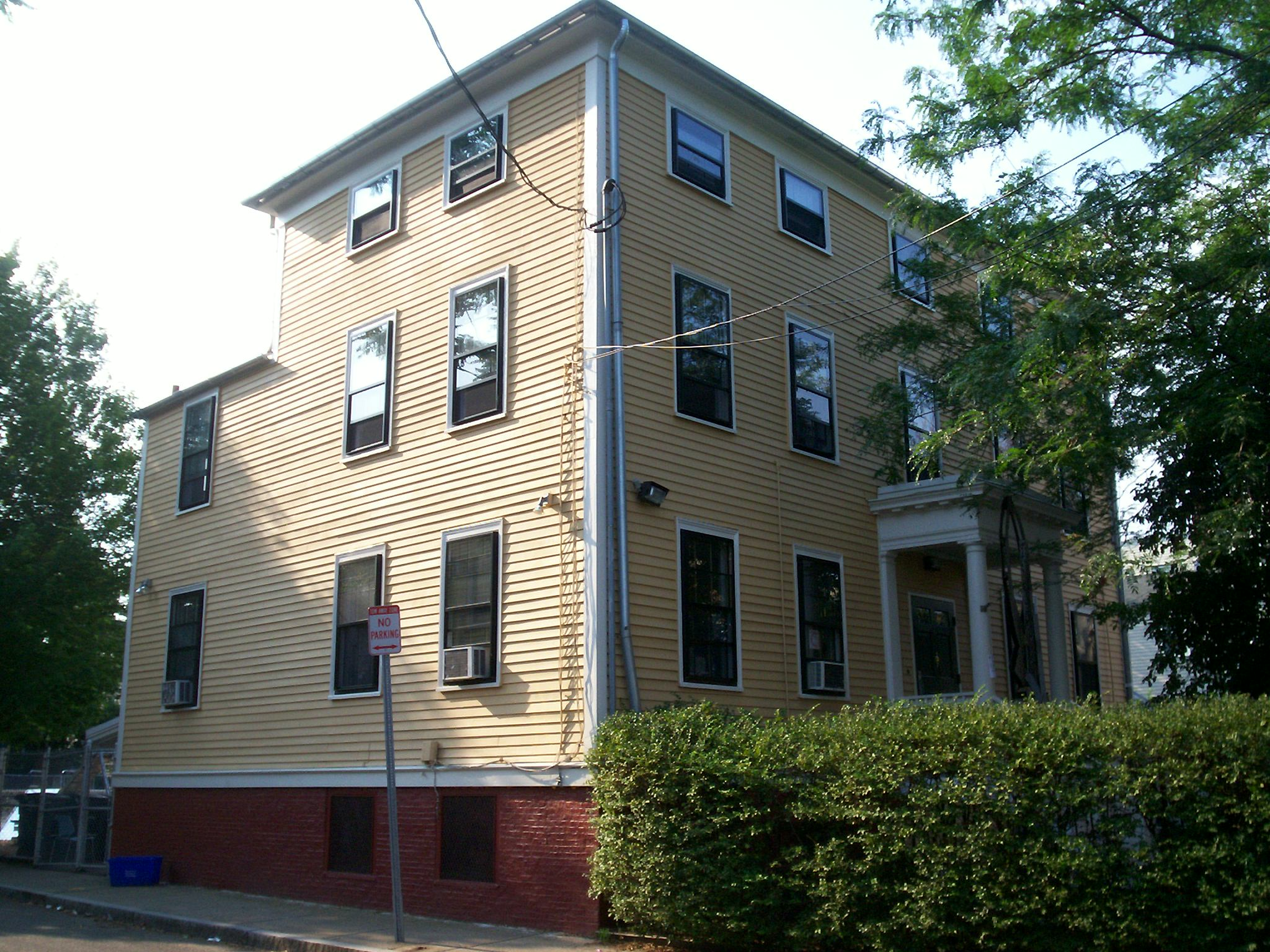
Birthplace and childhood home of Margaret Fuller

Sarah Margaret Fuller was born on May 23, 1810, in Cambridgeport, Massachusetts, the first child of Congressman Timothy Fuller and Margaret Crane Fuller. She was named after her paternal grandmother and her mother, but by age nine she dropped "Sarah" and insisted on being called "Margaret". The Margaret Fuller House, in which she was born, is still standing. Her father taught her to read and write at the age of three and a half, shortly after the couple's second daughter, Julia Adelaide, died at 14 months old. He offered her an education as rigorous as any boy's at the time and forbade her to read the typical feminine fare of the time, such as etiquette books and sentimental novels. He incorporated Latin into his teaching shortly after the birth of the couple's son Eugene in May 1815, and soon Margaret was translating simple passages from Virgil.

Later in life, Margaret blamed her father's exacting love and his valuation of accuracy and precision for her childhood nightmares and sleepwalking. During the day, Margaret spent time with her mother, who taught her household chores and sewing. In 1817, her brother William Henry Fuller was born, and her father was elected as a representative to the United States Congress. For the next eight years, he spent four to six months a year in Washington, D.C. At age ten, Fuller wrote a cryptic note which her father saved: "On 23 May 1810, was born one foredoomed to sorrow and pain, and like others to have misfortunes."

Fuller began her formal education at the Port School in Cambridgeport in 1819 before attending the Boston Lyceum for Young Ladies from 1821 to 1822. In 1824, she was sent to the School for Young Ladies in Groton, on the advice of aunts and uncles, though she resisted the idea at first. While she was there, Timothy Fuller did not run for re-election, in order to help John Quincy Adams with his presidential campaign in 1824; he hoped Adams would return the favor with a governmental appointment. On June 17, 1825, Fuller attended the ceremony at which the American Revolutionary War hero Marquis de Lafayette laid the cornerstone of the Bunker Hill Monument 50 years after the battle. The 15-year-old Fuller introduced herself to Lafayette in a letter which concluded: "Should we both live, and it is possible to a female, to whom the avenues of glory are seldom accessible, I will recal my name to your recollection." Early on, Fuller sensed herself to be a significant person and thinker. Fuller left the Groton school after two years and returned home at 16. At home, she studied the classics and trained herself in several modern languages and read world literature.

By this time, she realized she did not fit in with other young women her age. She wrote, "I have felt that I was not born to the common womanly lot." Eliza Farrar, wife of Harvard professor John Farrar and author of The Young Lady's Friend (1836), attempted to train her in feminine etiquette until the age of 20, but was never wholly successful.

=== Early career ===
Fuller was an avid reader, known for translating German literature and bringing German Romanticism to the United States. By the time she was in her 30s, she had earned a reputation as the best-read person, male or female, in New England. She used her knowledge to give private lessons based on the teaching style of Elizabeth Palmer Peabody. Fuller hoped to earn her living through journalism and translation; her first published work, a response to historian George Bancroft, appeared in November 1834 in the North American Review.

When she was 23, her father's law practice failed and he moved the family to a farm in Groton. On February 20, 1835, Frederic Henry Hedge and James Freeman Clarke asked her to contribute to each of their periodicals. Clarke helped her publish her first literary review in the Western Messenger in June: criticisms of recent biographies on George Crabbe and Hannah More. In the fall of that year, she developed a terrible migraine with a fever that lasted nine days. Fuller continued to experience such headaches throughout her life. While she was still recovering, her father died of cholera on October 2, 1835. She was deeply affected by his death: "My father's image follows me constantly", she wrote. She vowed to step in as the head of the family and take care of her widowed mother and younger siblings. Her father had not left a will, and two of her uncles gained control of his property and finances, later assessed at $18,098.15, (~$595,485 in 2025) and the family had to rely on them for support. Humiliated by the way her uncles were treating the family, Fuller wrote that she regretted being "of the softer sex, and never more than now".

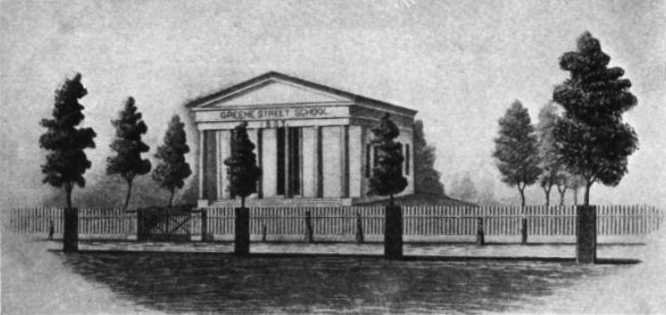
The Greene Street School where Fuller taught from 1837 to 1839

Around this time, Fuller was hoping to prepare a biography of Johann Wolfgang von Goethe, but felt that she could work on it only if she traveled to Europe. Her father's death and her sudden responsibility for her family caused her to abandon this idea. In 1836, Fuller was given a job teaching at Bronson Alcott's Temple School in Boston, where she remained for a year. She then accepted an invitation to teach under Hiram Fuller (no relation) at the Greene Street School in Providence, Rhode Island, in April 1837 with the unusually high salary of $1,000 (~$28,456 in 2025) per year. Her family sold the Groton farm and Fuller moved with them to Jamaica Plain, Massachusetts. On November 6, 1839, Fuller held the first of her Conversations, discussions among local women who met in the Boston home of the Peabodys. Fuller intended to compensate for the lack of women's education with discussions and debates focused on subjects including the fine arts, history, mythology, literature, and nature.

Serving as the "nucleus of conversation", Fuller also intended to answer the "great questions" facing women and encourage women "to question, to define, to state and examine their opinions". She asked her participants, "What were we born to do? How shall we do it? Which so few ever propose to themselves 'till their best years are gone by". In Conversations, Fuller was finally finding equal intellectual companions among her female contemporaries. A number of significant figures in the women's rights movement attended these gatherings, including Sophia Dana Ripley, Caroline Sturgis, and Maria White Lowell.

=== The Dial ===
In October 1839, Ralph Waldo Emerson was seeking an editor for his transcendentalist journal The Dial. After several declined the position, he offered it to Fuller, referring to her as "my vivacious friend." Emerson had met Fuller in Cambridge in 1835; of that meeting, he admitted: "she made me laugh more than I liked." The next summer, Fuller spent two weeks at Emerson's home in Concord. Fuller accepted Emerson's offer to edit The Dial on October 20, 1839, and began work in the first week of 1840. She edited the journal from 1840 to 1842, though her promised annual salary of $200 was never paid. Because of her role, she was soon recognized as one of the most important figures of the transcendental movement and was invited to George Ripley's Brook Farm, a communal experiment. Fuller never officially joined the community but was a frequent visitor, often spending New Year's Eve there. In the summer of 1843, she traveled to Chicago, Milwaukee, Niagara Falls, and Buffalo, New York; while there, she interacted with several Native Americans, including members of the Ottawa and the Chippewa tribes. She reported her experiences in a book called Summer on the Lakes, which she completed writing on her 34th birthday in 1844. The critic Evert Augustus Duyckinck called it "the only genuine book, I can think of, this season." Fuller used the library at Harvard College to do research on the Great Lakes region, and became the first woman allowed to use Harvard's library.

Fuller's "The Great Lawsuit" was written in serial form for The Dial. She originally intended to name the work The Great Lawsuit: Man 'versus' Men, Woman 'versus' Women; when it was expanded and published independently in 1845, it was entitled Woman in the Nineteenth Century. After completing it, she wrote to a friend: "I had put a good deal of my true self in it, as if, I suppose I went away now, the measure of my footprint would be left on earth." The work discussed the role that women played in American democracy and Fuller's opinion on possibilities for improvement. It has since become one of the major documents in American feminism. It is considered the first of its kind in the United States. Soon after the American publication of Woman in the Nineteenth Century, it was pirated and published by H.G. Clarke in England. Despite never receiving commissions due to a lack of international copyright laws, Fuller was "very glad to find it will be read by women" around the world.

=== New-York Tribune ===
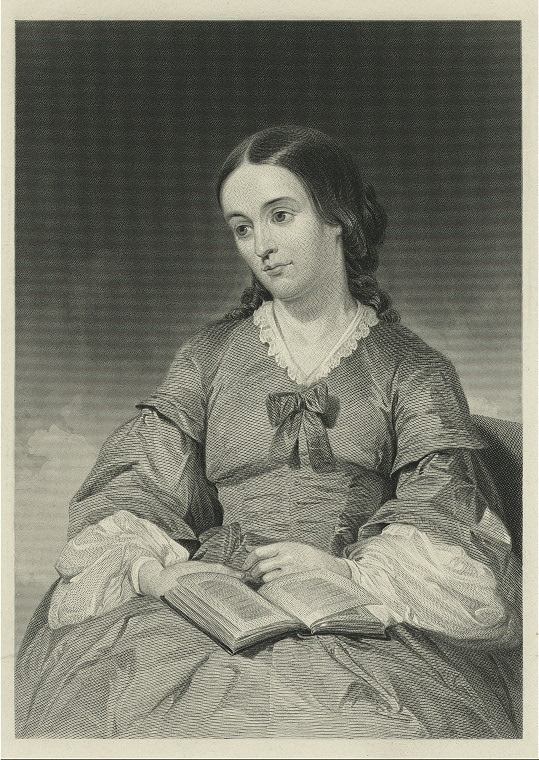
Engraving of Margaret Fuller

Fuller left The Dial in 1844 in part because of ill health but also because of her disappointment with the publication's dwindling subscription list. She moved to New York that autumn and joined Horace Greeley's New-York Tribune as a literary critic, becoming the first full-time book reviewer in American journalism and, by 1846, the publication's first female editor. Her first article, a review of a collection of essays by Emerson, appeared in the December 1, 1844, issue. At this time, the Tribune had some 50,000 subscribers and Fuller earned $500 a year for her work. In addition to American books, she reviewed foreign literature, concerts, lectures, and art exhibits. During her four years with the publication, she published more than 250 columns, most signed with a "*" as a byline. In these columns, Fuller discussed topics ranging from art and literature to political and social issues such as the plight of slaves and women's rights. She also published poetry; her poems, styled after the work of Emerson, do not have the same intellectual vigor as her criticism.

Around this time, she was also involved in a scandal involving fellow literary critic Edgar Allan Poe, who had been carrying on a public flirtation with the married poet Frances Sargent Osgood. Another poet, Elizabeth F. Ellet, had become enamored of Poe and jealous of Osgood and suggested the relationship between Poe and Osgood was more than an innocent flirtation. Osgood then sent Fuller and Anne Lynch Botta to Poe's cottage on her behalf to request that he return the personal letters she had sent him. Angered by their interference, Poe called them "Busy-bodies". A public scandal erupted and continued until Osgood's estranged husband, Samuel Stillman Osgood, stepped in and threatened to sue Ellet.

=== Assignment in Europe ===
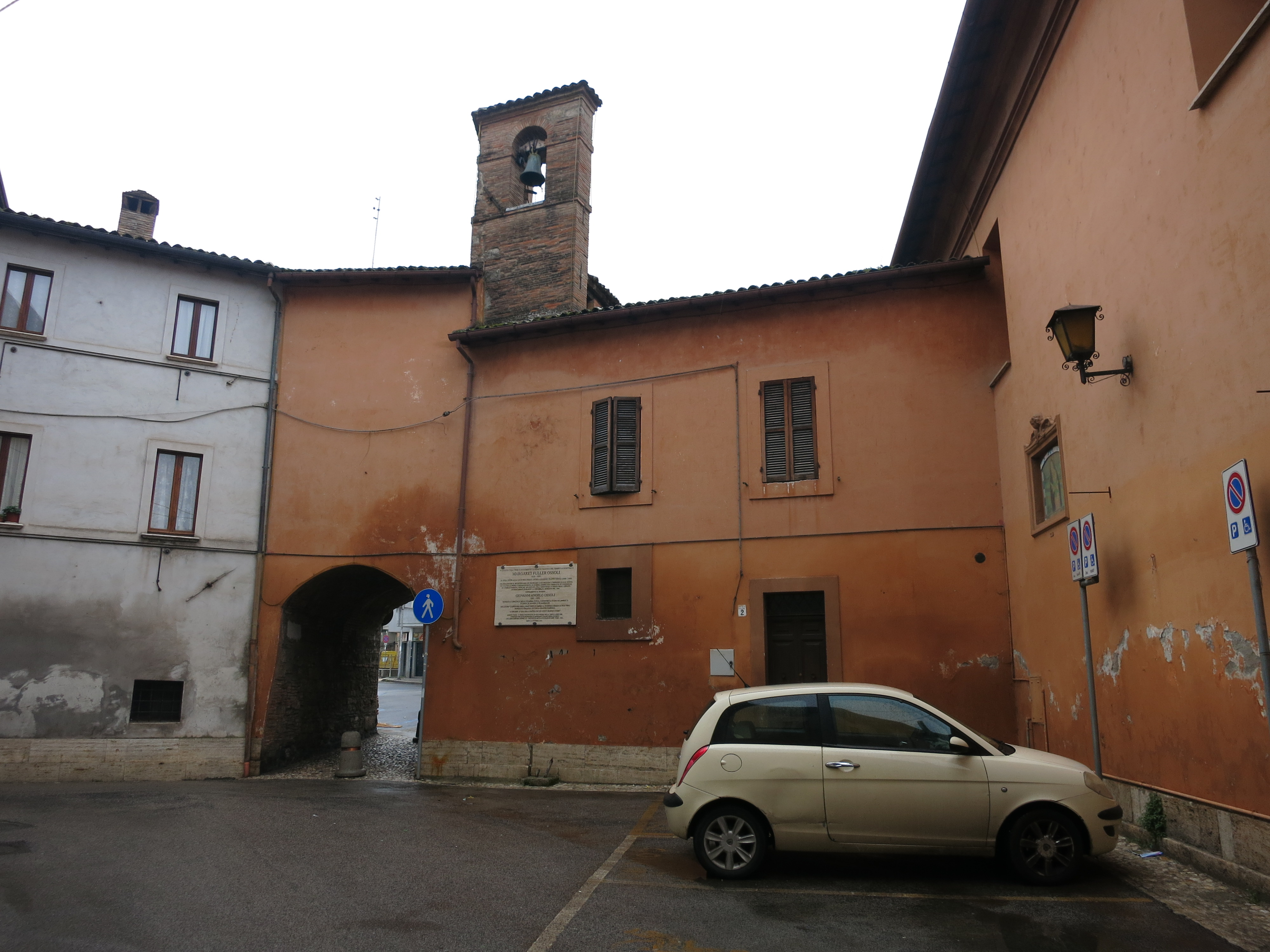
The house in Rieti, Italy where Margaret Fuller lived and gave birth to her son (the one on the left side of the arch, not where the plaque has been placed).

In 1846, the New-York Tribune sent Fuller to Europe, specifically England and Italy, as its first female foreign correspondent. She traveled from Boston to Liverpool in August on the Cambria, a vessel that used both sail and steam to make the journey in ten days and sixteen hours. Over the next four years she provided the Tribune with thirty-seven dispatches. She interviewed many prominent writers including George Sand and Thomas Carlyle—whom she found disappointing because of his reactionary politics, among other things. George Sand had previously been an idol of hers, but Fuller was disappointed when Sand chose not to run for the French National Assembly, saying that women were not ready to vote or to hold political office. Fuller was also given a letter of introduction to Elizabeth Barrett by Cornelius Mathews, but did not meet her at that time, because Barrett had just eloped with Robert Browning.

In England in the spring of 1846, she met Giuseppe Mazzini, who had been in exile there from Italy since 1837. Fuller also met the Roman patriot Marchese Giovanni Angelo Ossoli, a nobleman of modest means, employed at an uncle's commercial office, who volunteered in the Civic Guard (then National Guard). Fuller and Ossoli moved in together in Florence, Italy, likely before they were married; whether they ever married is uncertain. Fuller was originally opposed to marrying him, in part because she was Protestant and he was Catholic. Emerson speculated that the couple was "married perhaps in Oct. Nov. or Dec" of 1847, though he did not explain his reasoning. Biographers have speculated that the couple married on April 4, 1848, to celebrate the anniversary of their first meeting but one biographer provided evidence they first met on April 1 during the ceremony called "Lavanda degli Altari" (Altars Lavage). By the time the couple moved to Florence, they were referred to as husband and wife, though it is unclear if any formal ceremony took place. It seems certain that at the time their child was born, they were not married.

Around New Year's Day 1848, she suspected she was pregnant, but kept it from Ossoli for several weeks. Their child, Angelo Eugene Philip Ossoli, was born in early September 1848 and nicknamed Angelino. The couple was very secretive about their relationship, but after Angelino suffered an unnamed illness they became less so. Fuller informed her mother about Ossoli and Angelino in August 1849 in a letter that explained that she had kept silent so as not to upset her "but it has become necessary, on account of the child, for us to live publicly and permanently together." Her mother's response suggests that she was aware that the couple was not legally married. She was nevertheless happy for her daughter, writing: "I send my first kiss with my fervent blessing to my grandson."

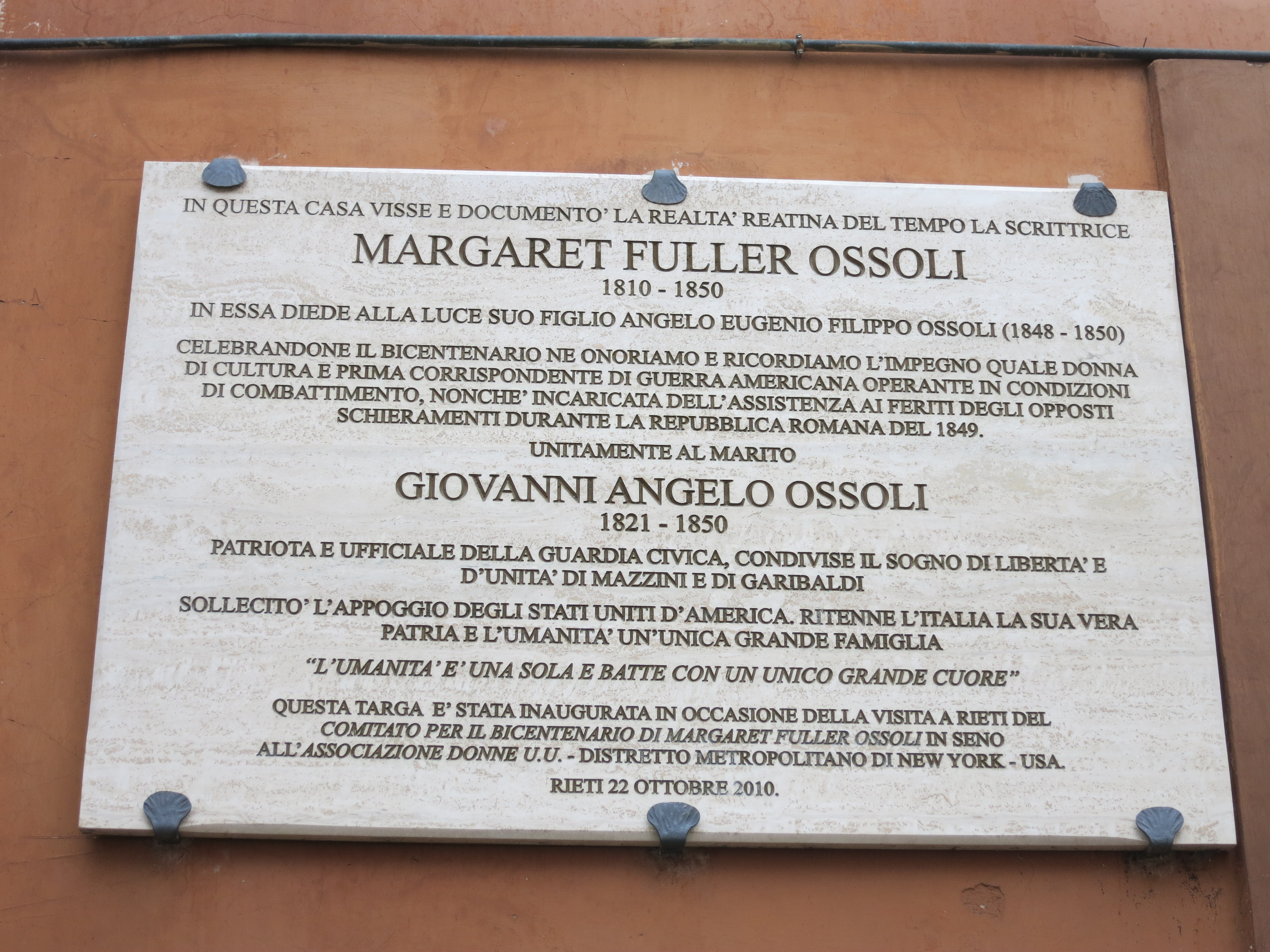
Plaque placed in 2010 on the house in Rieti

The couple supported Giuseppe Mazzini's movement for the establishment of a Roman Republic proclaimed on February 9, 1849, after it had been voted by the Constituent Assembly, elected by universal male suffrage in January 1849. The fundamental decree of the Roman Republic stated:

Art. 1. - The Pope has lapsed in fact and in law from the temporal government of the Roman State. Art. 2. —- The Roman Pontiff will have all the necessary guarantees for independence in the exercise of his spiritual power. Art. 3 - The form of the government of the Roman state will be pure democracy, and will take on the glorious name of Roman Republic. Art. 4. - The Roman Republic will have with the rest of Italy the relations required by the common nationality.

The Pope resisted this statement and asked for international intervention to be restored in his temporal power. Catholic mobilization on behalf of papal sovereignty was thus sparked. French zouaves were the first to respond to his appeal and besieged Rome. Ossoli fought on the ramparts of the Vatican walls while Fuller volunteered at two supporting hospitals. When the patriots they supported met defeat, the couple believed it safer to flee Rome and decided to move to Florence and, in 1850, to the United States. In Florence they finally met Elizabeth Barrett Browning. Fuller used her experience in Italy to begin a book about the history of the Roman Republic—a work she may have begun as early as 1847— and hoped to find an American publisher after a British one rejected it. She believed the work would be her most important, referring to it in a March 1849 letter to her brother Richard as "something good which may survive my troubled existence."

=== Death ===
In the beginning of 1850, Fuller wrote to a friend: "It has long seemed that in the year 1850 I should stand on some important plateau in the ascent of life ... I feel however no marked and important change as yet." Also that year, Fuller wrote: "I am absurdly fearful and various omens have combined to give me a dark feeling ... It seems to me that my future upon earth will soon close ... I have a vague expectation of some crisis—I know not what". A few days after writing this, Fuller, Ossoli, and their child began a five-week return voyage to the United States aboard the ship Elizabeth, an American merchant freighter carrying cargo that included mostly marble from Carrara. They set sail on May 17. At sea, the ship's captain, Seth Hasty, died of smallpox. Angelino contracted the disease and recovered.

Possibly because of the inexperienced first mate now serving as captain, the ship slammed into a sandbar less than 100 yards from Fire Island, New York, on July 19, 1850, around 3:30 a.m. Many of the other passengers and crew members abandoned ship. The first mate, Mr. Bangs, urged Fuller and Ossoli to try to save themselves and their child as he himself jumped overboard, later claiming he believed Fuller had wanted to be left behind to die. On the beach, people arrived with carts hoping to salvage any cargo washed ashore. None made any effort to rescue the crew or passengers of the Elizabeth, though they were only 50 yards from shore. Most of those aboard attempted to swim to shore, leaving Fuller and Ossoli and Angelino some of the last on the ship. Ossoli was thrown overboard by a massive wave and, after the wave had passed, a crewman who witnessed the event said Fuller could not be seen.

Henry David Thoreau traveled to New York City at the urging of Emerson to search the shore, but neither Fuller's body nor that of her husband was ever recovered. Angelino's had washed ashore. Few of their possessions were found other than some of the child's clothes and a few letters. Fuller's manuscript on the rise and fall of the 1849 Roman Republic, which she described as "what is most valuable to me if I live of any thing", was also lost. A memorial to Fuller was erected on the beach at Fire Island in 1901 through the efforts of Julia Ward Howe. A cenotaph to Fuller and Ossoli, under which Angelino is buried, is in Mount Auburn Cemetery in Cambridge, Massachusetts. The inscription reads, in part:

By birth a child of New England
By adoption a citizen of Rome
By genius belonging to the world

Within a week after her death, Horace Greeley suggested to Emerson that a biography of Fuller, to be called Margaret and Her Friends, be prepared quickly "before the interest excited by her sad decease has passed away". Many of her writings were soon collected together by her brother Arthur as At Home and Abroad (1856) and Life Without and Life Within (1858). He also edited a new version of Woman in the Nineteenth Century in 1855. In February 1852, The Memoirs of Margaret Fuller Ossoli was published, edited by Emerson, James Freeman Clarke, and William Henry Channing, though much of the work was censored or reworded. It left out details about her love affair with Ossoli and an earlier relationship with a man named James Nathan. The three editors, believing the public interest in Fuller would be short-lived and that she would not survive as a historical figure, were not concerned about accuracy. For a time, it was the best-selling biography of the decade and went through thirteen editions before the end of the century. The book focused on her personality rather than her work. Detractors of the book ignored her status as a critic and instead criticized her personal life and her "unwomanly" arrogance.

Since her death, the majority of Fuller's extant papers are kept at Houghton Library and Boston Public Library. She was also voted sixth in a mass magazine poll to select twenty American women for the Hall of Fame for Great Americans at University Heights in New York City in 1902.

== Beliefs ==
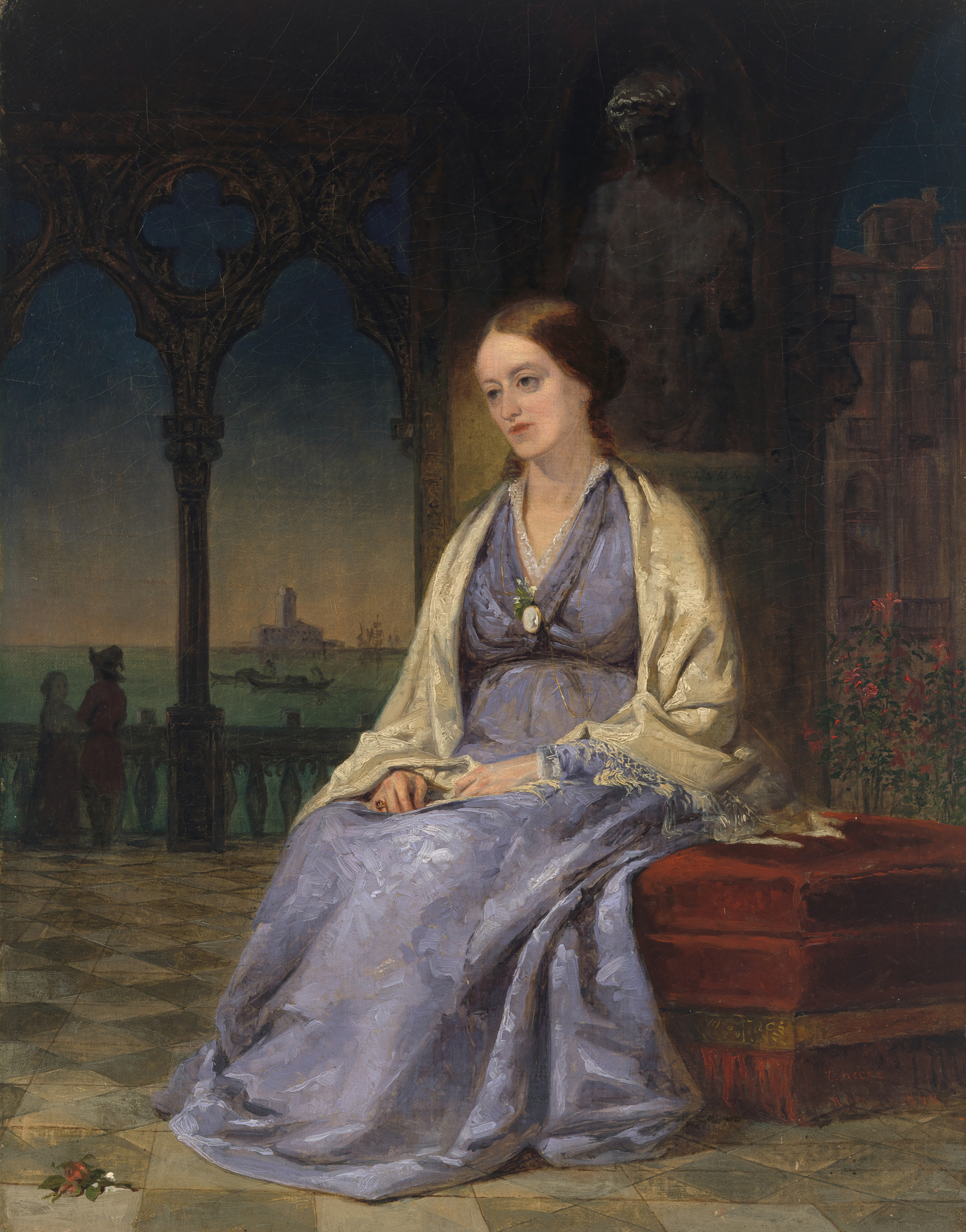
Oil on canvas painting of Margaret Fuller by Thomas Hicks (1848). Housed at the National Portrait Gallery (United States).

Fuller was an early proponent of feminism and especially believed in providing education to women. Once equal educational rights were afforded women, she believed, women could push for equal political rights as well. She advocated that women seek any employment they wish, rather than catering to the stereotypical "feminine" roles of the time, such as teaching. She once said, "If you ask me what office women should fill, I reply—any ... let them be sea captains if you will. I do not doubt that there are women well fitted for such an office". She had great confidence in all women but doubted that a woman would produce a lasting work of art or literature in her time and disliked the popular female poets of her time. Fuller also warned women to be careful about marriage and not to become dependent on their husbands. As she wrote, "I wish woman to live, first for God's sake. Then she will not make an imperfect man for her god and thus sink to idolatry. Then she will not take what is not fit for her from a sense of weakness and poverty". By 1832, she had made a personal commitment to stay single. Fuller also questioned a definitive line between male and female: "There is no wholly masculine man ... no purely feminine" but that both were present in any individual. She suggested also that within a female were two parts: the intellectual side (which she called the Minerva) and the "lyrical" or "Femality" side (the Muse). She admired the work of Emanuel Swedenborg, who believed men and women shared "an angelic ministry", as she wrote, as well as Charles Fourier, who placed "Woman on an entire equality with Man". Unlike several contemporary women writers, including "Mrs. Sigourney" and "Mrs. Stowe", she was familiarly referred to in a less formal manner as "Margaret".

Fuller also advocated reform at all levels of society, including prison. In October 1844, she visited Sing Sing and interviewed the women prisoners, even staying overnight in the facility. Sing Sing was developing a more humane system for its women inmates, many of whom were prostitutes. Fuller was also concerned about the homeless and those living in dire poverty, especially in New York. She also admitted that, though she was raised to believe "that the Indian obstinately refused to be civilized", her travels in the American West made her realize that the white man unfairly treated the Native Americans; she considered Native Americans an important part of American heritage. She also supported the rights of African-Americans, referring to "this cancer of slavery", and suggested that those who were interested in the abolition movement follow the same reasoning when considering the rights of women: "As the friend of the Negro assumes that one man cannot by right hold another in bondage, so should the Friend of Woman assume that Man cannot by right lay even well-meant restrictions on Woman." She suggested that those who spoke against the emancipation of slaves were similar to those who did not support the emancipation of Italy.

Fuller agreed with the transcendental concern for the psychological well-being of the individual, though she was never comfortable being labeled a transcendentalist. Even so, she wrote, if being labeled a transcendentalist means "that I have an active mind frequently busy with large topics I hope it is so". She criticized people such as Emerson, however, for focusing too much on individual improvement and not enough on social reform. Like other members of the so-called Transcendental Club, she rebelled against the past and believed in the possibility of change. However, unlike others in the movement, her rebellion was not based on religion. Though Fuller occasionally attended Unitarian congregations, she did not entirely identify with that religion. As biographer Charles Capper has noted, she "was happy to remain on the Unitarian margins."

Fuller has been cited as a vegetarian because she criticized the slaughter of animals for food in her book Woman in the Nineteenth Century. However, biographer Margaret Vanderhaar Allen wrote that Fuller did not fully endorse vegetarianism as she was repelled by the fanaticism and moral rigorism of vegetarians.

== Critical response ==
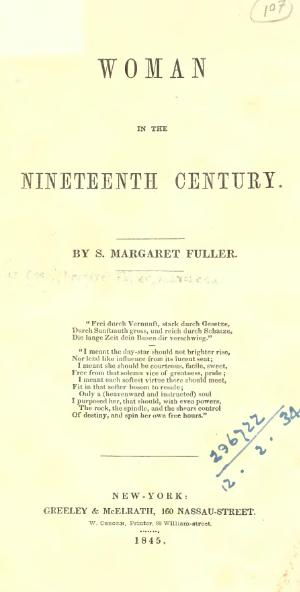
Title page of Woman in the Nineteenth Century (1845)

Margaret Fuller was especially known in her time for her personality and, in particular, for being overly self-confident and having a bad temper. This personality was the inspiration for the character Hester Prynne in Nathaniel Hawthorne's novel The Scarlet Letter, specifically her radical thinking about "the whole race of womanhood". She may also be the basis for the character Zenobia in another of Hawthorne's works, The Blithedale Romance. Hawthorne and his then-fiancée Sophia had first met Fuller in October 1839.

She was also an inspiration to poet Walt Whitman, who believed in her call for the forging of a new national identity and a truly American literature. Elizabeth Barrett Browning was also a strong admirer, but believed that Fuller's unconventional views were unappreciated in the United States and therefore she was better off dead. She also said that Fuller's history of the Roman Republic would have been her greatest work: "The work she was preparing upon Italy would probably have been more equal to her faculty than anything previously produced by her pen (her other writings being curiously inferior to the impressions her conversation gave you)". An 1860 essay collection, Historical Pictures Retouched, by Caroline Healey Dall, called Fuller's Woman in the Nineteenth Century "doubtless the most brilliant, complete, and scholarly statement ever made on the subject". Despite his personal issues with Fuller, the typically harsh literary critic Edgar Allan Poe wrote of the work as "a book which few women in the country could have written, and no woman in the country would have published, with the exception of Miss Fuller", noting its "independence" and "unmitigated radicalism". Thoreau also thought highly of the book, suggesting that its strength came in part from Fuller's conversational ability, and called it "rich extempore writing, talking with pen in hand".

Another admirer of Fuller was Susan B. Anthony, a pioneer of women's rights, who wrote that Fuller "possessed more influence on the thought of American women than any woman previous to her time". Fuller's work may have partially inspired the Seneca Falls Convention in 1848. Anthony, along with Elizabeth Cady Stanton and Matilda Joslyn Gage, wrote in their History of Woman Suffrage that Fuller "was the precursor of the Women's Rights agitation". Modern scholars have suggested Woman in the Nineteenth Century was the first major women's rights work since Mary Wollstonecraft's A Vindication of the Rights of Woman (1792), though an early comparison between the two women came from George Eliot in 1855. It is unclear if Fuller was familiar with Wollstonecraft's works; in her childhood, her father prevented her from reading them. In 1995, Fuller was inducted into the National Women's Hall of Fame.

Fuller was not without her critics. A one-time friend, the English writer Harriet Martineau, was one of her harshest detractors after Fuller's death. Martineau said that Fuller was a talker rather than an activist, that she had "shallow conceits" and often "looked down upon persons who acted instead of talking finely ... and despised those who, like myself, could not adopt her scale of valuation". The influential editor Rufus Wilmot Griswold, who believed she went against his notion of feminine modesty, referred to Woman in the Nineteenth Century as "an eloquent expression of her discontent at having been created female". New York writer Charles Frederick Briggs said that she was "wasting the time of her readers", especially because she was an unmarried woman and therefore could not "truly represent the female character". English writer and critic Matthew Arnold scoffed at Fuller's conversations as well, saying, "My G–d, [sic] what rot did she and the other female dogs of Boston talk about Greek mythology!" Sophia Hawthorne, who had previously been a supporter of Fuller, was critical of her after Woman in the Nineteenth Century was published:

The impression it left was disagreeable. I did not like the tone of it—& did not agree with her at all about the change in woman's outward circumstances ... Neither do I believe in such a character of man as she gives. It is altogether too ignoble ... I think Margaret speaks of many things that should not be spoken of.

Fuller had angered fellow poet and critic James Russell Lowell when she reviewed his work, calling him "absolutely wanting in the true spirit and tone of poesy ... his verse is stereotyped, his thought sounds no depth; and posterity will not remember him." In response, Lowell took revenge in his satirical A Fable for Critics, first published in October 1848. At first he considered excluding her entirely, but ultimately gave her what was called the "most wholly negative characterization" in the work. Referring to her as Miranda, Lowell wrote that she stole old ideas and presented them as her own, she was genuine only in her spite and "when acting as censor, she privately blows a censer of vanity 'neath her own nose".

Shortly after Fuller's death, her importance faded. Her obituary in the newspaper she had once edited, the Daily Tribune, said that her works had a few great sentiments, "but as a whole they must commend themselves mainly by their vigor of thought and habitual fearlessness rather than freedom of utterance". As biographer Abby Slater wrote, "Margaret had been demoted from a position of importance in her own right to one in which her only importance was in the company she kept". Years later, Hawthorne's son Julian wrote, "The majority of readers will, I think, not be inconsolable that poor Margaret Fuller has at last taken her place with the numberless other dismal frauds who fill the limbo of human pretension and failure." Thomas R. Mitchell claims that Julian Hawthorne purposely misrepresented his father Nathaniel's journal entries concerning Fuller, in order to benefit his father's literary reputation at the expense of Fuller's. In the twentieth century, American writer Elizabeth Hardwick wrote an essay called "The Genius of Margaret Fuller" (1986). She compared her own move from Boston to New York to Fuller's, saying that Boston was not a good place for intellectuals, despite the assumption that it was the best place for intellectuals.

== Legacy ==
In 1995, Fuller was inducted into the National Women's Hall of Fame.

On June 21, 2016, a historical marker in honor of Fuller was placed in Polhill Park in Beacon, New York, to commemorate her stay at Van Vliet boarding house. For the dedication ceremony, Fuller's poem, "Truth and Form", was set to music by Debra Kaye and performed by singer Kelly Ellenwood.

In May 2026, the Concord Free Public Library in Massachusetts unveiled a statue of Margaret Fuller. The statue, sculpted by artist Penelope Jencks, is the first outdoor sculpture of a woman in the town. It was commissioned by Ronald Lee Fleming of Cambridge in 1985 with the intent of being installed in Harvard Square, but was not accepted. After decades in his personal garden, it was donated to the library.

== Selected works ==
- Summer on the Lakes (1844)
- Woman in the Nineteenth Century (1845)
- Papers on Literature and Art (1846)

Posthumous editions

- Memoirs of Margaret Fuller Ossoli (1852)
- At Home and Abroad (1856)
- Life Without and Life Within (1858)

== See also ==
- Buckminster Fuller, her grandnephew
- George Livermore, a childhood classmate
- Boston Women's Heritage Trail
- Ossoli Circle

== Sources ==
- Blanchard, Paula. Margaret Fuller: From Transcendentalism to Revolution. Reading, Massachusetts: Addison-Wesley Publishing Company, 1987. ISBN 0-201-10458-X
- Brooks, Van Wyck. The Flowering of New England. New York: E. P. Dutton and Company, Inc., 1952.
- Cheever, Susan. American Bloomsbury: Louisa May Alcott, Ralph Waldo Emerson, Margaret Fuller, Nathaniel Hawthorne, and Henry David Thoreau; Their Lives, Their Loves, Their Work. Detroit: Thorndike Press, 2006. ISBN 0-7862-9521-X
- Deiss, Joseph Jay. The Roman Years of Margaret Fuller. New York: Thomas Y. Crowell Company, 1969. ISBN 978-0-690-01017-6 ISBN 0-690-01017-6
- Douglas, Ann. The Feminization of American Culture. New York: Alfred A. Knopf, 1977. ISBN 0-394-40532-3
- Dickenson, Donna. Margaret Fuller: Writing a Woman's Life. New York: St. Martin's Press, 1993. ISBN 0-312-09145-1
- Gura, Philip F. American Transcendentalism: A History. New York: Hill and Wang, 2007. ISBN 0-8090-3477-8
- Marshall, Megan. Margaret Fuller: A New American Life. New York: Mariner Books, 2013. ISBN 978-0-547-19560-5
- Matteson, John. The Lives of Margaret Fuller: A Biography. New York: W.W. Norton, 2012.
- Slater, Abby. In Search of Margaret Fuller. New York: Delacorte Press, 1978. ISBN 0-440-03944-4
- Von Mehren, Joan. Minerva and the Muse: A Life of Margaret Fuller. Amherst: University of Massachusetts Press, 1994. ISBN 1-55849-015-9
