= Elizabeth Peabody =

American educator (1804–1894)

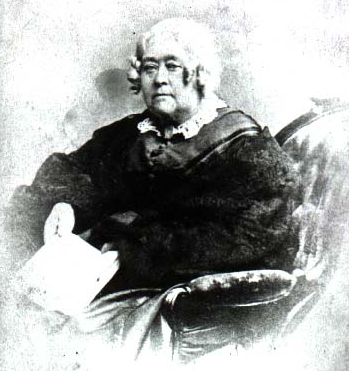
- Born: May 16, 1804; Billerica, Massachusetts, U.S.
- Died: January 3, 1894 (aged 89); Jamaica Plain, Massachusetts, U.S.
- Burial place: Sleepy Hollow Cemetery
- Education: Tutored in Greek by Ralph Waldo Emerson
- Occupations: Teacher, schoolmistress, writer, editor, and publisher
- Parents: Nathaniel Peabody; Elizabeth "Eliza" Palmer
- Relatives: Sophia Peabody Hawthorne (sister); Mary Tyler Peabody Mann (sister)

Elizabeth Palmer Peabody (May 16, 1804 – January 3, 1894) was an American educator who opened the first English-language kindergarten in the United States. Long before most educators, Peabody embraced the premise that children's play has intrinsic developmental and educational value.

With a grounding in history and literature and a reading knowledge of ten languages, in 1840, she also opened a bookstore that held Margaret Fuller's "Conversations". She published books from Nathaniel Hawthorne and others in addition to the periodicals The Dial and Æsthetic Papers. She was an advocate of antislavery and of Transcendentalism.

Peabody also led efforts for the rights of the Paiute Indians. She was the first translator into English of the Buddhist scripture the Lotus Sutra, translating a chapter from its French translation in 1844. It was the first English version of any Buddhist scripture.

== Personal life ==
=== Early years ===
Peabody was born in Billerica, Massachusetts, on May 16, 1804. She was the eldest daughter of Nathaniel Peabody, a physician, and Elizabeth (née Palmer) Peabody, the granddaughter of Joseph Palmer, a general during the American Revolutionary War. The Peabodys were a two-income family. Elizabeth advocated for preschool child education and taught school. Nathaniel was an apothecary, doctor, and dentist. Her sisters were Mary, reformer, educator, and pioneer in establishing kindergarten schools and Sophia, painter and the wife of Nathaniel Hawthorne. Peabody had three brothers, Nathaniel, George Francis, and Wellington Peabody. George and Wellington died in the twenties. Nathaniel relied on Peabody for his living expenses.

The Peabody family lived in Salem, Massachusetts, and worshiped at the Second Church (later Unitarian Church) there. The children received a thorough education at home. Elizabeth Peabody operated a school from the family home, providing a classical education for boys and girls. Nathaniel tutored the Peabody children. Peabody developed an interest in philosophy, theology, literature, and history over the years and she spoke ten languages.

In 1820, the Peabodys moved to a farm in Lancaster, Massachusetts, and Peabody taught and ran the school beginning at age 16, based on what she learned from her mother's tutelage. Peabody taught from an enlightened perspective, helping her students build character, grow spiritually, and engage in discussions about school work. In 1822, the Peabodys left the farm life of Lancaster for the social city life of Salem, where Nathaniel worked as a dentist.

=== The Peabody sisters ===
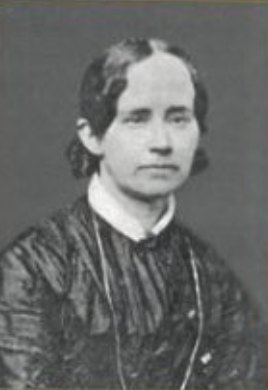
Mary Tyler Peabody Mann

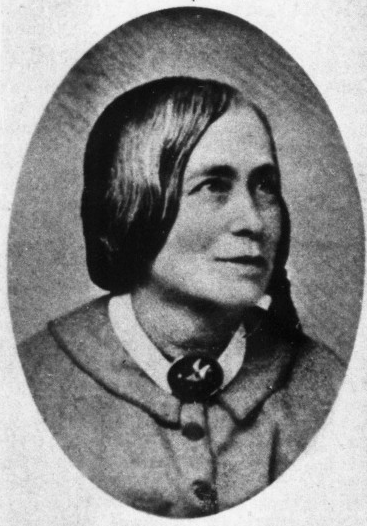
Sophia Peabody Hawthorne

The Peabody sisters, intelligent and capable on their own, were stronger together. Sophia was an artist. Elizabeth and Mary were educators who played significant roles in the creation of kindergarten programs and improvements to traditional education. In 1825, Peabody and Mary lived in a boarding house on Beacon Hill, where they met a fellow boarder Horace Mann in 1832 or 1833. Rebecca Clarke, the mother of James Freeman Clarke, operated the boarding house, Ashburton Place. Living there at the time were George Stillman Hillard, Edward Kennard Rand, and Jared Sparks. The sisters were Unitarians who embraced the Transcendentalism movement and supported fellow Transcendentalists Henry David Thoreau and Nathaniel Hawthorne. Hawthorne later married Sophia.

Horace Mann, a widower, came to Boston to recuperate from losing his wife. Elizabeth and Mary frequently talked with him about their lives and viewpoints. Sometimes, they read to one another. The young women helped Mann manage what Josephine E. Roberts called his "hopeless sorrow". Peabody shared an interest in education with Horace Mann. Although working in the fields of politics and the law, Mann had developed his educational theories.

In 1833, Mary went to Cuba, where she worked as a governess and looked after her sister Sophia, who went to the country to recuperate from some medical conditions. Mary and Sophia lived there until 1835 when they returned to Salem, where Mary taught until 1840. During that time, Mary and Mann stayed in contact via letters. Mann visited and wrote to Elizabeth periodically to learn what she knew of Mary. Mary questioned Elizabeth about the affection and "brotherly tenderness" she shared with Mann during his visits. After Mary returned from Cuba, Mann visited and wrote Mary regularly in Salem in friendship and confidence, to the exclusion of her sister.

=== Transcendentalism ===
Peabody developed a network of intellectual friends and transcendentalists, including Ralph Waldo Emerson, Henry David Thoreau, Nathaniel Hawthorne, William Ellery Channing, Bronson Alcott, and Jones Very, who in 1837 founded the Transcendentalist Club. They sought to question traditional religious and societal thinking, and develop their political, philosophical, and literary views of the world. They advanced the belief in the inherent goodness of people.

=== Personal life after 1852 and death ===
After Peabody shut down the West Street Bookshop in 1852, she moved in with her parents in West Newton, Massachusetts, and cared for them. Peabody moved in with her sister Mary in Concord in 1859.

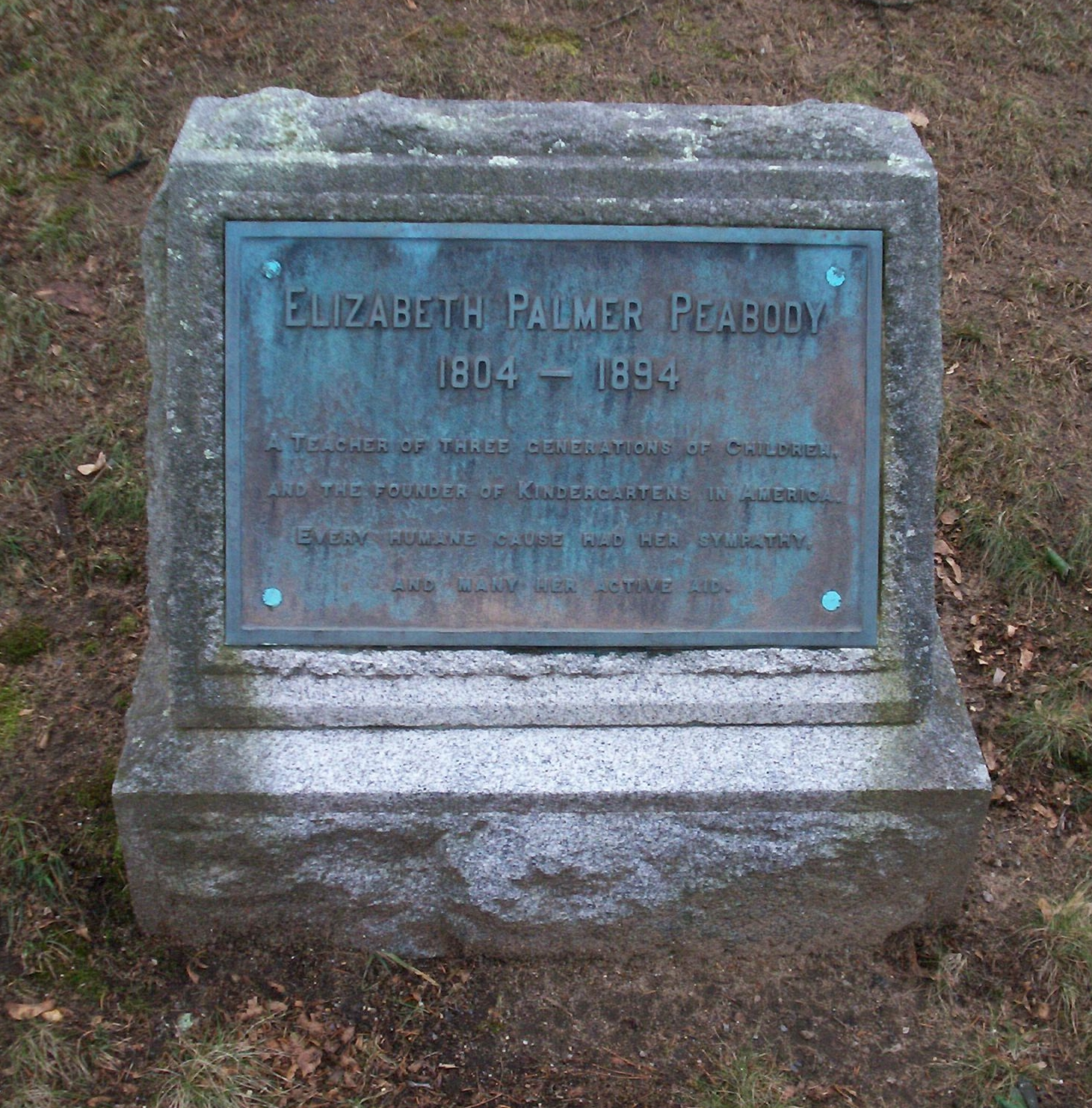
Elizabeth Peabody's grave

Peabody died on January 3, 1894, aged 89. She is buried at Sleepy Hollow Cemetery in Concord, Massachusetts.

=== Legacy ===
The Elizabeth Peabody House in Somerville, MA continues to educate children, after evolving from an early 20th century settlement house and moving out of the West End of Boston.

== Career ==
=== Educator ===
Peabody operated a private school for girls in Boston from 1822 to 1823. She was a governess to the children of Benjamin Vaughn in Hallowell, Maine, and taught other children in Maine. In 1825, Peabody set up a school in Boston, and Mary helped run it. Peabody and Mary developed an "active interest" in the work of Samuel Gridley Howe and his school, Perkins School for the Blind, after they visited the school with Mann, who sat on the board of trustees.

After 1822, Peabody resided principally in Boston where she engaged in teaching. She also became a writer and a prominent figure in the Transcendental movement. Peabody and her sister Mary operated a school in Brookline, Massachusetts, from 1825 to 1832, when there was a scandal about finances. Peabody opened a school for women to empower women. She held reading parties, gave lectures, and conducted discussions on a variety of subjects.

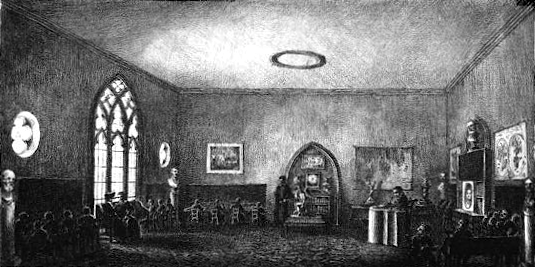
Bronson Alcott's Temple School opened in 1834 in the Masonic Temple, Tremont Street, Boston. Engraving by Pendelton's Lithography

During 1834 and 1835, Peabody worked as an assistant teacher to Amos Bronson Alcott at his experimental Temple School in Boston. After the school closed, Peabody published Record of a School, outlining the plan of the school and Alcott's philosophy of early childhood education, which had drawn on German models.

=== Kindergarten ===
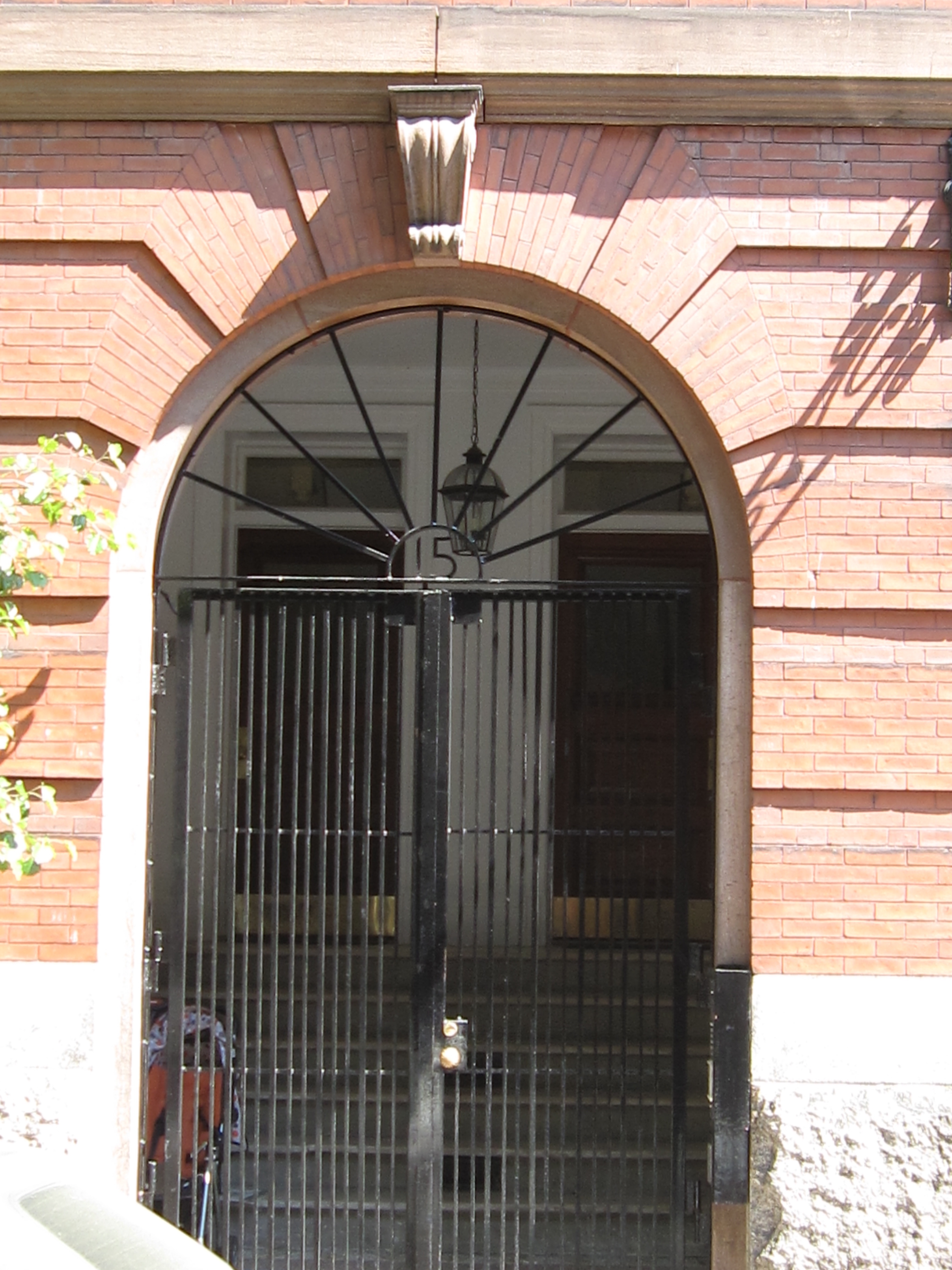
Site of Elizabeth and Mary Peabody's Kindergarten, Pinckney Street, Boston, Massachusetts

In 1859 or 1860, Peabody opened the first English language kindergarten in the country on Beacon Hill in Boston with her sister Mary. They influenced the creation of public kindergarten schools. The school taught reading, writing, arithmetic, gymnastics, singing, and French. They encouraged moral and positive social engagement among the children. The sisters wrote the Moral Culture of Infancy and Kindergarten Guide in 1863 to provide information about how to set up and operate a kindergarten.

When Peabody opened her kindergarten in 1860, the practice of providing formal schooling for children younger than six was largely confined to Germany. She had a particular interest in the educational methods of Friedrich Fröbel, particularly after meeting one of his students, Margarethe Schurz, in 1859. In 1867, Peabody visited Germany to study Fröbel's teachings more closely. Through her kindergarten and as editor of the Kindergarten Messenger (1873–1877), Peabody helped establish kindergarten as an accepted institution in American education. In 1877, she organized the American Froebel Union. She also wrote numerous books in support of the cause. The extent of her influence is apparent in a statement submitted to Congress on February 12, 1897, in support of free kindergartens:

The advantage to the community in utilizing the age from 4 to 6 in training the hand and eye; in developing the habits of cleanliness, politeness, self-control, urbanity, industry; in training the mind to understand numbers and geometric forms, to invent combinations of figures and shapes, and to represent them with the pencil—these and other valuable lessons… will, I think, ultimately prevail in securing to us the establishment of this beneficent institution in all the city school systems of our country.

=== Bookstore owner ===
In 1840, Peabody established the West Street Bookshop near Beacon Hill and Boston Common in Boston and had a home above the bookstore where her sisters and parents lived with her. Sophia and Mary lived there until they were married. Peabody purchased foreign journals and books for her business, which was part bookstore, a lending library, and a place for scholars, liberal thinkers, and transcendentalists to meet. (Note: The 1840 Catalogue of the Foreign Library offered several hundred titles in German, French, Spanish, Italian and English languages, including: Mrs. John Adams' Letters; Andryane's Memoires d'un Prisonnier de'Etate au Spielberg; Bentley's Miscellany; Bonnycastle's Spanish America; Boston Quarterly Review; Buche's Ruins of Cities; Channing's Slavery; Crocker's Fairy Legends; Dumeril's Elemens des sciences Naturelles; Mrs. Farrar's Howard's Life; Fraser's Magazine; Guarini's Pastor Fido; Haydn et Mozart lettres; Herder's Hebrew Poetry; Junger's Lustspiele; Lanzi's Storia Pittorica; Lessing's Nathan der Weise; Metropolitan Magazine; Miss Mitford's Our Village; Musical Journal; Isaac Taylor's Natural History of Enthusiasm; Sara Coleridge's Phantasmion; Pringle's Residence in South Africa; Revue des deux Mondes; George Sand's André; Madame Necker de Saussure's Notice sur le caractère et les écrits de Mme de Staël; Cockton's Valentine Vox, illus. by Cruikshank; Vie de Poussin)

It was there that Margaret Fuller held "Conversations" for women beginning on November 6, 1839. Topics for these discussions and debates included fine arts, history, mythology, literature, and nature. Fuller served as the "nucleus of conversation" and hoped to answer the "great questions" facing women: "What were we born to do? How shall we do it? which so few ever propose to themselves 'till their best years are gone by", Many figures in the woman's rights movement took part, including Sophia Dana Ripley, Caroline Sturgis, and Maria White Lowell.

Peabody lived above the bookstore until 1852, (Note: The Salem Public Library states that she closed the store in 1850. On March 27, 1850, Peabody stated that she had let her old stock sell out, and had now restocked the store with new goods. She sold good out of the store in May 1851. A notice from March 1852 stated that the business was closing down. Sampson R. Urbino bought Peabody's book stock in the mid-1850s.) when the bookstore and library closed down. Members of the Transcendentalist movement had begun to disperse since the mid-1840s, and income from the bookstore gradually declined. In 2011, the Boston Landmarks Commission designated the building a Boston Landmark.

=== The Dial ===
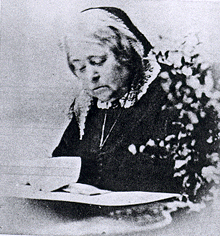
Elizabeth Peabody

For a time, Peabody was the business manager of The Dial, the main publication of the Transcendentalists. In 1843, she noted that the journal's income was not covering the cost of printing and that subscriptions totaled just over two hundred. In 1844 the magazine published Peabody's translation of a chapter of the Lotus Sutra from French, which was the first English version of a Buddhist scripture. The publication ceased shortly thereafter in April 1844.

=== Author and publisher ===
Peabody published antislavery literature and books, like Civil Disobedience by Henry David Thoreau and children's stories written by Nathaniel Hawthorne. She was one of the country's first female publisher. In the 1860s and 1870s, Peabody wrote about social and educational reform, producing 50 articles and 10 books.

== Selected works ==
Peabody published and authored a number of works, including this selection:

- Peabody, Elizabeth (1835). Record of a school: exemplifying the general principles of spiritual culture. Boston: J. Munroe and Company. About Bronson Alcott's Temple School, Boston.
- Peabody, Elizabeth Palmer; Bem, Józef (1850). The Polish-American System of Chronology. Boston: George Palmer Putnam. OCLC 197976248.
- Peabody, E. P. (Elizabeth Palmer), ed. (1852). Crimes of the House of Austria. New York: G. B. Putnam.
- Mann, Mary Tyler Palmer; Peabody, Elizabeth Palmer (1864). Moral Culture of Infancy. New York: Putnam.
- Peabody, Elizabeth (1870). Educational Tracts: Kindergarten Culture. Washington, D.C.: Publisher not identified. OCLC 191312802.
- Peabody, Elizabeth Palmer; United States Bureau of Education (1872). "Kindergarten in Italy". U. S. Bureau of Education Circular. OCLC 900889743.
- Peabody, Elizabeth Palmer (1880). Reminiscences of Rev. Wm Ellery Channing, D.D. OCLC 1087346697. About William Ellery Channing
- Peabody, Elizabeth Palmer (1886), Letters to Kindergarteners
- Peabody, Elizabeth Palmer (1887). "Last Evening with Allston, and other Papers". Emerson's magazine. About Washington Allston. Also published in Putnam's monthly.
- Peabody, Elizabeth Palmer (2018) [1888]. Lectures in the Training Schools for Kindergartners. Forgotten Books. ISBN 978-1-5279-5468-7. OCLC 1381177637.

== See also ==
- Susan Blow
- Maria Kraus-Boelté
- Elizabeth Pabodie
- Boston Women's Heritage Trail
- Margaret Fuller

== Bibliography ==
- Roberts, Josephine E. (1945). "Horace Mann and the Peabody Sisters". The New England Quarterly. 18 (2): 164–180. doi:10.2307/361283. ISSN 0028-4866. JSTOR 361283.
- Seavey, Lura Rogers (2004). "Elizabeth Palmer Peabody". More Than Petticoats: Remarkable Massachusetts Women. Twodot. ISBN 978-0-7627-2599-1.
- Tharp, Louise Hall (1953). Until victory : Horace Mann and Mary Peabody. Boston: Little, Brown.
