= Ralph Waldo Emerson House =

Historic house in Massachusetts, United States

- U.S. National Register of Historic Places
- U.S. National Historic Landmark
- U.S. Historic district – Contributing property
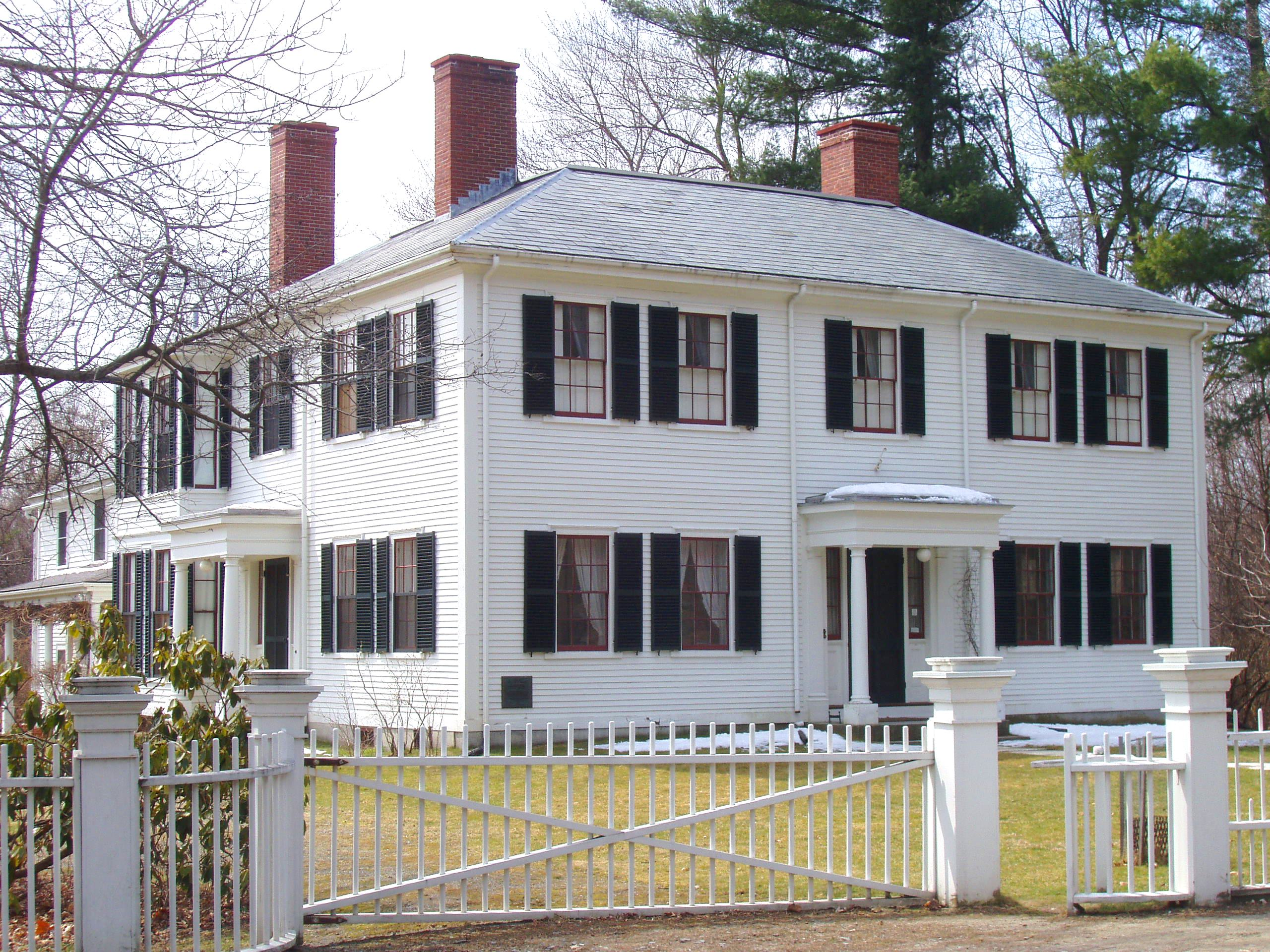

- Location within Massachusetts Location within the United States
- Location: Concord, Massachusetts
- Coordinates: 42°27′27″N 71°20′39″W
- Built: 1828
- Part of: Concord Monument Square-Lexington Road Historic District (ID66000365)
- NRHP reference No.: 66000365

Significant dates
- Added to NRHP: October 15, 1966
- Designated NHL: December 29, 1962
- Designated CP: September 13, 1977

The Ralph Waldo Emerson House is a house museum located at 18 Cambridge Turnpike, Concord, Massachusetts, and a National Historic Landmark for its associations with American philosopher Ralph Waldo Emerson. He and his family named the home Bush. The museum is open mid-April to mid-October; an admission fee is charged.

== History ==
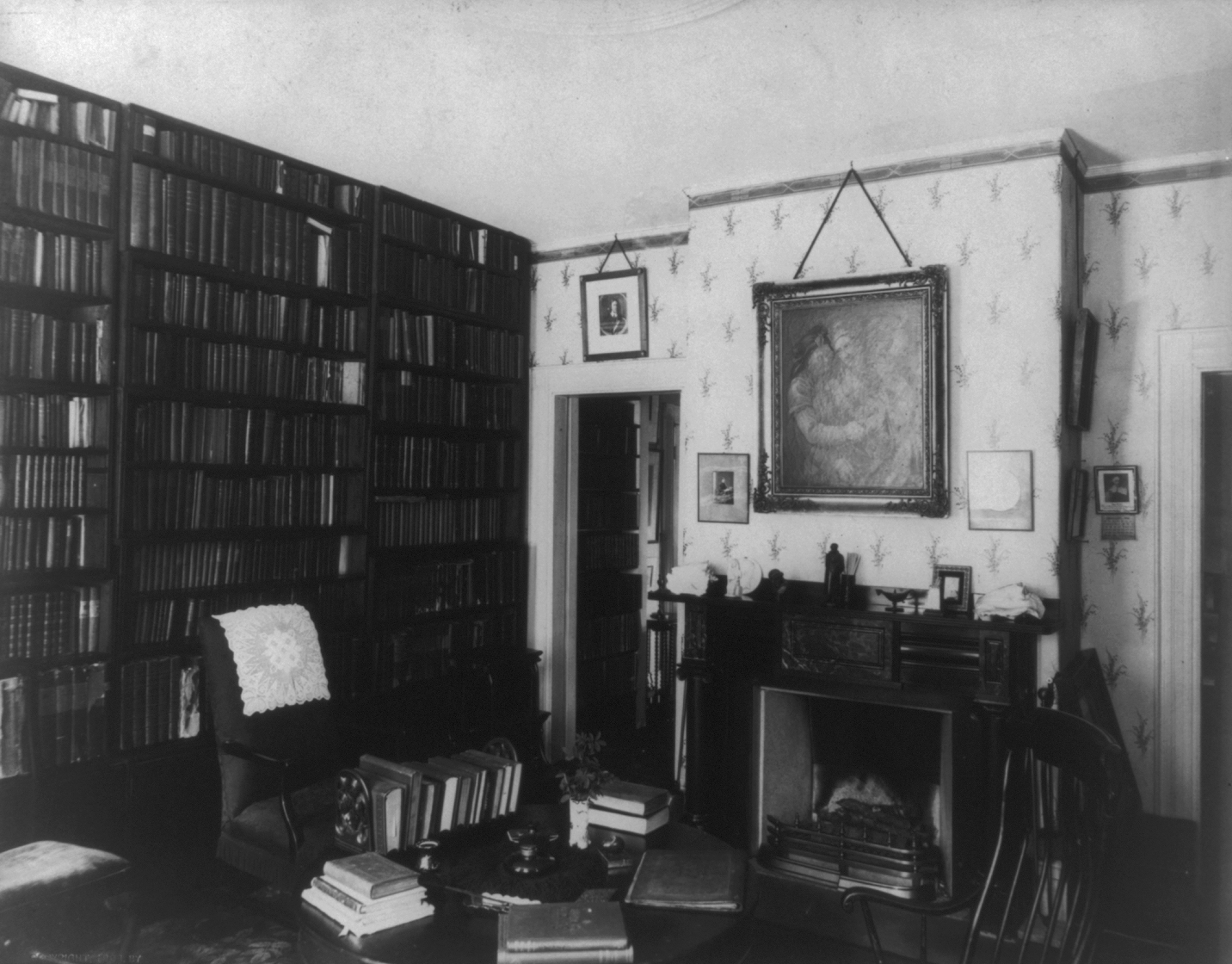
Emerson's study at Bush, shortly after his death

The house was built in 1828 by the Coolidge family and named "Coolidge Castle". It was used as a summer house on the village outskirts, beside the Cambridge and Concord Turnpike. It is a four-square, two-story frame building in a house style common to many New England towns.

While Ralph Waldo Emerson was preparing to marry Lydia Jackson (whom he called "Lidian"), he told her he could not live in her home town of Plymouth, Massachusetts. "Plymouth is streets", he wrote to her, "I live in the wide champaign." He had previously lived in Concord at The Old Manse, the Emerson family home, and hoped to return to that town. In July 1835, he wrote in his journal, "I bought my house and two acres six rods of land of John T. Coolidge for 3,500 dollars." He and Jackson married on September 14 and moved into the home the next day, along with his mother.

Emerson was pleased to avoid the trouble of building. However, in a contemporary letter to his brother William, he writes: "It is in a mean place, and cannot be fine until trees and flowers give it a character of its own". To that end, he spent between $400 and $500 for enlargements and finishing. The money came from a settlement with the family of his first wife, Ellen Tucker, who had died young. He wrote that he hoped to "crowd so many books and papers, and, if possible, wise friends into it, that it shall have as much wit as it can carry." It became a central meeting place for philosophers, idealists, and poets.

Emerson remained in the house for the rest of his life. In it he wrote his famous essays "The American Scholar" and "Self Reliance". He also entertained a host of notable neighbors and visitors including Bronson and Louisa May Alcott, Margaret Fuller, and Henry David Thoreau. Beginning in July 1836, the home hosted the meetings of the Transcendental Club, a group which included Orestes Brownson, Theodore Parker, and others.

In April 1841, Thoreau accepted an invitation to move into Bush with the family. As Emerson described to his brother William: "He is to have his board, etc., for what labor he chooses to do, and he is thus far a great benefactor... for he is an indefatigable and very skillful laborer". Thoreau later built his well-known cabin on Emerson's property at Walden Pond. After his experiment in living deliberately, he returned to Bush in September 1847 and stayed there until the next July.

While living in the house, Emerson published his book of Essays in 1841, as well as a second series of essays in 1844. He also published two volumes of poetry, Poems in 1846 and May-Day and Other Pieces in 1867. Emerson made his living as a lecturer in New England and beyond; by the 1850s he was giving as many as 80 per year. He eventually gave some 1,500 lectures in his lifetime. His earnings allowed him to expand his property, buying 11 acres (45,000 m^{2}) of land by Walden Pond and a few more acres in a neighboring pine grove. He wrote that he was "landlord and waterlord of 14 acres, more or less" in 1844. A year later, he purchased another 40 acres at Walden stretching to an area that became known as Emerson's Cliff.

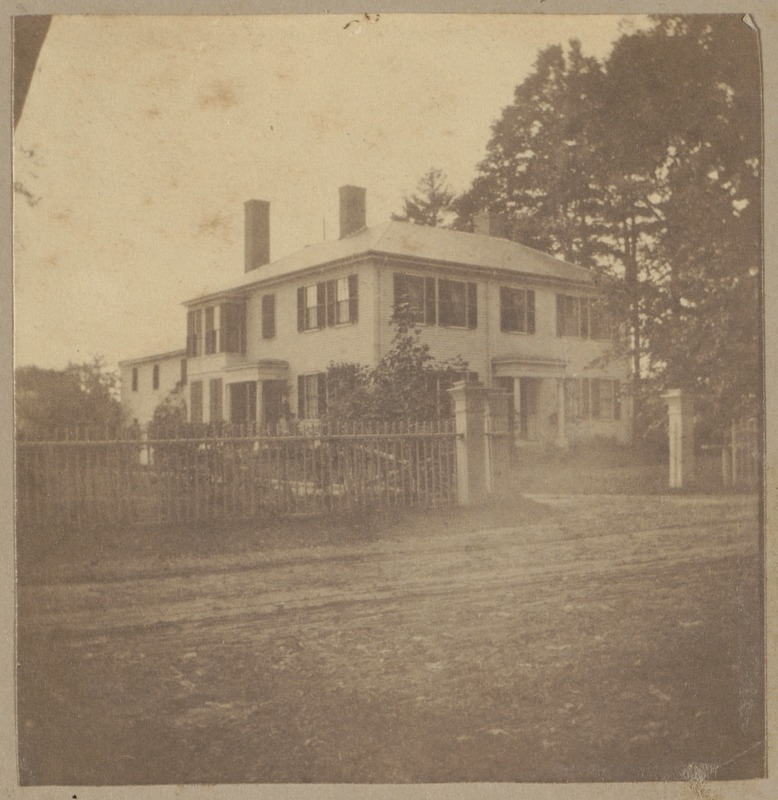
Concord, Emerson House, 1828, ca. 1895–1905. Archive of Photographic Documentation of Early Massachusetts Architecture, Boston Public Library.

The house caught fire on the morning of July 24, 1872, and Emerson ran out to call for help from neighbors. After the fire was put out, friends took up a collection to pay for repairs, raising some $12,000 in total, and sending the Emersons to Europe and Egypt while the house was restored. In 1873 the Emersons returned to reoccupy the house.

Emerson died in the house in 1882, and in 1892 his wife Lidian followed. Their daughter Ellen Tucker Emerson, who remained unmarried, lived in the house until her death in 1909. Other friends and relatives lived here until 1948.

== House today ==
Today the house is still owned by the family. It was first opened to the public in 1930 as a private museum; it continues to operate as a museum, open on a seasonal basis.

The interior furnishings remain much as they did when Emerson lived in the home, with original furniture and Emerson's memorabilia. The exception is the furniture and books from his study, which are now on display in the Concord Museum across the street. His personal book collection has been moved to Harvard University's Houghton Library.

== See also ==
- List of National Historic Landmarks in Massachusetts
- List of residences of American writers
- National Register of Historic Places in Concord, Massachusetts
