= Sophia Ripley =

American transcendentalist community founder

Sophia Willard Dana Ripley (1803–1861), wife of George Ripley, was a 19th-century feminist associated with Transcendentalism and the Brook Farm community.

== Biography ==
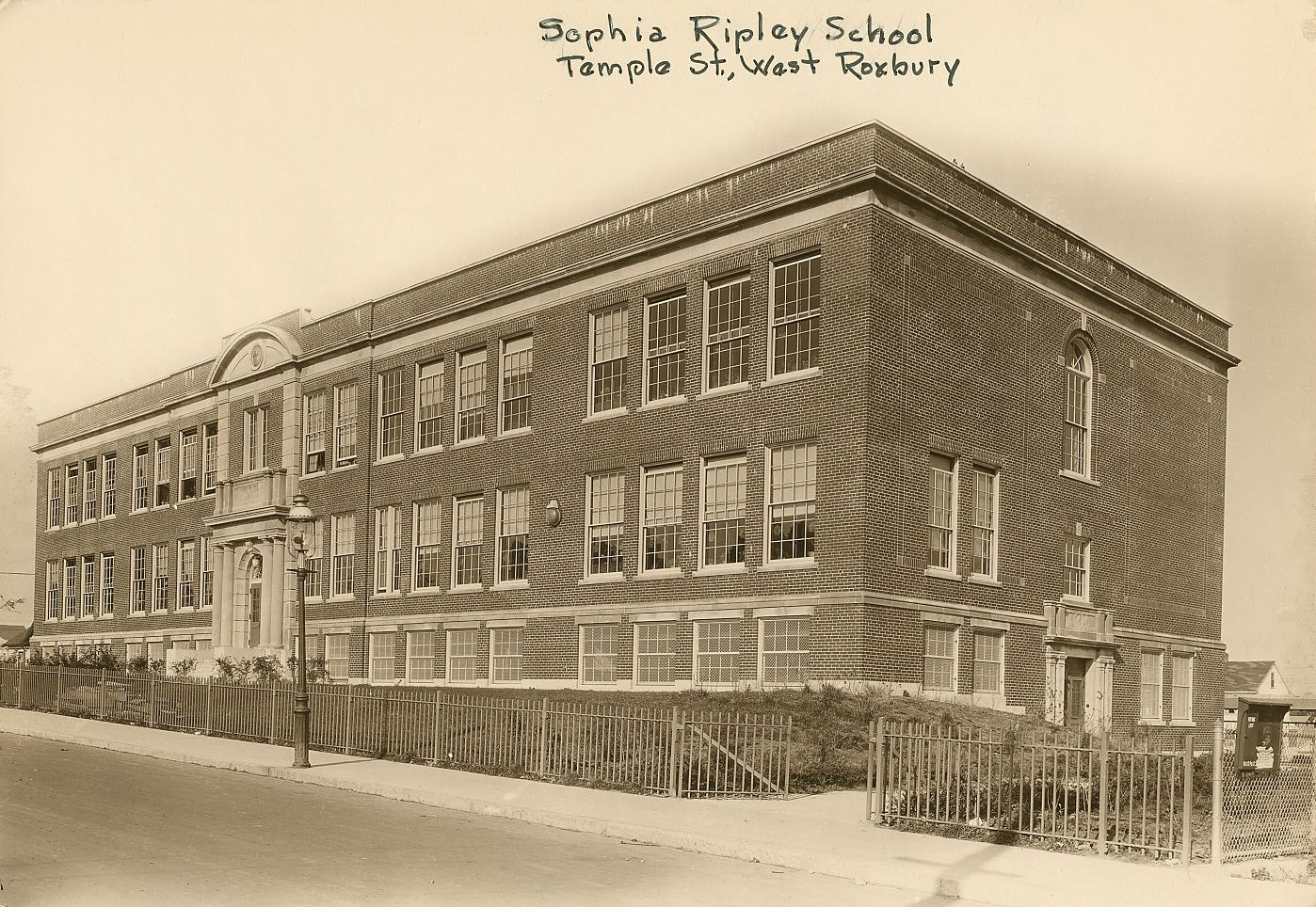
Sophia Ripley School

She was born Sophia Willard Dana in 1803. Her father traveled abroad often and left his daughters to fend for themselves. In 1823, during one of his trips, the Dana sisters decided to earn their own living by teaching. In Cambridge, Massachusetts, they established a girls' school; Sophia Dana served as the principal teacher.

She first met George Ripley during his final year as a student at the Harvard Divinity School in 1825. In 1826, they became engaged, though Ripley did not tell his parents right away. He asked his sister Marianne to inform them, assuring them that their relationship was not based on "any romantic or sudden passion" but on "intellectual power, moral worth, deep and true Christian piety, and refinement and dignity of character". They were officially married on 22 August 1827, in a ceremony presided over by Abiel Holmes.

Mrs. Ripley became a friend of Margaret Fuller and was one of the women to attend Fuller's first series of "conversations". Fuller explained to Ripley her goals: "It is to pass in review the departments of thought and knowledge, and endeavor to place them in due relation to one another in our mind. To systemize thought and give precision and clearness in which our sex are so deficient, chiefly, I think, because they have so few inducements to test and classify what they receive. To ascertain what pursuits are best suited to us". Ripley was also among the few regular women guests of the male-dominated Transcendental Club in the 1830s, and she published an essay on women in The Dial. In July 1841,The Dial published a letter from Ripley called "Letter from Zoar", an account of her experience visiting a communistic society of "Separatists" in Zoar, Ohio in 1837.

In the 1840s, she co-founded an experimental Utopian community called Brook Farm along with her husband and was one of the experiment's major supporters in its early years. The Brook Farm was based on a ranch in the countryside of present-day West Roxbury, Boston. Along with her sister-in-law Marianne Ripley, she oversaw Brook Farm's primary school using a progressive child-centered pedagogy that has been compared to the later reforms of John Dewey. When Brook Farm adapted itself into a Charles Fourier-inspired phalanstère, she did not share her husband's enthusiasm. Influenced in part by Orestes Brownson, she converted to Catholicism in 1846 and became a dedicated member of the church, leading her to spend much time on charitable projects such as serving on the board of a shelter for former sex workers; her husband never converted. Their relationship became strained by the 1850s. She died in 1861. Her home on Baker Street is a site on the Boston Women's Heritage Trail.
