= Sylvester Judd =

American novelist

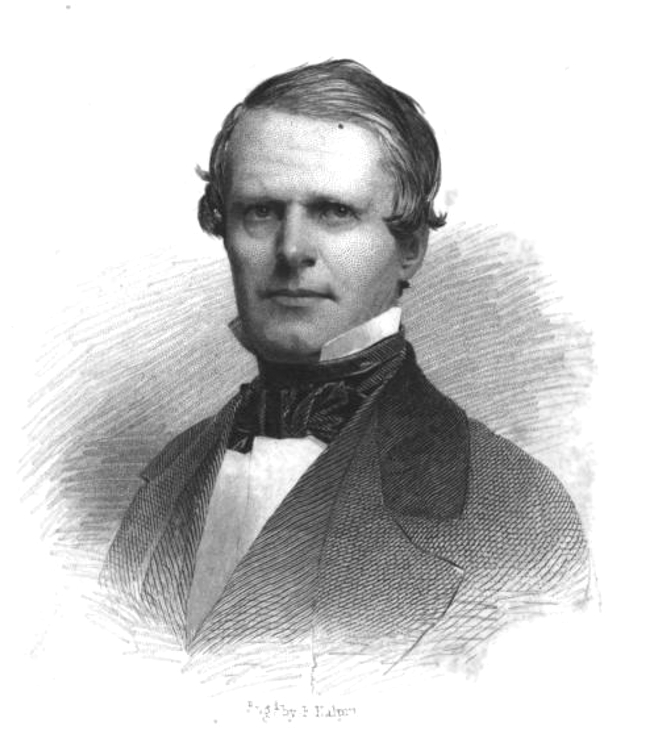
- Born: July 23, 1813; Westhampton, Massachusetts
- Died: January 26, 1853 (aged 39); Augusta, Maine
- Education: Hopkins Academy; Yale College; Harvard Divinity School
- Occupations: Minister, novelist
- Spouse: Jane Elizabeth Williams
- Children: 3

Sylvester Judd (July 23, 1813 – January 26, 1853) was a Unitarian minister and an American novelist.

== Biography ==
Sylvester Judd III was born on July 23, 1813, in Westhampton, Massachusetts to Sylvester Judd II and Apphia Hall, a daughter of Aaron Hall of Norwich, a veteran of the Revolutionary War, a one-year attendee at Harvard, and later modest justice of the peace. His great-grandfather was Rev. Jonathan Judd (1719-1803), a clergyman of Southampton, while his grandfather ran the family store. His father, after working in the store in his boyhood, went to Boston for several years, where, according to Judd's sister's biography, he became a voracious reader, returning to the family business, but then becoming editor of the Hampshire Gazette. Sylvester Judd III studied at Hopkins Academy in Hadley, Massachusetts, where he was president of the Literary Society and delivered the valedictorian address. He graduated from Yale College in 1836, and from Harvard Divinity School in 1840. His dissertation was entitled The Uses of Intellectual Philosophy to the Preacher. While a student, on April 4, 1838, Judd traveled to Concord, Massachusetts to meet Ralph Waldo Emerson after reading his essay "Epic Poetry". Emerson was pleased by Judd's interest in seeking a mystical identification with Christ. Judd may have been in the audience on August 31, 1837, and heard Emerson's commencement speech to the Phi Beta Kappa Society known as "The American Scholar".

Judd was ordained a Unitarian minister on October 1, 1840, becoming pastor of a church in Augusta, Maine. He was a member of the Maine Peace Society which was anti-war and sought justice through a World Court. Early in 1841, Judd met Jane Elizabeth Williams, the daughter of United States Senator Reuel Williams. The couple married on August 31, 1841; they had three daughters: Jane Elizabeth (September 26, 1844), Frances Hall (June 28, 1847), and Apphia Williams (March 16, 1853). Judd's third daughter was born two months after his death. His second daughter, Frances, married the Unitarian minister Seth Curtis Beach on November 17, 1869. Their son, Reuel W. Beach (Harvard graduate, married Ruth Walcott Stetson in 1909), and grandson, Curtis Beach, were both Unitarian ministers. Frances and Seth Beach's second son, Dr. Sylvester Judd Beach, lived from 1879-1953, residing in Portland, ME. Dr. Beach served as President of the Wayflete School in Portland, bringing progressive education to the school. Sylvester Judd's sister, Apphia Putnam Judd (born Oct 27, 1820 in Westhampton; died 1901 in Augusta), married his wife's brother, Joseph Hartwell Williams (1814-1896), who was the 27th governor of Maine (1857-1858).

== Influences ==
According to Philip Brockway, Judd's early influences were Calvinist puritanism. After a spiritual conversion to Unitarianism as a young man, his readings took on wide spheres, particularly while at Yale College and then Harvard Divinity School. His readings included the poetry of Jones Very, the writings of Thomas Carlyle, Johann Gottlieb Fichte, Robert Owen, Goethe's Wilhelm Meister's Apprenticeship, Goethe's Conversations with a Child by Bettina von Arnim, and the writings of the foremost Unitarian ministers of their day, William Ellery Channing and Ralph Waldo Emerson.

Brockway cites Emerson's journal entry from 1852, the year before Judd's death at 40: "I saw Judd in Augusta [Maine], in February, and asked him who his companions were. He said, 'Sunsets.' I told him I thought they needed men. He said, 'I'm a priest and converse with the sick and dying.'"

== Criticism ==
American critic and poet James Russell Lowell called Judd's novel Margaret "the most emphatically American book ever written". He mentioned the novel in his long satire A Fable for Critics (1848) as "the first Yankee book / With the soul of Down East in 't, and things farther East". In a 39-page review, however, critic William Bourne Oliver Peabody called the work unfinished and its characters and style inconsistent. After publishing his novel Philo, Judd sent a copy to Edward Everett Hale, who responded, "I think Philo glorious."

The critic and poet Richard J. Powers finds the child characterization of Margaret in the novel the prototype for Nathaniel Hawthorne's character of Pearl, Hester Prynne's daughter, in the 1850 novel The Scarlet Letter.

== Works ==
- 1836: "The Outlaw and His Daughter." Yale Literary Magazine. 1 (June 1836). 155-61.
- 1836: "What is Truth?" Yale Literary Magazine. 1 (June 1836). 129-31.
- 1838: "A Young Man's Account of his Conversion from Calvinism"
- 1842: "A Moral Review of the Revolutionary War, or Some of the Evils of the Event Considered: A Discourse Delivered at the Unitarian Church, Augusta, Sabbath Evening, March 13th, 1842; with an Introductory Address, and Notes." [third of Sunday evening lectures]Hallowell, MA: Glazier, Masters and Smith.
- 1845: "A Discourse Touching the Causes and Remedies of Intemperance." Sermon preached 2 February 1845. Augusta, ME: William T. Johnson, 1845.
- 1845: Margaret: A Tale of the Real and the Ideal, Blight and Bloom; Including Sketches of a Place Not Before Described, Called Mons Christi(revised 1851). Boston: Jordan and Wiley, 1845.
- 1850: Philo: An Evangeliad. Boston: Philips, Sampson, and Company, 1850.
- 1850: Richard Edney and the Governor's Family: A Rus-Urban Tale Simple and Popular, Yet Cultured and Noble of Morals, Sentiments, and Life Practically Treated and Pleasantly Illustrated, Containing Also Hints on Being Good and Doing Good. Boston: Philips, Sampson, 1850.
- 1850: "The True Dignity of Politics: A Sermon." Augusta, ME: William T. Johnson, 1850.
- 1850: "Heroism" (oration delivered 4 July)
- 1854: The Church, in a Series of Discourses (edited and with Preface written by Judd's sister's husband and wife's brother, Joseph Hartwell Williams). Boston: Crosby, Nichols, and Company, 111 Washington Street.
- The White Hills: An American Tragedy (a drama unpublished left in manuscript)

He also wrote a large number of sermons and religious addresses. Judd's papers are at the Harvard University Library, Yale University Library and Lithgow Library in Augusta. His father's papers are in the Forbes Library, Northampton, MA.
