= List of 19th-century women artists =

This is a partial list of 19th-century women artists, sorted alphabetically by decade of birth. These artists are known for creating artworks that are primarily visual in nature, in traditional media such as painting, sculpture, photography, printmaking, and ceramics.

The list covers artists born before 1870. For later births see List of 20th-century women artists. For earlier births, see List of 18th-century women artists.

== 1770–1799 ==
- Cassandra Austen (1773–1845), English watercolourist
- Ernesta Legnani Bisi (1788–1859), Italian painter and engraver
- Antoinette Louise Demarcy (1788–1859), French miniaturist
- Rose Emma Drummond (1790–1840), English miniature portraitist
- Marie-Élisabeth Laville-Leroux (1770–1826), French painter
- Elizabeth Liddell (1770–1831), British portraitist
- Amelia Long (1772–1837), British watercolourist
- Ema Saikō (1787–1861), Japanese painter and calligrapher
- Yun Zhu (1771–1833), Chinese painter

== 1800–1829 ==
- Sophie Anderson (1823–1903), painter
- Elisabetta Benato-Beltrami (1813–1888), Italian painter and sculptor
- Fulvia Bisi (1818–1911), Italian painter
- Margaret Rebecca Dickinson (1821–1918), British botanical artist
- Orsola Faccioli (1823–1906), Italian painter
- Emma Fürstenhoff (1802–1871), Swedish flower arranger
- Mina Karadžić (1828–1894), painter
- Katsushika Ōi (1800–1866), Japanese Ukiyo-e artist
- Louisa Keyser (Datsolalee) (c. 1829–1925), Washoe basket weaver
- Marianne Dwight Orvis (1816-1901), American watercolorist
- Fredrika Ramstedt (1829–1914), Swedish flower arranger
- Eloise Harriet Stannard (1829–1915), painter
- Emily Coppin Stannard (1803–1885), painter
- Theresa Walker (1807–1876), Australian sculptor
- Candace Wheeler (1827–1923), interior and textile designer

== 1830–1839 ==
- Susie M. Barstow (1836–1923), painter
- Jane E. Bartlett (1839–1923), painter and portraitist
- Julie Hart Beers (1835–1913), painter
- Fidelia Bridges (1834–1923), watercolorist
- Giulia Centurelli (1832–1872), Italian painter
- Frances C. Fairman (1839–1923), animal painter, illustrator
- Maria Magdalena Łubieńska (1833–1920), Polish painter and founder of an arts school.
- Jane Morgan (1832–1899), Irish painter and sculptor

== 1840–1849 ==
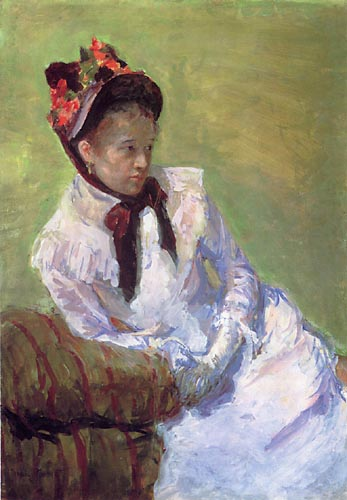
Mary Cassatt Self-portrait, c. 1878, gouache on paper, 23 5/8 × 16 3/16 in., Metropolitan Museum of Art, New York

- Quirina Alippi-Fabretti (1849–1919), Italian painter
- Helen Allingham (1848–1926), painter, illustrator
- Marie-Elmina Anger (1844–1901), nun and painter
- Anna Boch (1848–1936), painter
- Clelia Bompiani (1848–1927), Italian painter
- Marie Bracquemond (1841–1916), painter
- Caroline Shawk Brooks (1840–1913), American sculptor
- Mary Cassatt (1844–1926), painter, printmaker
- Helene Cramer (1844–1916), painter
- Eva Scott Fényes (1849–1930), painter
- Olga Fialka (1848–1930), painter, illustrator
- Jane Hawkins (1841–1904), portrait artist
- Kitty Lange Kielland (1843–1914), painter
- Clara Chipman Newton (1848–1936), china painter
- Lilla Cabot Perry (1848–1933), painter
- Vinnie Ream (1847–1914), sculptor
- Annie Swynnerton (1844–1933), painter
- Emma Beach Thayer (1849–1924), painter
- Margaret Thomas (1842–1929), Australian painter

== 1850–1859 ==
- Louise Abbéma (1858–1927), painter, printmaker, sculptor
- Anne Huntington Allen (1858–1946), painter
- Laura Alma-Tadema (1852–1909), painter
- Anna Ancher (1859–1935), Danish painter
- Lucy Angeline Bacon (1857–1932), painter
- Alice Pike Barney (1857–1931), painter
- Cecilia Beaux (1855–1942), painter
- Enella Benedict (1858–1942), American painter
- Susan Hinckley Bradley (1851–1929), American painter
- Molly Cramer (1852–1936), painter
- Annie I. Crawford (1856–1942), painter, printmaker
- Laura Ann Fry (1857–1943), ceramic painter
- Grace Woodbridge Geer (1854–1938), painter
- Anna Gerresheim (1852–1921), German painter
- Caroline Gotch (1854–1945), painter
- Laura Coombs Hills (1859–1952), painter
- Gertrude Käsebier (1852–1934), photographer
- Ida Pulis Lathrop (1859–1937), American painter
- Agnes Meyerhof (1856–1942), German painter
- Dora Louise Murdoch (1857–1933), painter
- Louisa Ellen Perman (1854–1921), Scottish floral painter
- Suze Robertson (1855–1922), painter
- Mary Crease Sears (1859 – 1938), bookbinder, cover designer
- Gertrude Spencer-Stanhope (1857–1944), sculptor, painter
- Marianne Stokes (1855–1927), painter
- Eva Stort (1855–1936), painter
- Austa Densmore Sturdevant (1855–1936), painter

== 1860–1869 ==
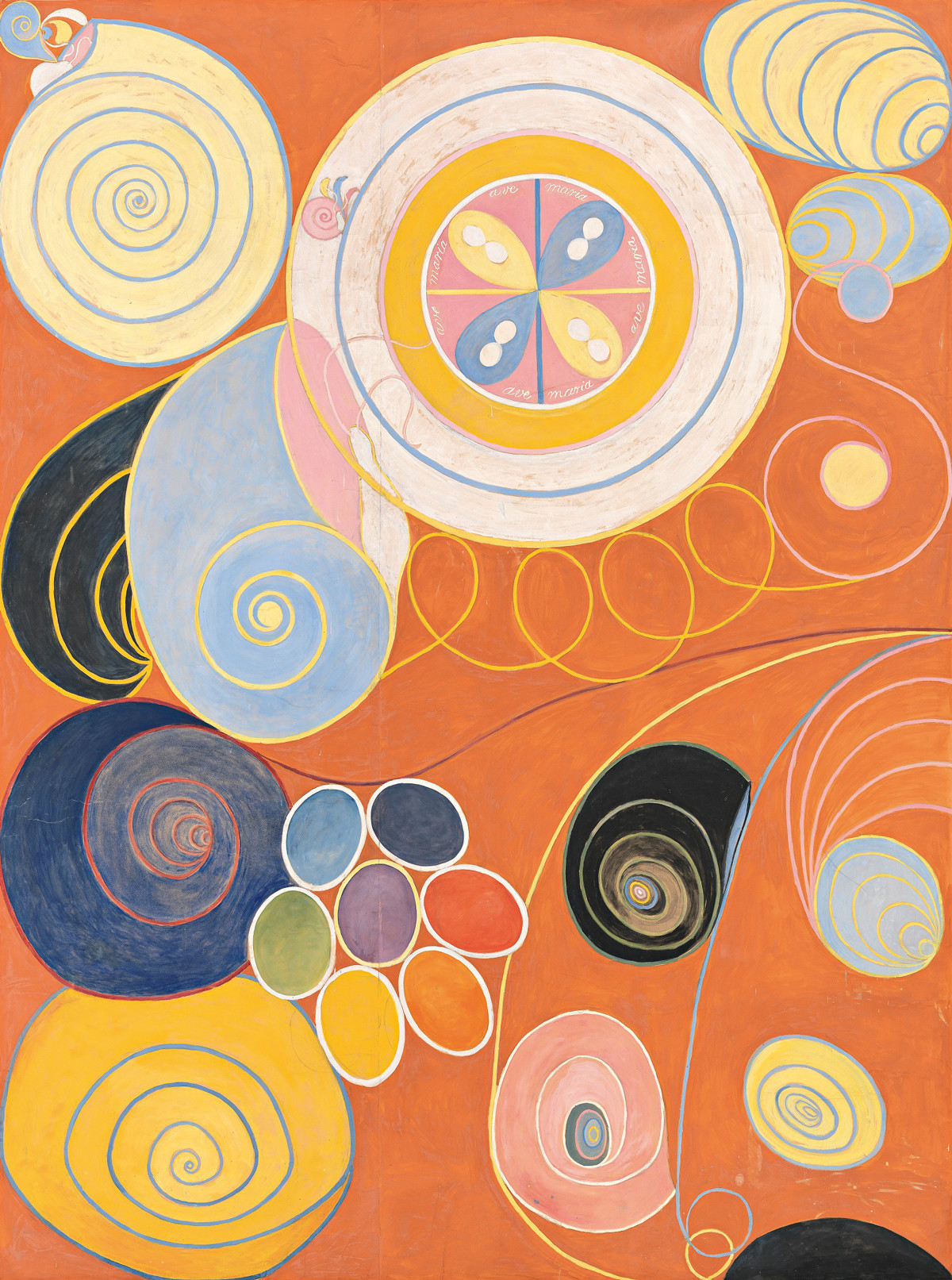
Hilma af Klint, The Ten Largest nr 3, Youth, Group 4, 1907

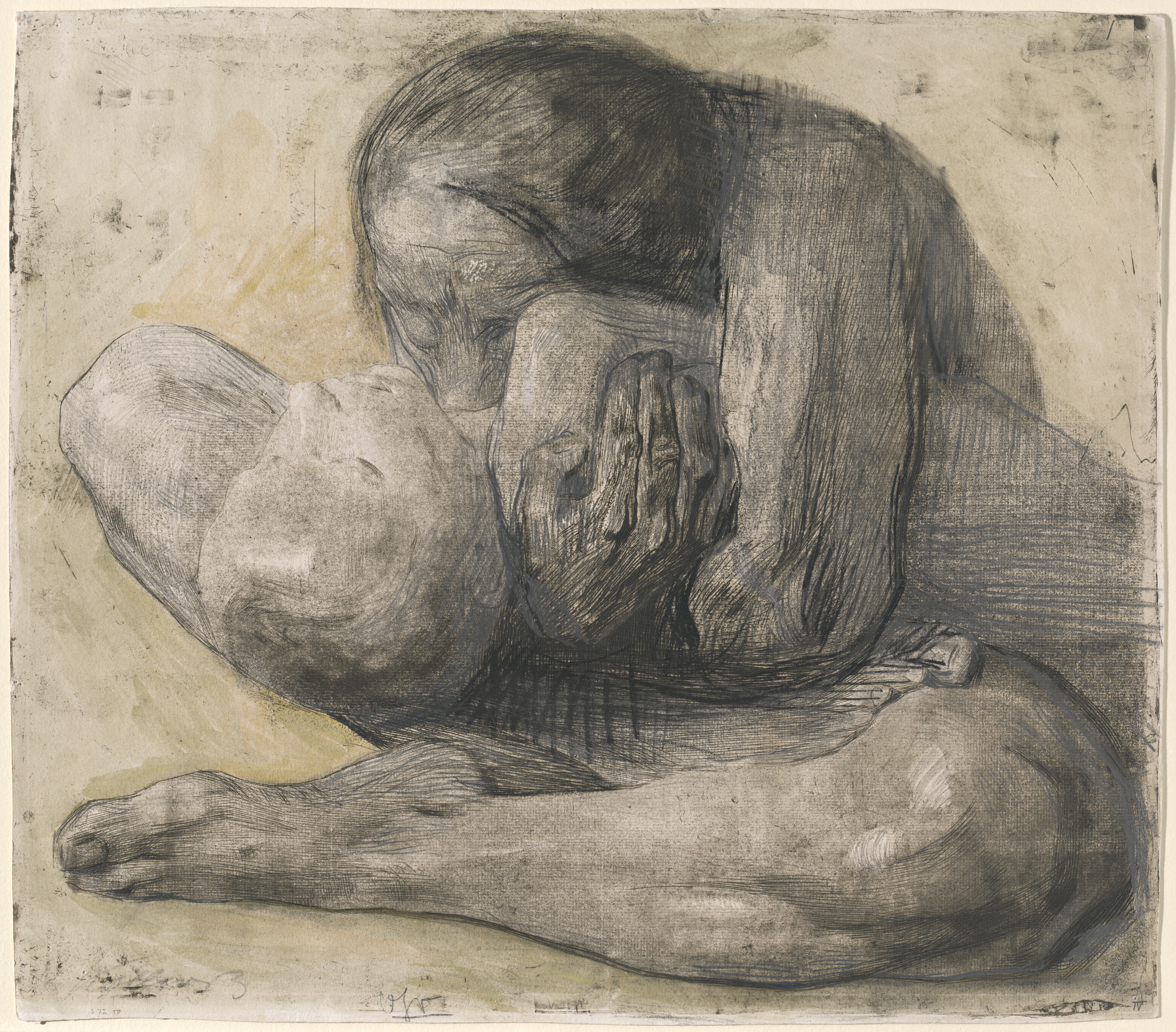
Käthe Kollwitz, Woman with Dead Child, 1903 etching

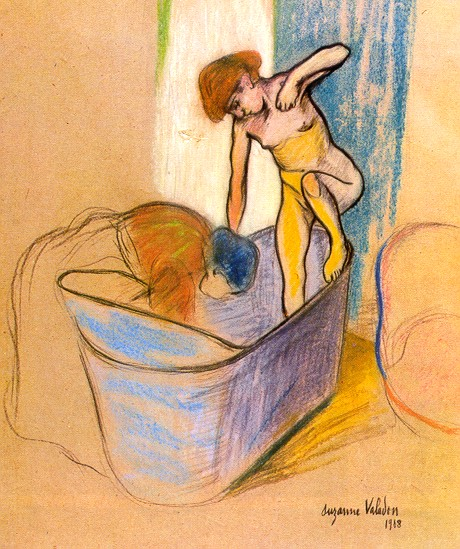
Suzanne Valadon, The Bath, 1908, pastel. 60×49 cm., Museum of Grenoble, France

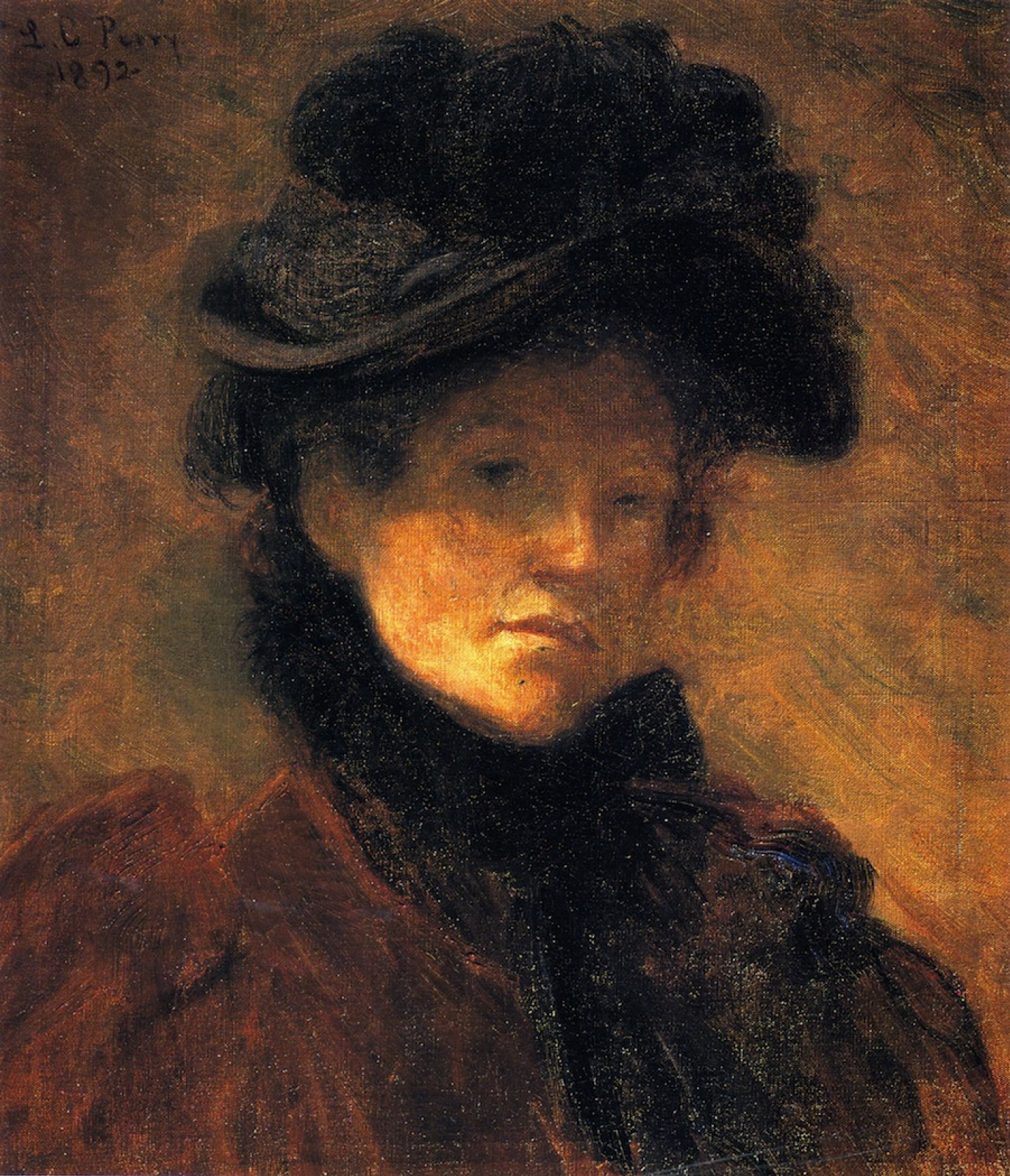
Lilla Cabot Perry, Self Portrait, 1892

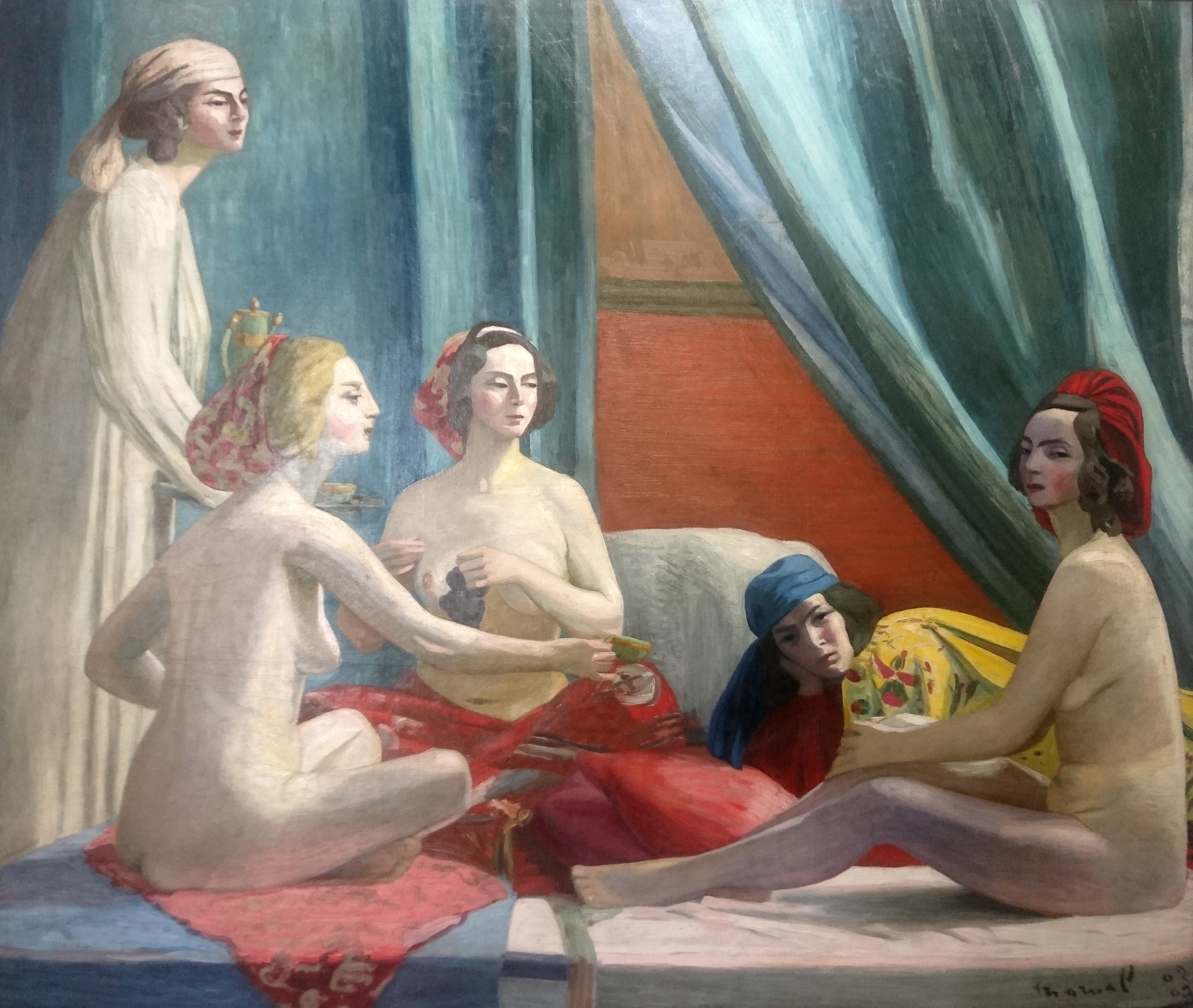
Jacqueline Marval, Les Odalisques, 1903

- Ester Almqvist (1869–1934), Swedish painter
- Helen Maitland Armstrong (1869–1948), stained glass artist
- Harriet Blackstone (1864–1939), figure painter
- Alice Boughton (c. 1866–1943), photographer
- Matilda Browne (1869–1947), American painter
- Elizabeth Eaton Burton (1869–1937), painter, printmaker, designer
- Sally Bush (1860–1946), photographer
- Evelyn Cameron (1868–1928), photographer
- Nellie Charlie (1867–1965), basket weaver
- Christabel Cockerell (1863–1951), painter
- Elizabeth Ethel Copeland (1866–1957), silversmith. enameler
- Kate Cory (1861–1958), painter, sculptor
- Alice Dannenberg (1861–1948), painter
- Jenny Eakin Delony (1866–1949), painter
- Lotus de Païni (1862–1953), Italian painter, writer, sculptor
- Cécile Douard (1866–1941), painter, sculptor
- Florence Dreyfous (1868–1950), painter
- Elisabeth von Eicken (1862–1940), German landscape painter
- Florence Esté (1860–1926), painter
- Johanna van Eybergen (1865–1950), applied artist and designer
- Norah Fulcher (1867–1945), portrait artist
- Frances Gearhart (1869–1959), printmaker and watercolorist
- Anne Goldthwaite (1869–1944), printmaker, painter
- Wilhelmina Douglas Hawley (1860–1958), painter
- Frances Hodgkins (1869–1947), painter
- Anna Hope (Nan) Hudson (1869–1957), painter
- Frances Benjamin Johnston (1864–1952), photographer
- Lee Lufkin Kaula (1865–1957), painter
- Marie de Ford Keller (1860–1962), painter
- Lucy Kemp-Welch (1869–1958), painter
- Kiyohara Tama (1861 – 1939), Japanese painter based in Italy
- Hilma af Klint (1862–1944), painter
- Käthe Kollwitz (1867–1945), printmaker, sculptor, painter
- Jessie Lipscomb (1861–1952), sculptor
- Séraphine Louis (1864–1942), painter
- Bessie MacNicol (1869–1904), painter
- Jacqueline Marval (1866–1932), French painter
- Cornelia F. Maury (1866–1942), American pastel artist
- Blanche Hoschedé Monet (1865–1947), painter
- Grandma Moses (1860–1961), painter
- Iris Nampeyo (c. 1860–1942), potter, ceramic artist
- Clara Weaver Parrish (1861–1925) painter, stained glass
- Edith Mitchill Prellwitz (1865–1944), painter
- Alice Blair Ring (1869–1947), painter
- Adelaïde Alsop Robineau (1865–1929), ceramic artist
- Marie Rosenthal-Hatschek (1869 – 1942), painter
- Helene Schjerfbeck (1862–1946), painter
- Anna Page Scott (1863–1925), painter
- Janet Scudder (1869–1940), sculptor
- Josephine Hartwell Shaw (1865–1941), jeweler, educator
- Annie Ware Sabine Siebert (1864–1947), painter
- Martha Simkins (1866–1969), painter
- Jessie Willcox Smith (1863–1935), painter, illustrator
- Josefine Swoboda (1861–1924), Austrian portrait painter
- Ellen Thesleff (1869–1954), painter
- Suzanne Valadon (1865–1938), painter
- Marianne von Werefkin (1860–1938), painter
- Anna Lillian Winegar (1867–1941), painter and illustrator

The list ends with artists born in 1869. For later births see List of 20th-century women artists.

== See also ==
- Women artists
- Lists of women artists
- List of women artists exhibited at the 1893 World's Columbian Exposition
