= Alippi =

Alippi is an Italian surname. Notable people with the surname include:

- Elías Isaac Alippi (1883–1942), Argentine actor
- Quirina Alippi-Fabretti (1849–1919), Italian painter
