= Fabretti =

Fabretti is an Italian surname. Notable people with the surname include:

- Ariodante Fabretti (1816–1894), Italian archaeologist
- Raffaello Fabretti (1618–1700), Italian antiquarian
- Lucrezia Fabretti (2001–), Italian lifesaver
- Quirina Alippi-Fabretti (1849–1919), Italian painter
