= The Blithedale Romance =

1852 novel by Nathaniel Hawthorne

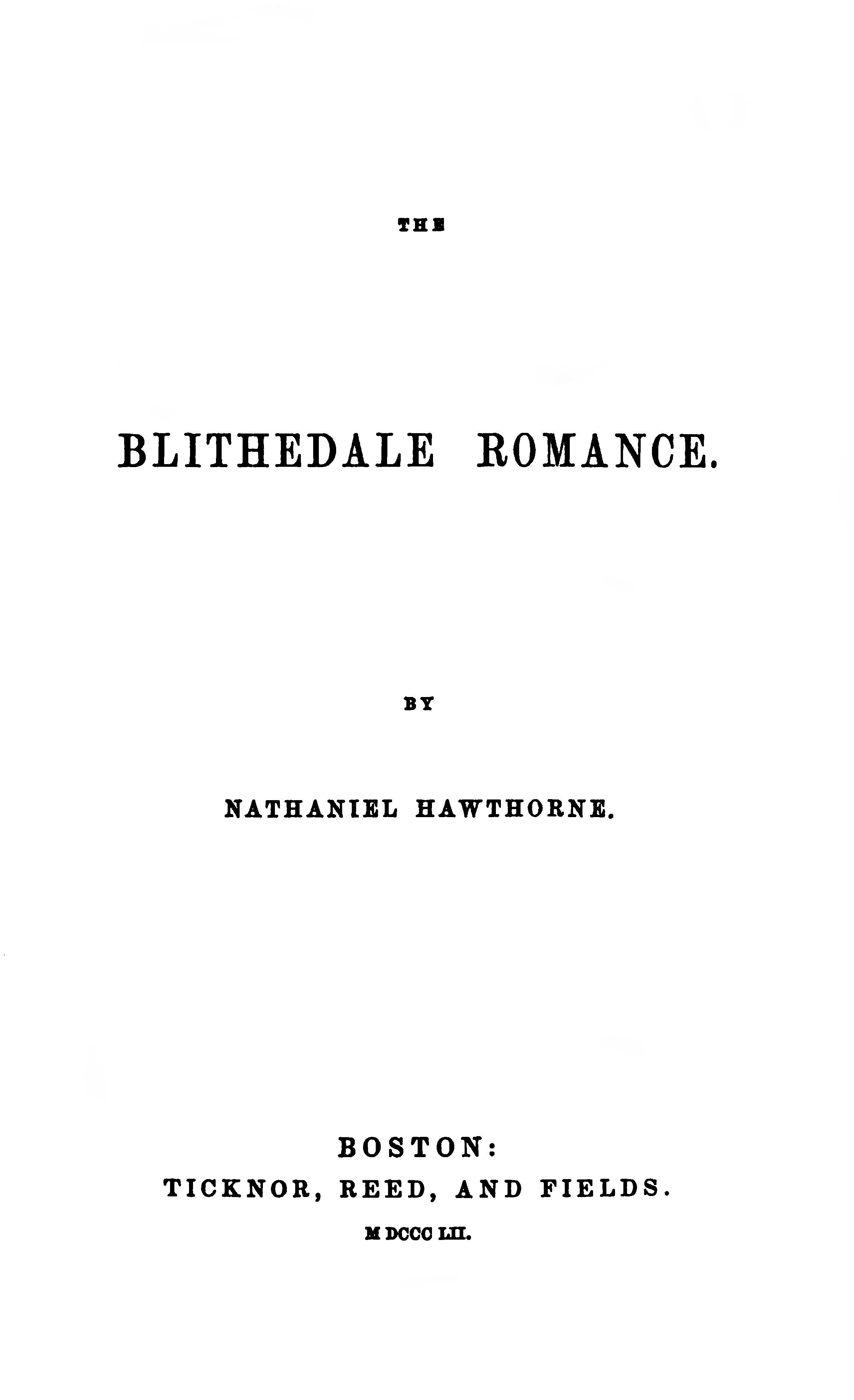
- First edition title page.
- Author: Nathaniel Hawthorne
- Genre: Romantic, Historical Fiction
- Publisher: Ticknor and Fields
- Publication date: 1852
- Pages: 287
- Text: The Blithedale Romance at Wikisource

The Blithedale Romance is a novel by American author Nathaniel Hawthorne published in 1852. It is the third major "romance", as he called the form. Its setting is a utopian socialist farming commune based on Brook Farm, of which Hawthorne was a founding member and where he lived in 1841. The novel dramatizes the conflict between the commune's ideals and the members' private desires and romantic rivalries.

== Plot summary ==
Before moving to the communist community of Blithedale in mid-1800s Massachusetts, poet Miles Coverdale is approached by Moodie (an apparent beggar) who asks for a favor. Though Coverdale is willing, Moodie eventually decides he will ask an older, more experienced man and departs. Miles leaves for Blithedale without his acquaintance Hollingsworth, who arrives later with Priscilla, a frail girl. They are welcomed by Mr. and Mrs. Silas Foster (a gruff, experienced farmer) and Zenobia, a charming woman who enchants Coverdale, Hollingsworth and Priscilla.

Coverdale becomes severely ill and is bedridden. During his sickness, he develops a closeness with Hollingsworth, who cares for him. Meanwhile, Hollingsworth also becomes close with Zenobia, and they plan to build a cottage together. Moodie approaches Coverdale in the fields one day and asks about Priscilla and Zenobia, but declines to see them when he hears they are good friends. During a walk, Coverdale encounters Westervelt, a man whom he immediately dislikes. Westervelt asks to see Zenobia, but only in a private way. Coverdale gives him some instruction but wonders about his motives. Coverdale later sees Westervelt walking with Zenobia and assumes them to be arguing about some past encounter.

Later, Zenobia theorizes that Priscilla, whose background is a mystery, may, in fact, be the Veiled Lady: a popular clairvoyant who recently stopped doing public shows. Afterwards, Coverdale, Hollingsworth, Zenobia and Priscilla meet at Eliot's Pulpit, a rock they habitually visit. There they discuss women's rights, and Zenobia sides with Hollingsworth (and against Coverdale) on a misogynistic point of view of women's roles. As they leave the Pulpit, Coverdale witnesses a moment of affection between Zenobia and Hollingsworth.

Coverdale and Hollingsworth's disagreements intensify the next day when they discuss their hopes for the future of Blithedale. Hollingsworth, who devoted himself to criminal rehabilitation, hopes to establish a facility for that purpose on the farm. When Hollingsworth indicates that Coverdale is either "with him or against him" in this effort, Coverdale refuses to assist him and ends their friendship. Coverdale decides to seek respite from the tumultuous relationships at the farm and leaves for the city.

In the city, Coverdale looks out from his hotel window into a boarding house and thinks he sees Priscilla; in another room, he sees Zenobia and Westervelt. They see him, so he goes to visit. Zenobia confirms that Priscilla is there, but Westervelt indicates that they must leave, and take Priscilla with them. Suspicious, Coverdale seeks out Moodie. Moodie explains that his name used to be Fauntleroy, and he was a wealthy man. His first daughter was Zenobia. He fell into financial ruin and left her to be raised by his still-wealthy uncle (who died, leaving her considerable wealth). Later, he married a pauper woman, and fathered Priscilla. Her unusual ways gained the attention of a "wizard," who had an odd relationship with her. Moodie got a message to Zenobia and entreated her to look out for Priscilla, but did not reveal that they were related.

Coverdale is shocked, proceeds to a show of the Veiled Lady, and recognizes Westervelt as the "wizard." Hollingsworth is also in the audience. When Coverdale asks Hollingsworth where Priscilla is, he goes up on stage, removes the veil and takes her away. The three return to Blithedale immediately; Coverdale returns later. Upon his return, he dreads seeing the three and takes a circuitous path through the trees. There he witnesses the community dressed as witches, fairies and other creatures; when he laughs, they chase him and he runs toward Eliot's Pulpit. There he finds his three companions; Zenobia indicates that he missed a "trial" conducted by Hollingsworth. She proceeds to accuse him of selfishness and heartlessness, and he angrily leaves with Priscilla, who follows him. Zenobia begins to weep.

When she recovers, she tells Coverdale that she will eventually get over it but will leave Blithedale. She says she will become a nun and asks Coverdale to tell Hollingsworth he "murdered" her. She leaves and Coverdale falls asleep under the rock. When he awakes at midnight, he proceeds to Hollingsworth's cottage and asks for his help; Silas Foster also wakes up and is asked to help. Leading them to a familiar spot by the river and reflecting on her words, Coverdale reveals he believes Zenobia drowned herself. Hollingsworth hooks her body with a pole; Silas Foster observes that he left a physical wound near her heart.

Years later, Coverdale has become listless in life. He visits Hollingsworth, who is a broken man and has not accomplished anything in the way of his dreams of rehabilitation. Priscilla remains by his side, and Coverdale realizes the weight of Zenobia's death ruined him. Coverdale had fallen in love with Priscilla and feels similarly hopeless.

== Major characters ==
Miles Coverdale: The story's protagonist and narrator, Coverdale is a simple observer of the activities of the Blithedale farm. However, his narrative occasionally exaggerates or becomes dreamlike and is not entirely trustworthy. At points in the novel, Coverdale seems to practice mild voyeurism. He is a professed supporter of women's equality, as evidenced in an argument with Hollingsworth, although he also views Zenobia's feminism as a symptom of romantic disillusionment. He is typically mild-mannered, though often strange and illogical. He is consistently curious about his surroundings, leading to his voyeurism and mostly unsupported speculations on his fellow residents. Though he seems to fancy Zenobia and certainly regards her as beautiful, in the last line of the story he confesses that he is truly in love with Priscilla. However, critics often identify a strongly homoerotic relationship between Coverdale and Hollingsworth.

Old Moodie: Though introduced as Old Moodie, he was formerly known as Fauntleroy, a wealthy but immoral man who loses his riches in a financial scandal. He is separated from his beautiful wife and daughter and disowned by the rest of his family. Years later, poorer and wiser, he remarries and has a second daughter. Coverdale uses him to discover the backgrounds of Zenobia and Priscilla, who are his two daughters.

The Veiled Lady: She is a mystical character, first introduced as a public curiosity, who suddenly disappears from the public's eye. Her story is developed in a type of ghost story narrated by Zenobia in a segment titled The Silvery Veil. She is said to have been held captive by the curse of the veil, a symbol that in Hawthorne's literature typically represents secret sin. She is controlled by the magician Westervelt and is eventually revealed to be Priscilla herself when Hollingsworth removes the veil.

Hollingsworth: A philanthropist overly concerned with his own ideals, he comes to the farm with Priscilla having been told she has a place there. He becomes good friends with Coverdale during the other's sickness, but his attempts to recruit the other to his cause eventually cause enough tension for a split in the friendship. He believes in the reform of all sinners and attempts to use Blithedale and its residents to achieve these ends, instead of those supported by the group. He is rumored to have a relationship with Zenobia partway through the novel, and they plan on building a cottage together. However, he falls for Priscilla, saving her from the fate of the Veiled Lady, and breaks up with Zenobia, which causes her to commit suicide.

Silas Foster: Coverdale describes him as "lank, stalwart, uncouth, and grizzly-bearded." He is the only resident who seems to be truly experienced in the art of farming. He is level-headed and sensible and is the first to suggest Priscilla stay upon her arrival. He is one of the three men to search for and find Zenobia's body and, while displaying proper sadness and emotion, also accepts her death with the most ease.

Mrs. Foster: Wife of Silas Foster.

Zenobia: Beautiful and wealthy, she wears a different tropical flower in her hair every day. She is admired by both Hollingsworth and Coverdale, though both eventually fall for her sister Priscilla instead. Priscilla herself is also quite taken with the older woman and follows her around the farm. Zenobia's main vice is pride, and she has an unusual and unexplained prior relationship with Professor Westervelt. By the end of the story, she is revealed to be (presumably) complicit in Westervelt's pseudo-slavery of Priscilla as the Veiled Lady, a scheme she uses to perpetuate her wealthy lifestyle, and a potential reason Hollingsworth leaves her. She is the daughter of Old Moodie's first, prosperous marriage when he was still referred to as Fauntleroy. She often is thought to be analogous to the author Margaret Fuller, who although not a resident of Brook Farm was a frequent visitor there.

Priscilla: A fragile, mysterious girl brought to the farm by Hollingsworth. She makes intricate purses that Coverdale considers a "symbol of her mystery." She is known to frequently pause as if responding to a call, though no other characters hear it. She becomes progressively more open and less frail throughout the novel and develops a strong attachment to Hollingsworth on top of her sisterly affection for Zenobia. She is eventually revealed to be the second daughter of Old Moodie, as well as the alter ego of the Veiled Lady. Hollingsworth frees her from the curse of the veil, and at the book's close, she remains attached to him.

Professor Westervelt: Stumbles into the plot looking for Priscilla and Zenobia. Coverdale takes an immediate distaste for him and describes him with such language as one would describe the devil. In fact, much of the imagery Coverdale uses, such as the flames on Westervelt's pin and the serpent-headed staff he carries are direct references to Satan. He presumably has a former, possibly romantic, relationship with Zenobia. He is revealed to be the magician controlling Priscilla near the end of the book, and his last appearance is at Zenobia's funeral where he criticizes her foolish suicide.

== Narrative style ==
The novel is written from a first-person limited point of view and the narrator is Miles Coverdale. Coverdale's narrative style is erratic and dreamlike, bringing a strange form of syntax to the novel that is more Coverdale's than Hawthorne's. In a final chapter added after the original manuscript was completed but before publishing, Coverdale breaks the fourth wall and reveals that the writing takes place significantly after leaving Blithedale. He reveals the fates of the other characters from a still limited viewpoint.

== Symbolism ==
- Flower: Zenobia wears a new exotic flower every day. It represents vitality, and all the other characters are focused on destroying it. Coverdale is always probing and investigating her life. Hollingsworth uses her in his conspiracy to create an ideal society. Priscilla betrays her when she chooses Hollingsworth over her. Lastly, Westervelt blackmails her. She ultimately destroys herself through suicide. The exotic flower is a symbol of her pride, life and vitality all of which the characters in the Blithedale Romance are set on destroying. Zenobia's main vice is pride; however, it is why she is admired by all. Its physical representation is demonstrated through her exotic flower.
- Veil: The veil represents withdrawal and concealment. Priscilla, as the Veiled Lady, is private and hidden. The image of the veil appears with almost every character. Old Moodie with his alias and eye patch illustrates his use of concealment. Westervelt's gold teeth, and Hollingsworth's philanthropic project are also examples of a withdrawal. Additionally, the whole community is withdrawn from society, as it is a secluded Utopian community. The veil is a constantly recurring theme throughout the novel. Concealment and withdrawal continually surface through all the characters.
- Spring/Fall: The novel starts in spring and ends in fall. Upon moving to Blithedale, Coverdale proclaims his own rebirth. Spring is full of warmth and hope, while fall is full of dark imagery. In spring, Coverdale recovers from his illness. In the fall, it concludes with the mutilated, marbled, rigid corpse of Zenobia.
- Sickness: At the beginning of the novel, Coverdale becomes deathly ill and is bedridden. Hollingsworth cares for him and he returns to health. Priscilla is also sick and gradually regains her health as time elapses and she adjusts to Blithedale. As Roy R. Male Jr. wrote, "This sickness is what the book is about." Coverdale's mental state also changes throughout the novel. Upon his return, he emphasizes that there is a "Sickness of the spirits [which] kept alternating with my flights of causeless buoyancy."
- Dreams: The dream of building a Utopian Society is just one of the dreams in the novel. As Daniel Hoffman wrote, "Whether Miles Coverdale is reporting what he has actually seen and heard, or what he has dreamed. Parts of the book indeed seem to rely on, to create, a stream-of-consciousness narration" Coverdale's dreams reveal his discovery and continued repression of his sexual desire of Zenobia. There are dreams created in his imagination and memory, as well as the dreams in his sleep. All of which include the veil and mask imagery that recur in the novel.

== Development and publication history ==
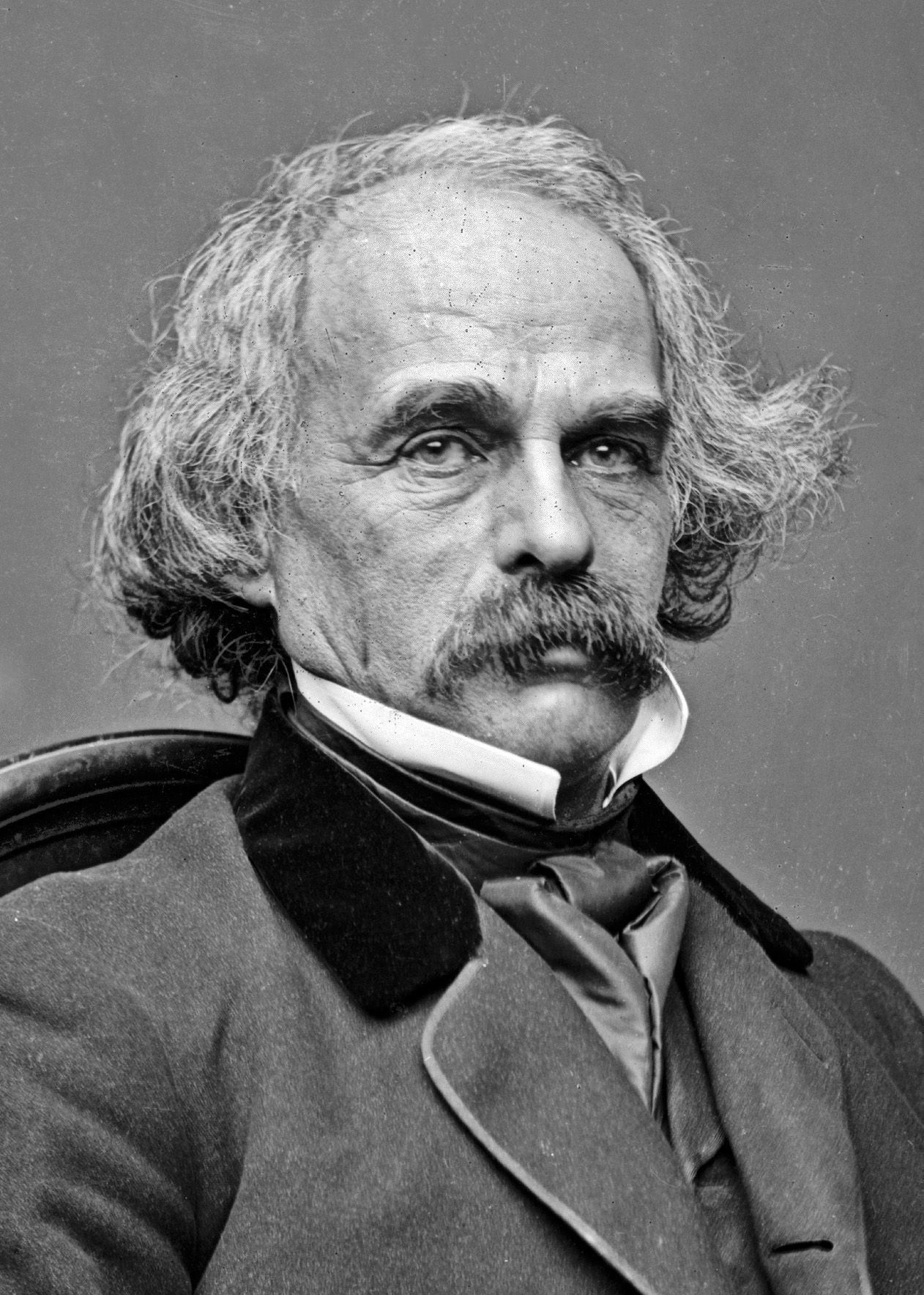
Nathaniel Hawthorne in the 1860s

The Blithedale Romance is a work of fiction based on Hawthorne's recollections of Brook Farm, a short-lived agricultural and educational commune where Hawthorne lived from April to November 1841. The commune, an attempt at an intellectual utopian society, interested many famous Transcendentalists such as Ralph Waldo Emerson and Margaret Fuller, though few of the Transcendentalists actually lived there. In the novel's preface, Hawthorne describes his memories of this temporary home as "essentially a daydream, and yet a fact" which he employs as "an available foothold between fiction and reality." His feelings of affectionate scepticism toward the commune are reflected not only in the novel but also in his journal entries and in the numerous letters he wrote from Brook Farm to Sophia Peabody, his future wife.

Hawthorne's claim that the novel's characters are "entirely fictitious" has been widely questioned. The character of Zenobia, for example, is said to have been modelled upon Margaret Fuller, an acquaintance of Hawthorne and a frequent guest at Brook Farm. The circumstances of Zenobia's death, however, were not inspired by the shipwreck that ended Fuller's life but by the suicide of a certain Miss Martha Hunt, a refined but melancholy young woman who drowned herself in a river on the morning of July 9, 1845. Hawthorne helped to search for the body that night and later recorded the incident at considerable length in his journal. Suggested prototypes for Hollingsworth include Amos Bronson Alcott, Ralph Waldo Emerson, and Horace Mann, while the narrator is often supposed to be Hawthorne himself.

== Literary significance and reception ==
Following its publication, The Blithedale Romance was received with little enthusiasm by contemporary critics. As one reviewer claims, the preface which is merely a disclaimer of sorts, "is by no means the least important part of it". In fact, to many reviewers this simple, non-fictional disclaimer seems to be the most important part of the book. Many reviews refer to the preface of the novel and express skepticism in regard to Hawthorne's plea contained therein for the reader not to take the characters and occurrences of the novel as representative of real-life people and events. They claim that there is simply too much correlation between fiction and nonfiction. One reviewer states "So vividly does [Hawthorne] present to us the scheme at Brook Farm, to which some of our acquaintance were parties, so sharply and accurately does he portray some incidents of life there, that we are irresistibly impelled to fix the real names of men and women to the characters of his book". As such they read into what Hawthorne writes about characters that have associated real-life figures.

However, other reviews, while stating that there is a correlation between the fiction of the novel and reality, but these correlations should not lead to an association of fiction and non-fiction. One review states "We can recognize in the personages of his Romance individual traits of several real characters who were [at Brook Farm], but no one has his or her whole counterpart in one who was actually a member of the community. There was no actual Zenobia, Hollingsworth, or Priscilla there, and no such catastrophe as described ever occurred there".

In Hawthorne (1879), Henry James called it "the lightest, the brightest, the liveliest" of Hawthorne's "unhumorous fictions", while literary critic Richard Brodhead has described it as "the darkest of Hawthorne's novels."

A lot of modern criticism centers around the relationship between fiction and non-fiction as well. Critics believe that when viewed as representative of Hawthorne's own life and beliefs, The Blithedale Romance provides insight into the mind of the author. According to critics, the novel can be seen as a reflection of the religious conflict Hawthorne faced throughout his life. Irving Howe summarizes this religious conflict, stating, "Throughout his life, Hawthorne was caught up in what we would call a crisis of religious belief. His acute moral sense had been largely detached from the traditional context of the orthodox faith, but it had found little else in which to thrive". Although Hawthorne did not agree with Puritan dogmas, Transcendentalists often associated morality with the observance of these dogmas. The novel presents an ironic contradiction between the perception of morality and actual morality, such as the "Utopian" Blithedale filled with sin and far less than "moral" individuals. Critics claim, therefore that Blithedale is an attempt by Hawthorne to represent morality as independent from faith.

In a broader sense, critics have long argued that the majority of the people, places, and events of The Blithedale Romance can be traced back to Hawthorne's observations and experiences over his lifetime. The most obvious of these correlations between fiction and reality is the similarity between Blithedale and Brook Farm, an actual experimental community in the 19th century of which Hawthorne was a part. In addition, the character of Coverdale is often associated with Hawthorne himself. However, according to critics, this self-portrait is "a highly and mocking self-portrait, as if Hawthorne were trying to isolate and thereby exorcise everything within him that impedes full participation in life". Critics have also argued for less obvious connections such as the connection between Zenobia and Margaret Fuller, a contemporary of Hawthorne.
