= Brook Farm =

1840s community in West Roxbury, Massachusetts

- U.S. National Register of Historic Places
- U.S. National Historic Landmark
- Boston Landmark
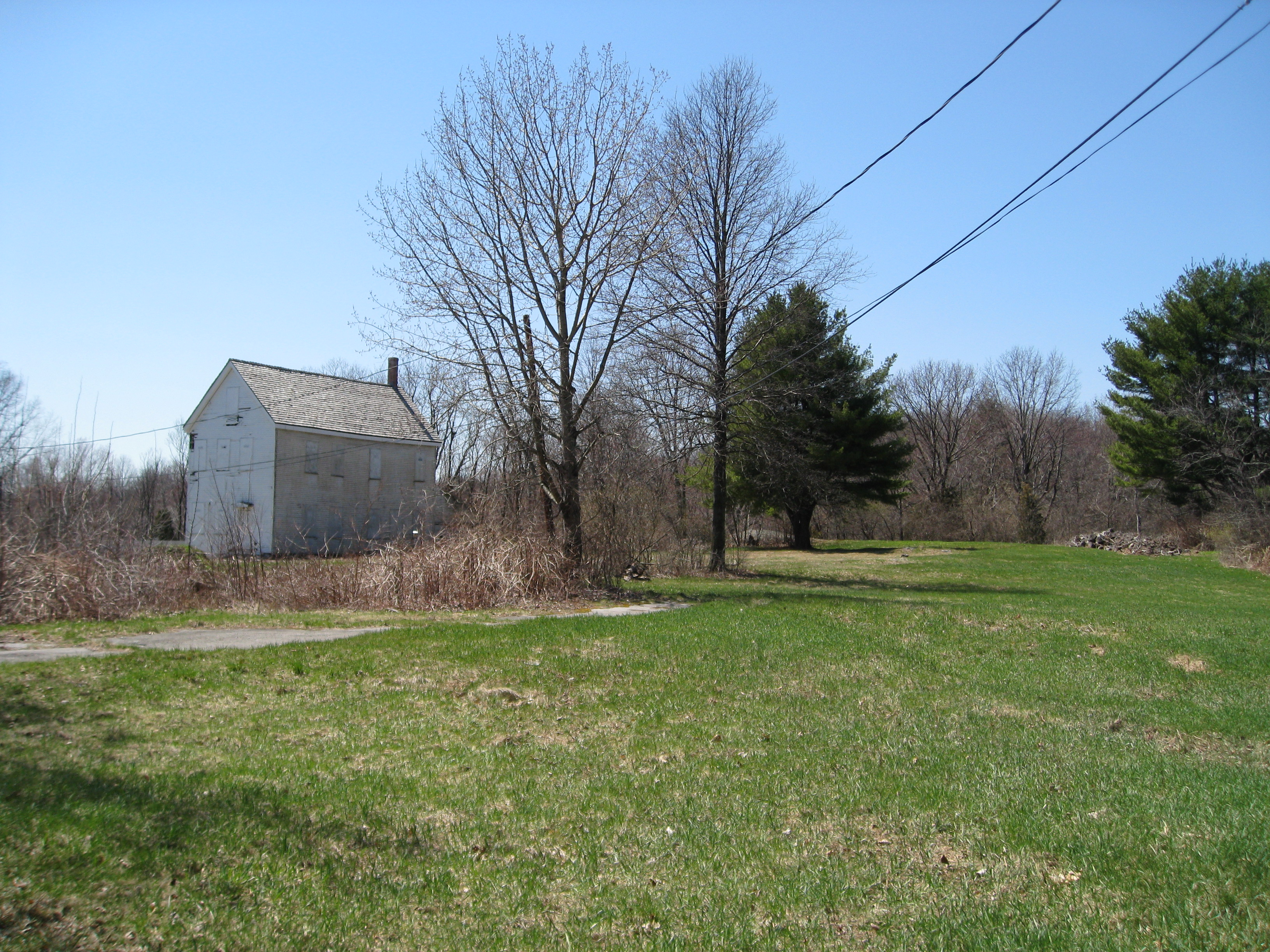

- Location within Greater Boston area Location within Massachusetts Location within the United States
- Interactive map of Brook Farm
- Location: 670 Baker Street, Boston, Massachusetts
- Coordinates: 42°17′28.90″N 71°10′26.71″W
- Area: 188 acres (0.76 km^{2})
- Built: 1841
- Architect: Brook Farm Community
- NRHP reference No.: 66000141

Significant dates
- Added to NRHP: October 15, 1966
- Designated NHL: July 23, 1965
- Designated BOSL: October 25, 1977

Brook Farm, also called the Brook Farm Institute of Agriculture and Education or the Brook Farm Association for Industry and Education, was a utopian experiment in communal living in the United States in the 1840s. It was founded by former Unitarian minister George Ripley and his wife Sophia Ripley at the Ellis Farm in West Roxbury, Massachusetts (nine miles outside of downtown Boston), in 1841 and was inspired in part by the ideals of transcendentalism, a religious and cultural philosophy based in New England. Founded as a joint stock company, it promised its participants a portion of the farm's profits in exchange for an equal share of the work. Brook Farmers believed that by sharing the workload, they would have ample time for leisure and intellectual pursuits.

Life on Brook Farm was based on balancing labor and leisure while working together for the community's benefit. Each member could choose whatever work they found most appealing and all were paid equally, including women. Revenue came from farming and from selling handmade products like clothing, as well as fees paid by the farm's many visitors. The main source of income was the school, which was overseen by Mrs. Ripley. A preschool, primary school, and a college preparatory school attracted children internationally and each child was charged for an education. Adult education was also offered.

The community was never financially stable and had difficulty profiting from its agricultural pursuits. By 1844, the Brook Farmers adopted a societal model based on the socialist concepts of Charles Fourier and began publishing The Harbinger as an unofficial journal promoting Fourierism. Following his vision, the community began building an ambitious structure called the Phalanstery. When the uninsured building burned down, the community was financially devastated and never recovered. It was fully closed by 1847. Despite the commune's failure, many Brook Farmers looked back on their experience favorably. The commune's critics included Charles Lane, founder of another utopian community, Fruitlands. Nathaniel Hawthorne was a founding member of Brook Farm, though not a strong adherent of the community's ideals. He later fictionalized his experience in his novel The Blithedale Romance (1852).

After Brook Farm closed, the property was operated for most of the next 130 years by a Lutheran organization, first as an orphanage, and then a treatment center and school. Fire destroyed the Transcendentalists' buildings over the years. In 1988, the State of Massachusetts acquired 148 acres (60 ha) of the farm, which is now operated by the Massachusetts Department of Conservation and Recreation as a historic site. Brook Farm was one of Massachusetts's first sites to be listed on the National Register of Historic Places and be designated a National Historic Landmark. In 1977, the Boston Landmarks Commission designated Brook Farm a Boston Landmark, the city's highest recognition for historic sites.

== History ==
=== Planning and background ===
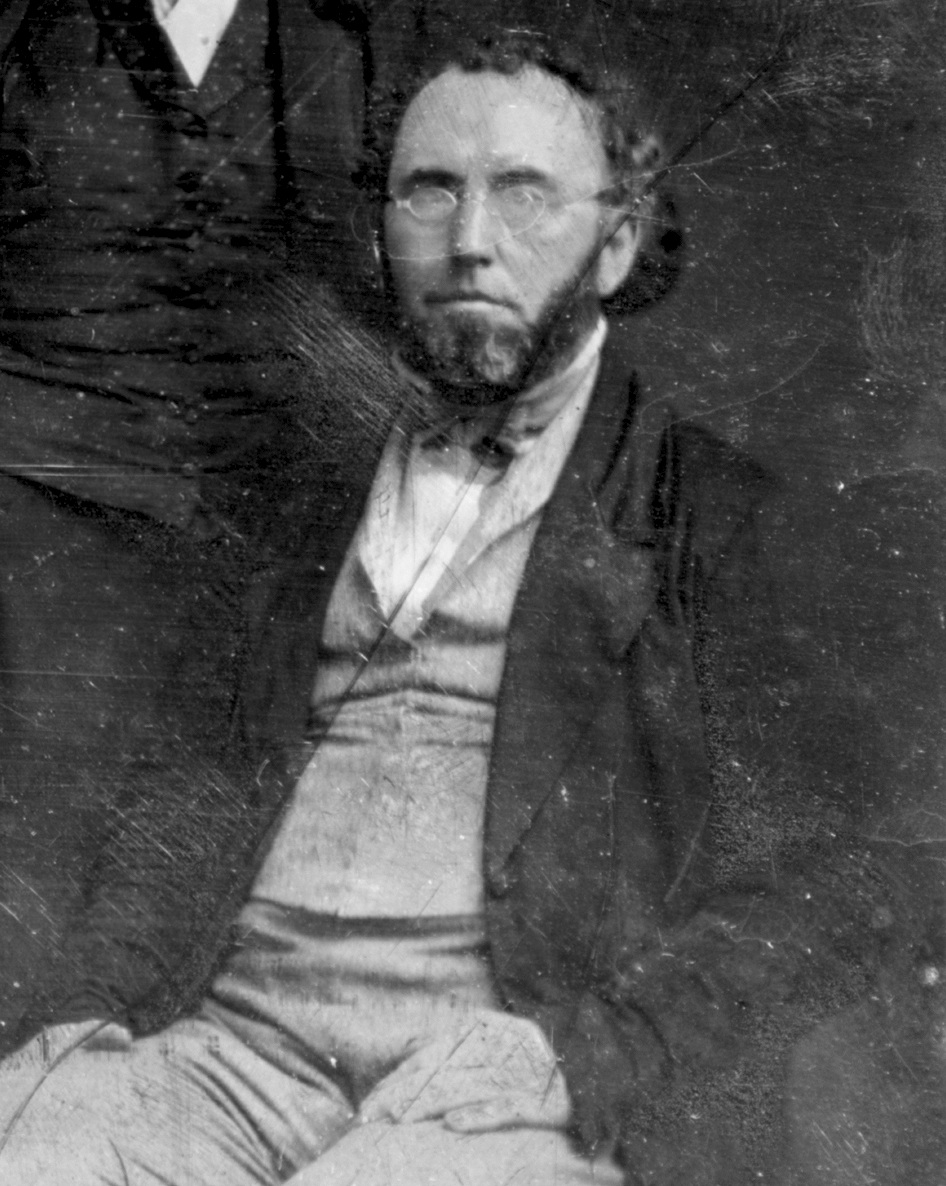
George Ripley founded Brook Farm based on Transcendental ideals.

In October 1840, George Ripley announced to the Transcendental Club that he was planning to form a Utopian community. Brook Farm, as it would be called, was based on the ideals of Transcendentalism; its founders believed that by pooling labor they could sustain the community and still have time for literary and scientific pursuits. The experiment was meant to serve as an example for the rest of the world, based on the principles of "industry without drudgery, and true equality without its vulgarity". At Brook Farm, as in other communities, physical labor was perceived as a condition of mental well-being and health. Brook Farm was one of at least 80 communal experiments active in the United States in the 1840s, though it was the first to be secular. Ripley believed his experiment would be a model for the rest of society. He predicted: "If wisely executed, it will be a light over this country and this age. If not the sunrise, it will be the morning star." As more interested people began to take part in planning, Ripley relocated meetings from his home to the West Street bookshop operated by Elizabeth Palmer Peabody.

=== Beginnings ===
Ripley and his wife Sophia formed a joint stock company in 1841 along with 10 other investors. He sold shares of the company for $500 with a promise of 5% of the profits to each investor. Shareholders were also allowed a single vote in decision-making and several held director positions. The Ripleys chose to begin their experiment at a dairy farm owned by Charles and Maria Mayo Ellis in West Roxbury, Massachusetts, near the home of Theodore Parker. They began raising money, including holding a meeting at Peabody's bookshop to raise $10,000 for the farm's purchase. The site was eventually purchased on October 11, 1841, for $10,500, though participants began moving in as early as April. The 170-acre (0.69 km^{2}) farm about eight miles (13 km) from Boston was described in a pamphlet as a "place of great natural beauty, combining a convenient nearness to the city with a degree of retirement and freedom from unfavorable influences unusual even in the country". The purchase also covered a neighboring Keith farm, about 22 acres (89,000 m^{2}), "consisting altogether of a farm with dwelling house, barn, and outbuildings thereon situated".

The first major public notice of the community was published in August 1841. "The Community at West Roxbury, Mass." was likely written by Elizabeth Palmer Peabody. Though they began with 10 investors, eventually 32 people became Brook Farmers. Writer and editor Margaret Fuller was invited to Brook Farm and, though she never officially joined the community, was a frequent visitor, often spending New Year's Eve there. Ripley received many applications to join the community, especially from people who had little money or were in poor health, but full-fledged membership was granted only to those who could afford a $500 share of the joint stock company.

One of Brook Farm's founders was author Nathaniel Hawthorne. Hawthorne did not particularly agree with the experiment's ideals, hoping only that it would help him raise enough money to begin his life with his wife-to-be, Sophia Peabody. She considered moving there as well and even visited in May 1841, though Hawthorne sent her away. Ripley was aware of Hawthorne's motivations, and tried to convince him to get involved more fully by appointing him as one of four trustees, specifically overseeing "Direction of Finance". After requesting his initial investment returned, Hawthorne resigned from Brook Farm on October 17, 1842. He wrote of his displeasure with the community: "even my Custom House experience was not such a thraldom and weariness; my mind and heart were freer ...Thank God, my soul is not utterly buried under a dung-heap."

=== Fourier inspiration ===
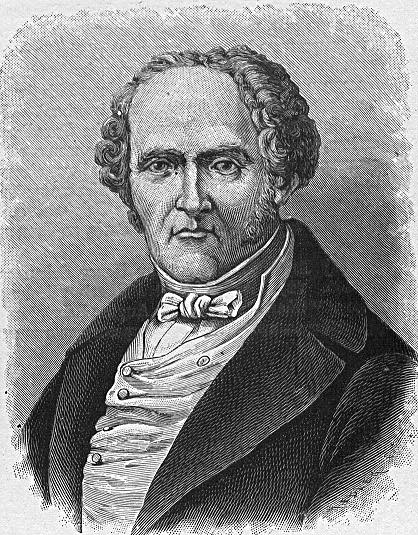
Brook Farm was reorganized to follow the work of Charles Fourier.

In the late 1830s, Ripley became increasingly engaged in "Associationism", an early socialist movement based on the work of Charles Fourier. Horace Greeley, a New York newspaper editor, and others began to pressure Brook Farm to follow more closely the pattern of Fourier at a time when the community was struggling to be self-sufficient. Albert Brisbane, whose book The Social Destiny of Man (1840) had inspired Ripley, paid Greeley $500 for permission to publish a front-page column in the New York Tribune that ran in several parts from March 1842 to September 1843. Brisbane argued in the series, titled "Association: or, Principles of a True Organization of Society", that Fourier's theories could be applied in the United States. He published similar articles in 1842 in The Dial, the journal of the Transcendentalists. Fourier's societal vision included elaborate plans for specific structures and highly organized roles for its members. He called his system for an ideal community a "Phalanx".

To meet this vision, now under the name "Brook Farm Association for Industry and Education", Brook Farmers committed themselves to constructing an ambitious communal building known as the Phalanstery. Construction began in the summer of 1844. The structure would accommodate 14 families and single people as well. It was planned to be 175 by 40 feet (53 by 12 m) and include, as Ripley wrote, "a large and commodious kitchen, a dining-hall capable of seating from three to four hundred persons, two public saloons, and a spacious hall or lecture room".

Ripley and two associates created a new constitution for Brook Farm in 1844, beginning the experiment's attempts to follow Fourier's Phalanx system. Many Brook Farmers supported the transition; at a dinner in honor of Fourier's birthday, one member of the group proposed a toast to "Fourier, the second coming of Christ". Others did not share that enthusiasm, and some left the commune. One of those who left was Isaac Hecker, who converted to Catholicism and went on to become the founder of the first American-based order of priests, the Paulist Fathers, in 1858. In particular, many Brook Farmers thought the new model was too rigid and structured and too different from the carefree aspects that had attracted them. Both supporters and detractors called the early part of Brook Farm's history the "Transcendental days". Ripley himself became a celebrity proponent of Fourierism and organized conventions throughout New England to discuss the community.

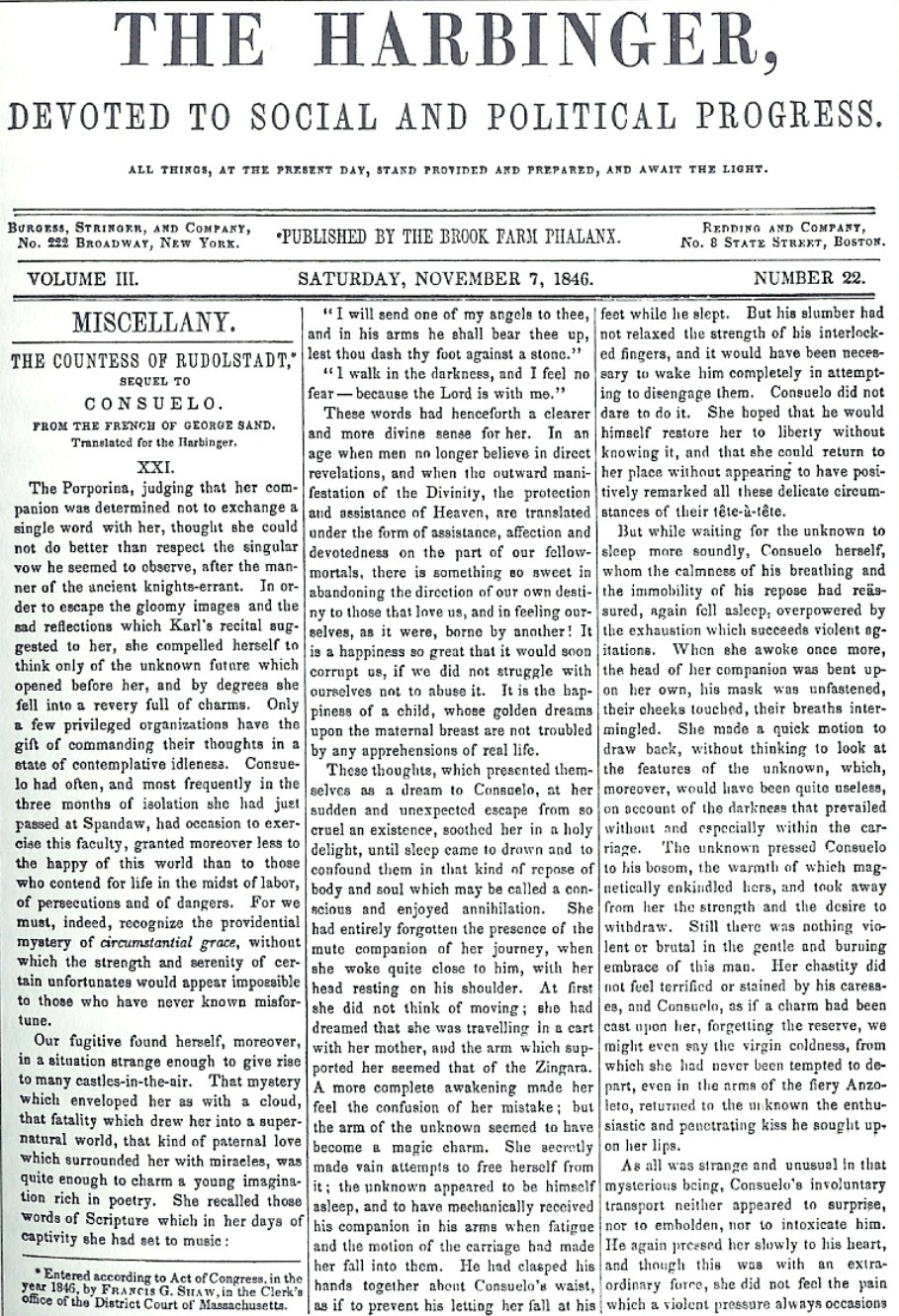
November 7, 1846, issue of The Harbinger, printed at Brook Farm

In the last few months of 1844, Brook Farmers were offered the chance to take over two Associationism-inspired publications, Brisbane's The Phalanx and John Allen's The Social Reformer. Four printers were part of Brook Farm at the time and members of the community believed it would elevate their status as leaders of the movement, as well as provide additional income. Ultimately, the Brook Farmers published a new journal combining the two, The Harbinger. The journal's first issue was published on June 14, 1845, and it was continuously printed, originally weekly, until October 1847, when it relocated to New York City, still under the oversight of Ripley and fellow Brook Farmer Charles Anderson Dana. Naming the publication turned out to be a difficult task. Parke Godwin offered advice when it was suggested to keep the name The Phalanx:

Call it the Pilot, the Harbinger, the Halycon, the Harmonist, The Worker, the Architect, The Zodiac, The Pleiad, the Iris, the Examiner, The Aurora, the Crown, the Imperial, the Independent, the Synthesist, the Light, the Truth, the Hope, the Teacher, the Reconciler, the Wedge, the Pirate, the Seer, the Indicator, the Tailor, the Babe in the Manger, the Universe, the Apocalypse, the Red Dragon, the Plant, Beelzebub—the Devil or anything rather than the meaningless name Phalanx.

=== Decline and dissolution ===
Brook Farm began to decline rapidly after its restructuring. In October 1844, Orestes Brownson visited the site and sensed that "the atmosphere of the place is horrible". To save money, "retrenchments", or sacrifices, were called for, particularly at the dinner table. Meat, coffee, tea, and butter were no longer offered, though it was agreed that a separate table with meat be allowed in December 1844. That Thanksgiving, a neighbor donated a turkey. Many Brook Farmers applied for exceptions to these rules and soon it was agreed that "members of the Association who sit at the meat table shall be charged extra for their board". Life on Brook Farm was further worsened by an outbreak of smallpox in November 1845; though no one died, 26 Brook Farmers were infected. Ripley attempted to quell the financial difficulties by negotiating with creditors and stockholders, who agreed to cancel $7,000 of debt.

Construction on the Phalanstery progressed well until March 3, 1846, when it was discovered that it had caught fire. Within two hours, the structure had completely burned down; firefighters from Boston arrived too late. The fire was likely caused by a defective chimney. One participant noted, "Ere long the flames were chasing one another in a mad riot over the structure; running across long corridors and up and down the supporting columns of wood, until the huge edifice was a mass of firework". The financial blow from the loss of the uninsured building was $7,000 and it marked the beginning of the end of Brook Farm.

Ripley, who had begun the experiment, made an unofficial break with Brook Farm in May 1846. Many others began to leave as well, though the farm's dissolution was slow. As one Brook Farmer said, the community's slow decline was like apple petals drifting slowly to the ground, making it seem "dreamy and unreal". On November 5, 1846, Ripley's book collection, which had served as Brook Farm's library, was auctioned to help cover the association's debts. By the end, Brook Farm had a total debt of $17,445. Ripley told a friend, "I can now understand how a man would feel if he could attend his own funeral". He took a job with the New York Tribune and it took him 13 years to repay Brook Farm's debt, which he did in 1862.

== After Brook Farm ==
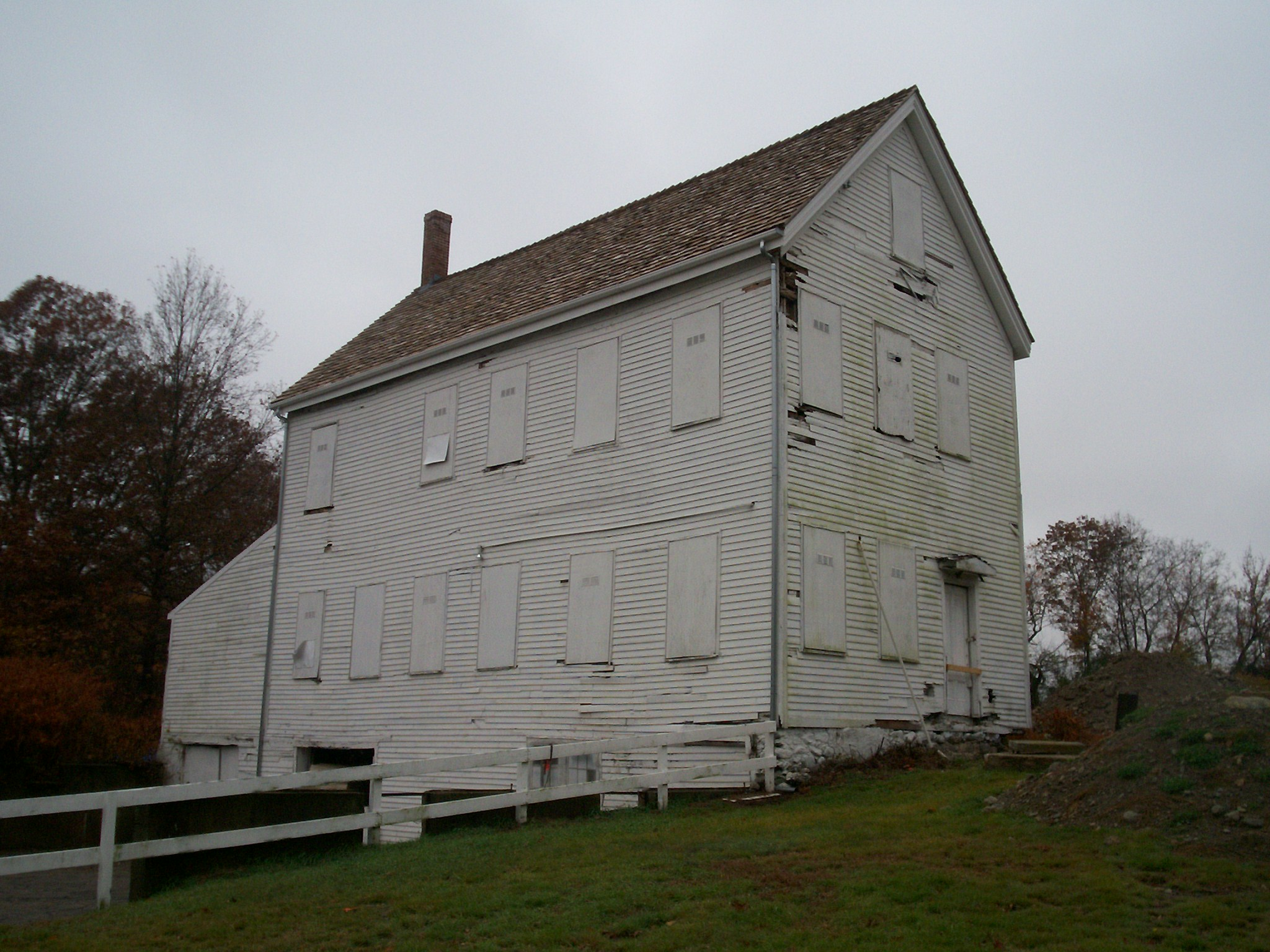
The Print Shop, constructed in about 1890, is the last remaining historic building at Brook Farm, though it is not associated with the Transcendentalist Utopian community. It was built by the Lutheran Church, which operated the Martin Luther Orphan's Home on the property from 1871 to 1944.

A man named John Plummer purchased the land that was Brook Farm in 1849 before selling it six years later to James Freeman Clarke, who intended to establish another community there. Instead, Clarke offered it to President Abraham Lincoln during the American Civil War and the 2nd Massachusetts Infantry Regiment used it for training as Camp Andrew.

Clarke sold the property in 1868 to two brothers, who used it as a summer boarding house. In 1870, Gottlieb F. Burckhardt purchased the property, after which he formed the Association of the Evangelical Lutheran Church for Works of Mercy to operate an orphanage in The Hive, as the property's main house. The orphanage opened in 1872 and operated until 1943. In 1948 the Lutherans converted it into a treatment center and school, which closed in 1977. Parts of the farm were separated in 1873 for use as a cemetery, a use that continues today as a non-denominational cemetery known as the Gardens of Gethsemene (as part of St. Joseph's Cemetery and the Baker Street Jewish Cemeteries). During the period of Lutheran ownership the only now extant building, a c. 1890 print shop, was built on the land; the buildings associated with the Transcendentalists, most recently the Margaret Fuller Cottage, had burned down by the 1980s.

In 1988, the Metropolitan District Commission (since merged with the Massachusetts Department of Conservation and Recreation, or DCR) purchased 148 acres (0.60 km^{2}) of the original land. The farm was declared a U.S. National Historic Landmark in 1965, a Boston Landmark in 1977, and is listed on the National Register of Historic Places. The DCR now operate the state-owned portion as a historic site; the West Roxbury Historical Society periodically offers tours.

== Landscape and facilities ==
Brook Farm was named for the brook that ran near the roadside and eventually went to the Charles River. It was surrounded by low hills and its meadows and sunny slopes were diversified by orchard, quiet groves and denser pine woods. But the land turned out to be difficult to farm.

The land on the Keith lot that was purchased along with the Ellis farm included a functional farmhouse, which Brook Farmers called "The Hive". The Hive became the center for social activities and was where community members went for three meals a day. The Hive's dining room held 50 people and its library was stocked with Ripley's personal book collection, which was made available to all members.

As the community grew, it became necessary to add more buildings for lodgings and various activities. The first building constructed was "The Nest", where school lessons took place and where guests of the farm would stay. Mr. and Mrs. Ripley's house, later called the Eyrie, was built during the second year. The next building to be built was the Margaret Fuller Cottage; though named after Fuller, she never spent a night there. A Brook Farm participant named Ichabod Morton built the Pilgrim House, named in honor of his home town of Plymouth, Massachusetts. The 2 1/2-story building was the third structure built that year, at a cost of nearly $5,000. Morton stayed there only two weeks before moving out, after which the building was used for general lodging and also held laundry facilities. The many constructions, including greenhouses and small craft shops, quickly reduced the treasury.

== Community life ==
=== Work and finances ===
Participants at Brook Farm were also shareholders and were promised 5% of the annual profits or free tuition for one student. In exchange for 300 days of work per year, they were granted free room and board. Members performed whatever work most appealed to them and all, including women, were paid equal wages. The philosophy of labor, according to Ripley, was "to insure a more natural union between intellectual and manual labor than now exists; to combine the thinker and the worker, as far as possible, in the same individual."

The organization of work in Brook Farm changed over time because of both financial troubles and changes in ideology. Members of Brook Farm initially participated in an "attractive industry" system where each could pick work assignments based on personal preferences. This method had no specific authority to ensure that essential tasks were done. After initial leniency, some sensed that not all members were doing their fair share of the labor, so in 1841 the community adopted standards for work: ten hours of work were required per day during the summer and eight hours during winter. When Brook Farm first adopted Fourierist notions, it created a more structured work environment with a system that consisted of three series of industry: agriculture, mechanical, and domestic. Within each series were a number of groups that handled more specific tasks. Each group had a chief who kept a record of the work done. While this system created a new work hierarchy, the members still had the flexibility to move between groups easily. These new measures caused Brook Farm to make a profit in 1844, a feat it had not accomplished in its first few years of existence.

Typical work duties at Brook Farm included chopping wood, bringing in firewood, milking cows, turning a grindstone, and other farming chores. Not all were farmers, however. Some worked in the trades, including making shoes, and others were teachers. Regardless of the job, all were considered equal and because of the job distribution, as Elizabeth Peabody wrote, "no one has any great weight in any one thing". In exchange for their work, participants were granted several "guarantees", including "medical attendance, nursing, education in all departments, amusements". There were some occasional conflicts between different workers, partly because those who were educators believed themselves more aristocratic; overall, however, as historian Charles Crowe wrote, "indeed all aspects of communal life operated with surprisingly little friction" in general.

People visited Brook Farm frequently, totaling an estimated 1,150 each year, and each was charged for their visit. Between November 1844 and October 1845, surviving records show that $425 was collected from visitor fees. The list of visitors included theologian Henry James, Sr., sculptor William Wetmore Story, artist John Sartain, and British social reformer Robert Owen.

Despite multiple sources of income, the community was in constant debt almost immediately after it began. The community, including Ripley, had difficulty with farming, in particular because of poor soil and not enough labor. The major crop was hay, which was sold at low-grade prices; vegetables, milk, and fruit were not produced in sufficient numbers to be profitable. The property was mortgaged four times between 1841 and 1845. Brook Farm got into the habit of spending money before it had been raised. One Brook Farmer wrote, "I think here lies the difficulty,—we have not had business men to conduct our affairs ... those among us who have some business talents, see this error".

=== Education ===
On September 29, 1841, the "Brook Farm Institute of Agriculture and Education" was organized. The school was Brook Farm's most immediate (and at times only) source of income and attracted students from as far away as Cuba and the Philippines. Children under 12 were charged $3.50 per week and, at first, boys over 12 were charged $4 a week and girls were charged $5; by August 1842, the rates were made identical. Adult education was also available in the evenings. The schedule for adults included courses on moral philosophy, German language, and modern European history.

Within the school there was an infant school for children under six, a primary school for children under ten, and a preparatory school that prepared children for college in six years. When entering the school, each pupil under high-school age was assigned a woman of the community who was in charge of his/her wardrobe, personal habits, and exercise. The teachers included three graduates of Harvard Divinity School (George Ripley, George Partridge Bradford, and John Sullivan Dwight) and several women (Ripley's wife Sophia, his sister Marianne, and his cousin Hannah, Georgianna Bruce, and Abby Morton). Ripley was in charge of teaching English and was known to be relaxed in his class. Dana taught languages, speaking ten himself. Dwight taught music and Latin. Students studied European languages and literature and, at no extra cost, pupils could also indulge in the fine arts. The primary school was overseen by Sophia and Marianne Ripley, using a progressive child-centered pedagogy that has been compared to John Dewey's later reforms. Sophia Ripley's dedication to the school was remarked upon by many; she missed only two classes in six years.

=== Leisure ===
The people of Brook Farm spent most of their time either studying or working the farm, but they always set aside time for play. In their free time, they enjoyed music, dancing, card games, drama, costume parties, sledding, and skating. Every week, the community would gather at The Hive for a dance by the young ladies of the community. They wore wreaths of wild daisies on their heads, and each week a special wreath, bought from a florist, was given to the best-dressed girl. At the end of every day, many performed a "symbol of Universal Unity", in which they stood in a circle and joined hands and vowed for "truth to the cause of God and Humanity".

Spirits remained high throughout the experiment, regardless of the community's financial standing. The social structure demanded selflessness and people rarely failed to fulfill their duties, a requirement to earn leisure time. Leisure time was important to Brook Farm's philosophy. As Elizabeth Palmer Peabody wrote for The Dial in January 1842, "none will be engaged merely in bodily labor ... This community aims to be rich, not in the metallic representative of wealth, but in ... leisure to live in all the faculties of the soul".

=== Role of women ===
At Brook Farm, women could go beyond their typical sphere of tasks and their labor was highly valued. They did have tasks typical of other women at the time, such as simple food preparation, and shared housekeeping. But during harvest time, women were allowed to work in the fields and men even helped out with laundry during the cold weather. Because no single religion could impose its beliefs on the community, women were safe from the typical patriarchy associated with religion at the time. Because of the community's focus on individual freedom, women were autonomous from their husbands and allowed to become stockholders. Women also played an important role in providing sources of income. Many devoted time to making, in Brook Farmer Marianne Dwight's words, "elegant and tasteful caps, capes, collars, undersleeves, etc., etc.," for sale at Boston shops. Others painted screens and lampshades for sale. Women were allowed to go to school and, because of the well-known education of women at Brook Farm, many female writers and performers visited. Sophia Ripley, who had written an outspoken feminist essay for The Dial on "Woman" before moving to Brook Farm, was very educated and taught history and foreign languages at the farm.

== Criticism ==
Many people in the community wrote of how much they enjoyed their experience and the lighthearted atmosphere. One participant, John Codman, joined the community at age 27 in 1843. He wrote, "It was for the meanest a life above humdrum, and for the greatest something far, infinitely far beyond. They looked into the gates of life and saw beyond charming visions, and hopes springing up for all". But the community's idealism was sometimes not lived up to. Because the community was officially secular, a variety of religions were represented, though not always amicably. When Isaac Hecker and, later, Sophia Ripley converted to Catholicism, a Protestant Brook Farmer complained, "We are beginning to see wooden crosses around and pictures of saints ... and I suspect that rosaries are rattling under aprons."

Nathaniel Hawthorne, eventually elected treasurer of the community, did not enjoy his experience. Initially, he praised the work he was doing, boasting of "what a great, broad-shouldered, elephantine personage I shall become by and by!" Later, he wrote to his wife-to-be Sophia Peabody, "labor is the curse of the world, and nobody can meddle with it without becoming proportionately brutified". After dissociating with the community, Hawthorne demanded the return of his initial investment, though he never held any ill will toward Ripley, to whom he wrote he would "heartily rejoice at your success—of which I can see no reasonable doubt".

Many outside Brook Farm were critical of it, especially in the press. The New York Observer, for example, wrote, "The Associationists, under the pretense of a desire to promote order and morals, design to overthrow the marriage institution, and in the place of the divine law, to substitute the 'passions' as the proper regulator of the intercourse of the sexes", concluding that they were "secretly and industriously aiming to destroy the foundation of society". Edgar Allan Poe expressed his opinions on the community in an article titled "Brook Farm" in the December 13, 1845, issue of the Broadway Journal. He wrote that he had "sincere respect" for the group and that its journal, The Harbinger, was "conducted by an assemblage of well-read persons who mean no harm—and who, perhaps, can do no less". Despite many critics, none suggested George Ripley be replaced as Brook Farm's leader.

Ralph Waldo Emerson never joined the Brook Farm community, despite several invitations. He wrote to Ripley on December 15, 1840, of his "conviction that the Community is not good for me". He also questioned the community's idealism, particularly its optimism that all members would share responsibility and workload equally. As he wrote, "The country members naturally were surprised to observe that one man ploughed all day and one looked out of a window all day ... and both received at night the same wages". Twenty years later, Emerson publicly denounced the experiment in his essay collection The Conduct of Life. Charles Lane, one of the founders of another community called Fruitlands, thought the Brook Farmers' lifestyle did not sacrifice enough. He said they were "playing away their youth and day-time in a miserably joyous frivolous manner". Like other communities, Brook Farm was criticized for its potential to break up the nuclear family because of its focus on working as a larger community. After its conversion to Fourierism, the Transcendentalists showed less support for it. Henry David Thoreau questioned the community members' idealism and wrote in his journal, "As for these communities, I think I had rather keep bachelor's hall in hell than go to board in heaven". Even Sophia Ripley later questioned their original optimism, calling it "childish, empty, & sad".

== In fiction ==
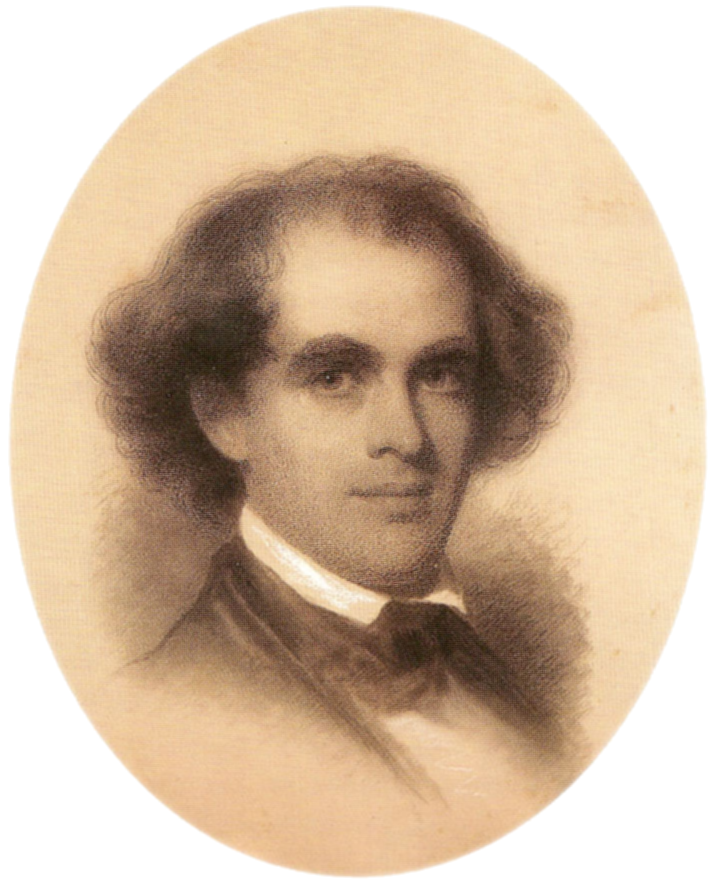
A founding member, Hawthorne later fictionalized his experience at Brook Farm in The Blithedale Romance.

Though a founding member, Hawthorne was unhappy during his tenure as a Brook Farmer, partly because he was unable to write while living there. "I have no quiet at all", he complained, and his hands were covered "with a new crop of blisters—the effect of raking hay". He presented a fictionalized portrait of his experience in his 1852 novel The Blithedale Romance. He acknowledged the resemblance in his introduction, saying "in the 'Blithedale' of this volume, many readers will probably suspect a faint and not very faithful shadowing of Brook Farm, in West Roxbury, which (now a little more than ten years ago) was occupied and cultivated by a company of socialists." The chapter called "The Masqueraders", for example, was based on a picnic held one September to celebrate the harvest season. George Ripley, who reviewed the book for the New York Tribune, said that former Brook Farmers would only notice the resemblance in the humorous parts of the story. Some have also seen a resemblance between Margaret Fuller and Hawthorne's fictional character Zenobia. In the novel, a visitor—a writer like Hawthorne—finds that hard farm labor is not conducive to intellectual creativity. In his introduction, Hawthorne insisted that, although his experience with Brook Farm undoubtedly influenced his concept of a utopian community, the characters in his novel did not represent any specific Brook Farmers.

== See also ==
- National Register of Historic Places listings in southern Boston, Massachusetts
- List of American utopian communities
