= Marie-Josephte Fitzbach =

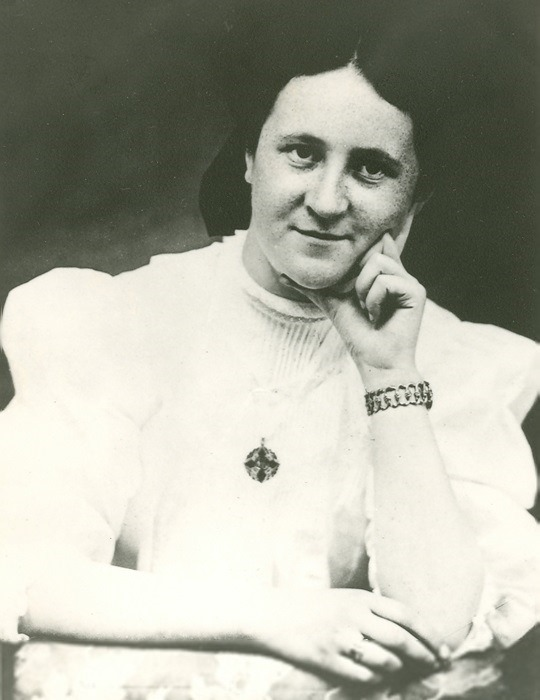
Marie-Josephte Fitzbach

Marie-Josephte Fitzbach (October 16, 1806 – September 1, 1885) was the founder of the Good Shepherd Sisters of Québec.

The daughter of Charles Fitzbach, a native of Luxembourg, and Geneviève Nadeau, she was born in St-Vallier de Bellechasse, Lower Canada. She did not go to school as a child and left home at the age of 13 to become a housekeeper in Quebec City to support her family. Three years later, she began working for François-Xavier Roy, a merchant. At the same time, she paid a student to teach her how to read and write and basic accounting.

Following the death of her employer's wife, she married Mr. Roy in 1828 at Cap-Santé; he had two children and the couple had three more daughters. After her husband died in 1833, the two older children were put in the care of grandparents and she was left to raise her three daughters. One daughter died in 1846. In 1849, her two daughters joined the Sisters of Charity of Quebec. She moved to the Sisters' hospice to be closer to her daughters. In December 1849, at the request of bishop Pierre-Flavien Turgeon, she established St. Magdalen's Refuge, a home for women released from prison. In February 1856, as Mother Mary of the Sacred Heart, she became the first mother superior for the Good Shepherds of Quebec. She was the first person born in Quebec to found a religious order.

Her portrait was painted by painter Marie-Elmina Anger, a member of the Sisters of the Good Shepherd in Quebec who also painted the portraits of other Quebec religious figures.

She was declared venerable in June 2012.

== Good Shepherd Sisters ==
The Community developed from the St. Vincent de Paul Society of Quebec. In 1849, upon visiting the city jail, lawyer George Manly Muir was moved to create a women's shelter. Muir was president of the SVP and persuaded the other members to undertake a house of refuge. The Society rented a house, but needed someone to manage it. Bishop Turgeon recommended the widow Roy.
