= George Partridge Bradford =

American writer and teacher (1807–1890)

George Partridge Bradford (February 16, 1807 – January 26, 1890) was an American writer and teacher.

George Partridge Bradford was born on February 16, 1807, in Duxbury, Massachusetts, to Elizabeth (Hicking) and Gamaliel Bradford. He graduated from Harvard College in 1825 and Harvard Divinity School in 1828.

Bradford joined the Brook Farm community and contributed to some of its publications. He gave a few lyceum lectures on English literature in Concord, Massachusetts, and published a book called Thoughts on Spiritual Subjects Translated from the Writings of Fénelon (1843).

Bradford died on January 26, 1890, in Cambridge, Massachusetts.
