= Giulia Centurelli =

Italian painter and poet

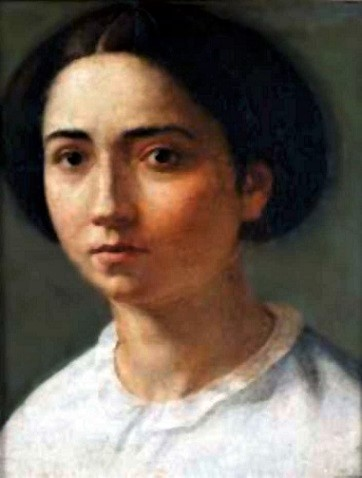
- Born: 31 October 1832; Ascoli Piceno, Italy
- Died: 24 January 1872 (aged 39); Rome, Italy

Giulia Centurelli (31 October 1832, in Ascoli Piceno – 24 January 1872, in Rome) was an Italian painter and poet.

== Life ==
Giulia Centurelli was born on 31 October 1832 in Ascoli Piceno. She studied at the Institute of Fine Arts in the Piceno capital. At a young age Centurelli joined the secret Mazzinian association Dante Apostolate, and developed a long correspondence with its founder Nicola Gaetani Tamburini. In 1857 the papal police discovered the activity of the Dante Apostolate and arrested Tamburini and other members of the association. Centurelli was also taken to prison, but due to very young age was soon released from prison and entrusted to sisters of the Civil Hospital of Ascoli Piceno. A year later Centurelli was freed and on 19 September 1860 she wrote verses “Thanksgiving on the day of the rescue”. In November 1860, Centurelli actively collected signatures for joining the Kingdom of Sardinia during the plebiscite.

In 1861, Centurelli participated in an exhibition in Florence with a copy of the Annunciation, taken from the original by Guido Reni. Centurelli taught drawing in the Scuola Normale in Ascole. In 1870, she moved to Rome where she started working in the Female High School.

== Works ==
Many of Centurelli's drawings and miniatures have been dispersed, however such works as “Amorino”, “Holy Family” (a copy of Madonna della Cesta by Pieter Paul Rubens, 1615), “Self-portrait” and the “Portrait of Italo Selva” can be found in Pinacoteca di Ascoli. Centurelli's poetic works were published in newspapers such as “La Vita Nuova” in Rome and “il Giornale” in Ascoli. She also translated the songs of the Magyar poet Sandor Petofi published in Rome in 1871. On 22 January 1872, Centurelli was appointed an effective member of the International Artistic Association.

Giulia Centurelli died of smallpox on 24 January 1872.
