= Louisa Ellen Perman =

Scottish painter (1854–1921)

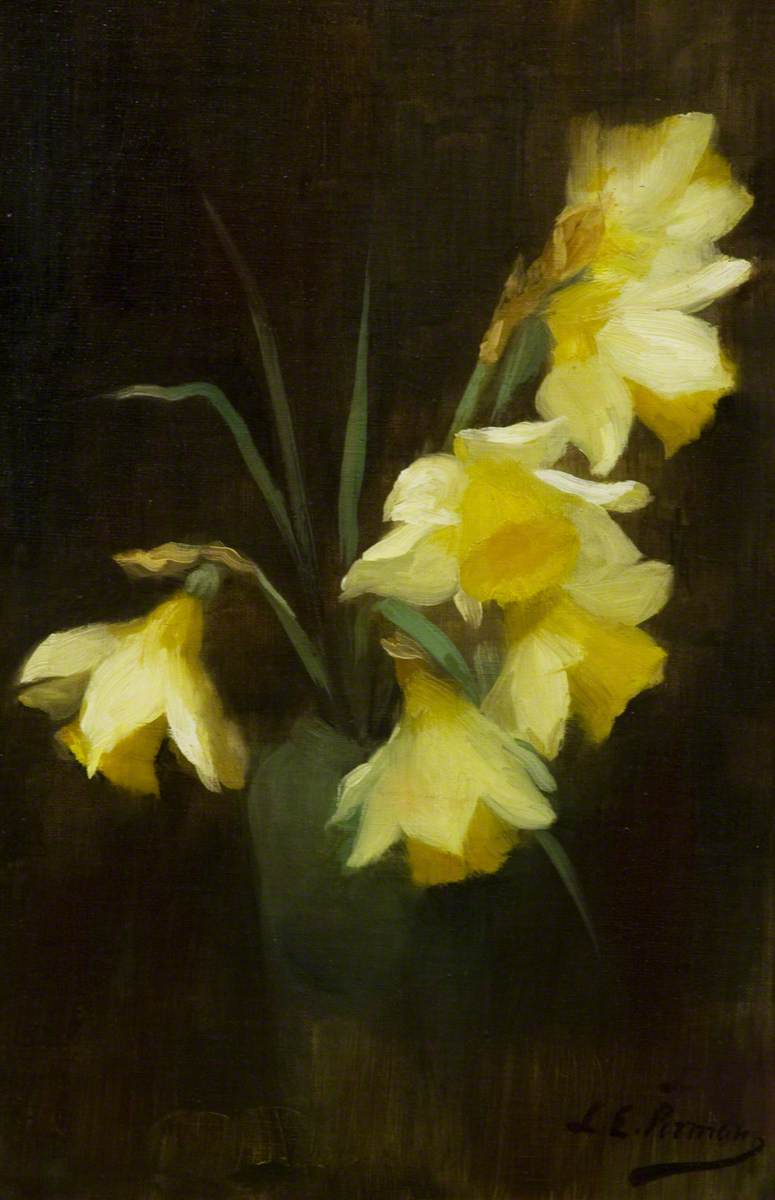
Daffodils in a Vase

Louisa Ellen Perman (also known as Louisa E. Perman and Mrs James Torrance; 1854–1921) was a Scottish flower-painter.

== Life ==
Born in Renfrewshire, she studied at Glasgow School of Art from 1884 to 1890 and was influenced by the work of Stuart Park. She exhibited flower paintings at the Royal Academy and the Royal Scottish Academy, as well as in Munich, Dresden, Berlin, Hanover and Prague. She served as Vice-President of the Glasgow and West of Scotland Lady Artists' Club.

In 1912, she married fellow artist and book illustrator James Torrance, and they set up a home and studios at Helensburgh. In 1916 they staged an exhibition in Glasgow to raise a relief fund for World War I. Louisa died in Helensburgh in 1921, donating her and her husband's art to Glasgow museums and leaving money to establish an annual prize at the Royal Glasgow Fine Art Institute.
