= Jane Hawkins =

British painter (1841–1904)

- Born: 1841
- Died: 1904 (aged 62–63)
- Known for: Portrait painting
- Patrons: Derby Family

Jane Hawkins (1841–1904) was a British portrait painter from Chelsea who exhibited at the Royal Academy and with the Society of British Artists.

Hawkins public paintings are mostly of political individuals especially those of the family of the Earl of Derby. Hawkins produced portraits some copying the styles of Francis Grant and James Rannie Swinton.

Many of her paintings of the Smith-Stanley family of Derby are in the collection of Hughenden Manor since 1947.
