= Anne Huntington Allen =

American painter (born 1858)

- Born: Anne Huntington; 1858; New York, New York
- Died: 1946 (aged 87–88); Cincinnati, Ohio
- Known for: Painting

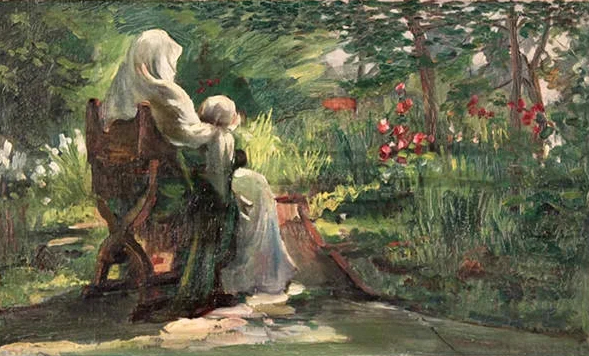
Annie Huntington Allen - A Sunny Spot

Anne Huntington Allen (1858 – 1946) was an American painter. She was born in New York in 1858. She attended the Cooper Institute, the Art Academy of Cincinnati, and the Académie Colarossi. Her teachers included Carolus-Duran, Frank Duveneck, and Jean-Jacques Henner.

Sources are inconsistent about her place and year of death. AKL Online states Allen died in Cincinnati, Ohio in 1946. Other sources list no death date or 1935. Some sources state that she died in California.
