= Cécile Douard =

Belgian artist

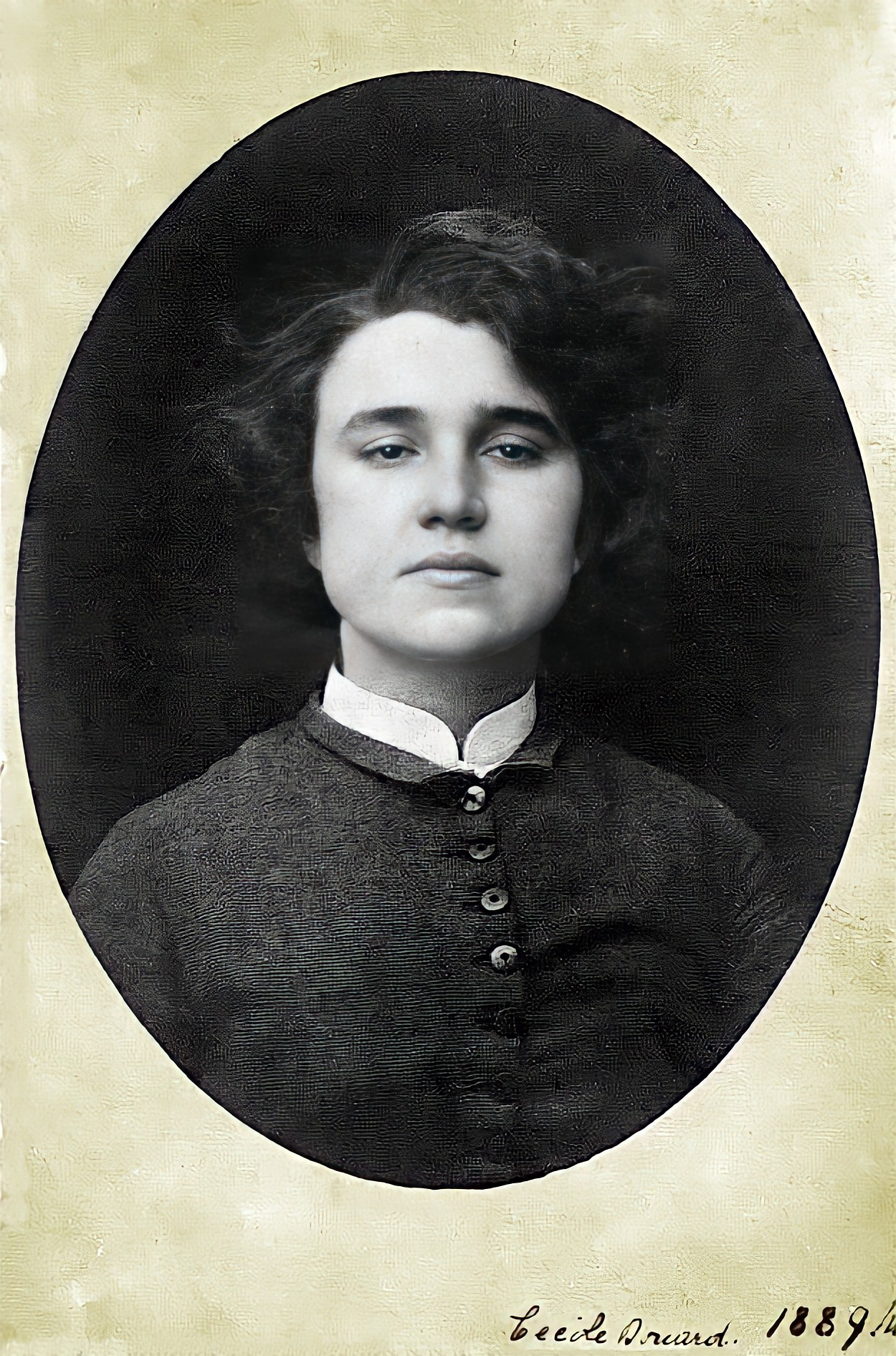
- Born: Cécile Leseine; 29 December 1866; Rouen, France
- Died: 14 January 1941 (aged 74); Brussels, Belgium
- Known for: Painting, Sculpture

Cécile Douard (1866-1941) was a Belgian artist.

== Biography ==
Douard was born Cécile Leseine on 29 December 1866 in Rouen, France. She studied under Antoine Bourlard. Douard often painted the people and landscape of the coalmining town Borinage.

At the age of 33 Douard lost her sight. No longer able to paint, she became a sculptor. She also played the piano and violin. She wrote two books; "Impressions of a Second Life" in 1923, and "Paysages indistincts" in 1929. In 1926 she became he president of the Ligue Braille (Braille League). She served in that position until 1937.

Douard died on 14 January 1941 in Brussels, Belgium.

== Gallery ==
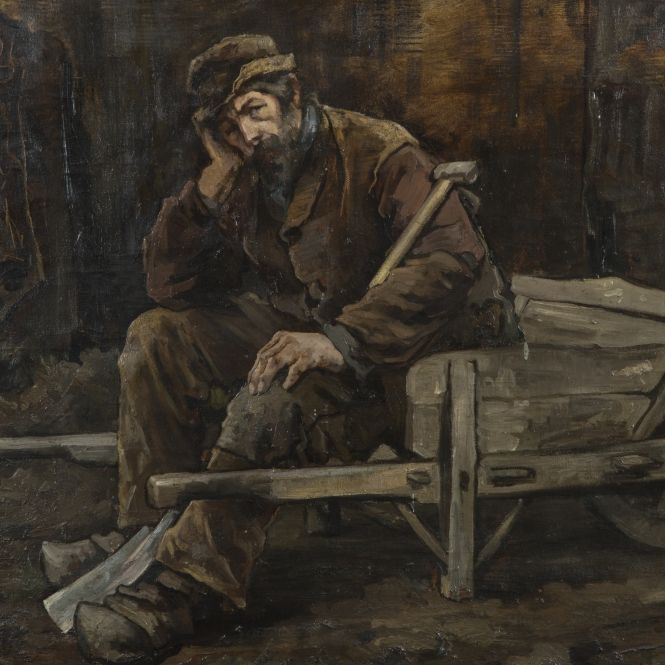
Digger in Wheelbarrow, 1896

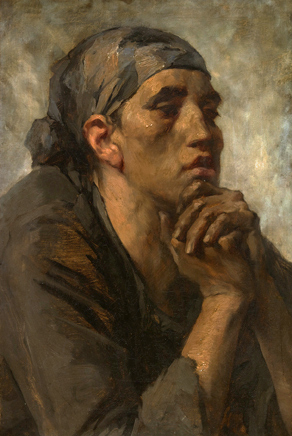
Boraine

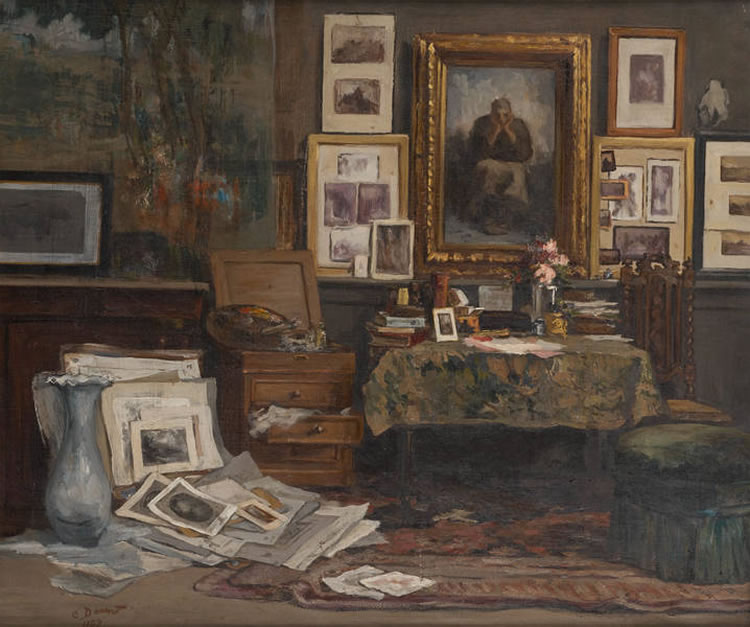
Intérieur dartiste
