= Alice Blair Ring =

American painter

Alice Blair Ring (May 4, 1869 – March 17, 1947) was an American painter.

== Biography ==
Alice Blair Ring was born in Knightville, Hampshire County, Massachusetts on May 4, 1869. She studied art at Oberlin College from 1886 to 1890. She attended the Art Students League of New York before traveling to Europe to continue her art studies.

In 1900, Ring joined George Hitchcock's "Art Summer School" in Egmond aan Zee, Holland, where she painted landscapes and typical Dutch scenes.

Ring and her mother moved to Pomona, California around 1912.

In 1916, three of Ring's paintings were displayed in the Post-Exposition Exhibition of the Panama–Pacific International Exposition in San Francisco. During her career, Ring's paintings were also exhibited at the Paris Salon and at the Art Institute of Chicago. Ring served as the vice president of the International Art Union, a group of women artists, in Paris.

Ring died in Pomona on March 17, 1947. She willed her house to Pilgrim Church in Pomona. Church officials found several works of art in the house. Some of these are now displayed at the church. Others have made their way into estate sales in the area. Ring's Sunshine in the Morning, now owned by Bob Constant, was part of a traveling exhibition in 2010 and 2011, titled "Dutch Utopia: American Artists in Holland, 1885-1914." The exhibition ended at the Singer Museum in Laren, North Holland.

== Selected works ==
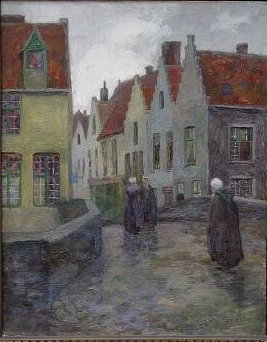
Dutch street landscape, c. 1900–1905

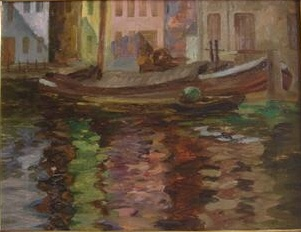
Canalboat in Alkmaar, c. 1900–1905

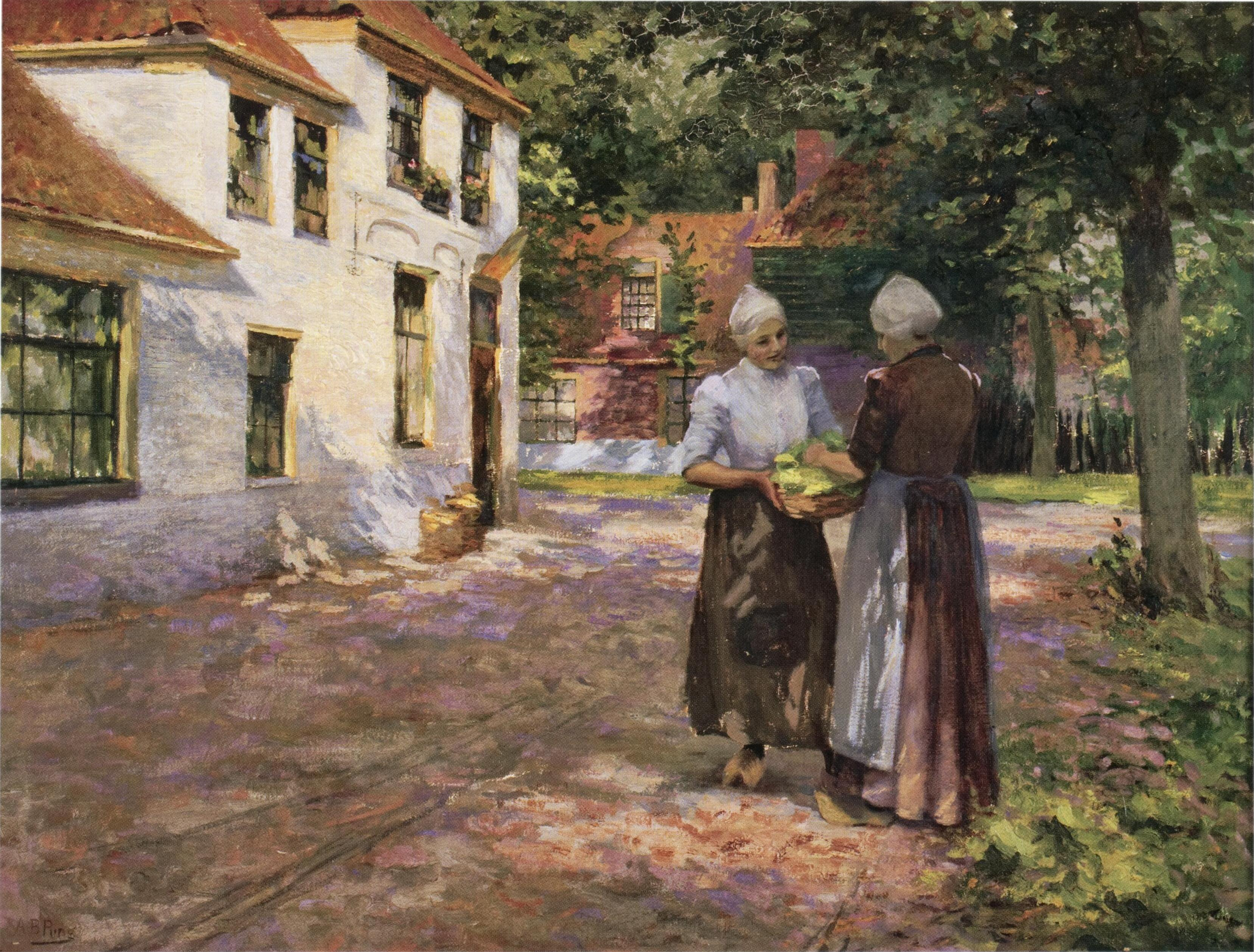
Sunshine in the Morning, 1906

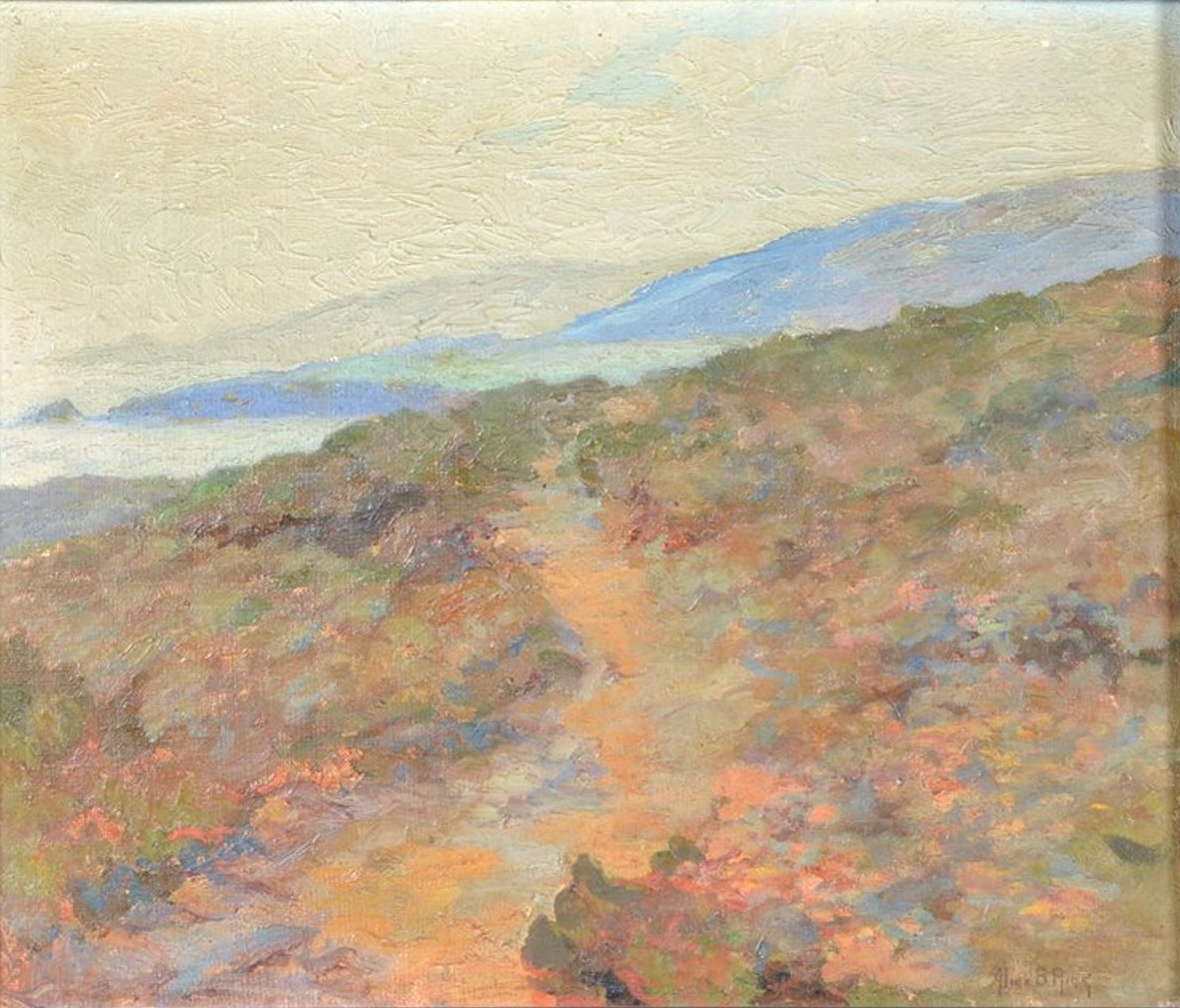
California Coastal, after 1906
