= Marianne Dwight Orvis =

American letter writer and painter

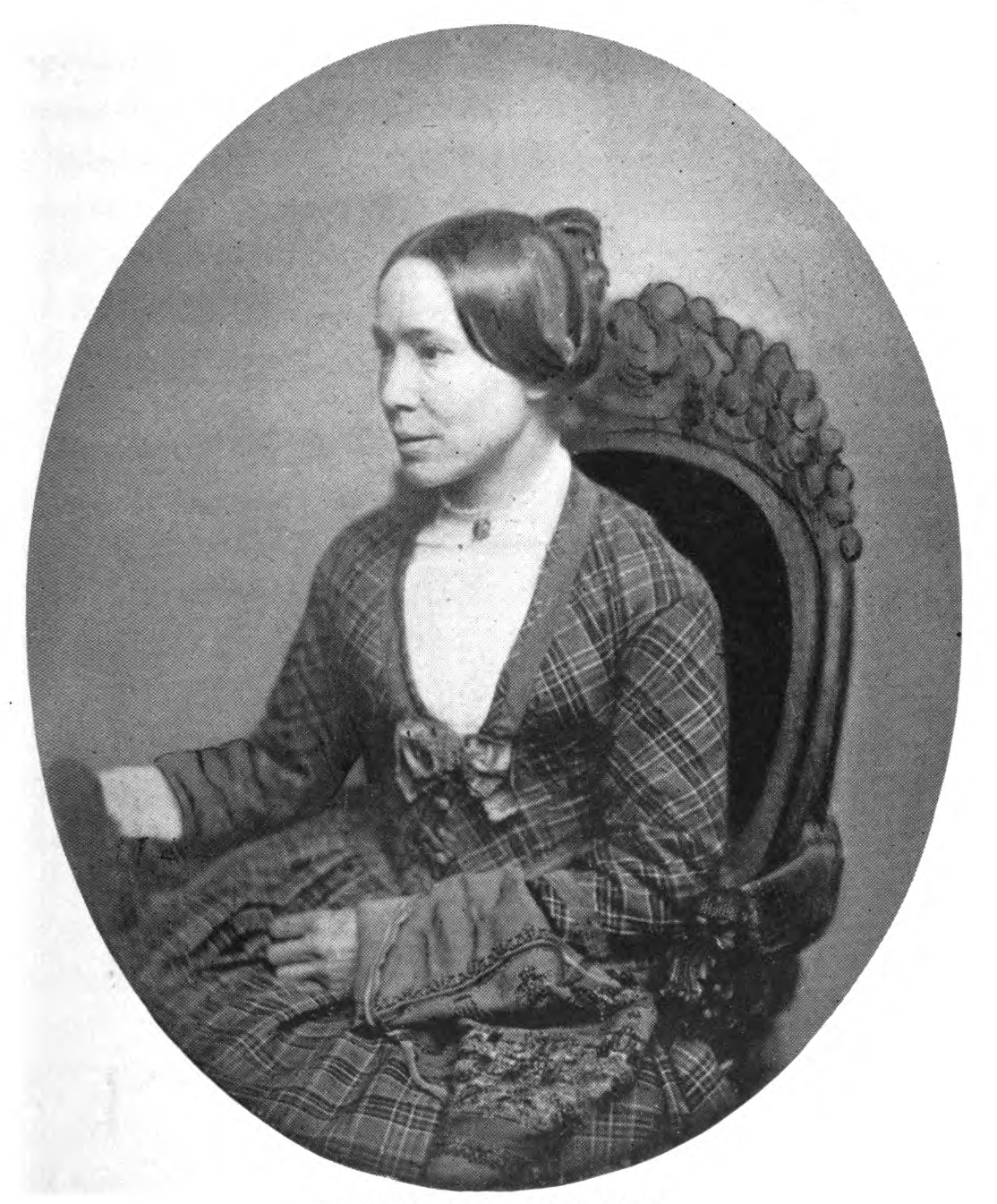
- Born: April 4, 1816; Boston
- Died: December 12, 1901; Boston
- Occupations: Correspondent, painter

Marianne Dwight Orvis (April 4, 1816 – December 12, 1901) was an American letter writer and painter. Her letters, later published in Letters from Brook Farm, 1844-1847 (1928) provide a valuable account of daily life on the utopian community of Brook Farm.

Marianne Dwight was born on April 4, 1816 in Boston, Massachusetts, the second of four children of Dr. John Dwight, a physician, and Mary Corey Dwight. In 1844, the Dwight family, including Marianne and two of her adult siblings, moved to Brook Farm in West Roxbury, Massachusetts. Her letters describe her work for the community painting items such as lampshades and watercolors of flowers for sale, visits by people like Margaret Fuller and Ralph Waldo Emerson, and congenial relationships with others at Brook Farm.

At Brook Farm, she met another resident named John Orvis. Marianne and John Orvis were married on Christmas Eve 1846 by William Henry Channing in the only wedding ever performed on Brook Farm.

After the dissolution of Brook Farm in 1847, the couple settled in Jamaica Plain. They had two children: Christel (born 1848) and Helen (born 1850).

Marianne Dwight Orvis died on December 12, 1901, in Boston.
