= Agnes Meyerhof =

German artist (1856-1942)

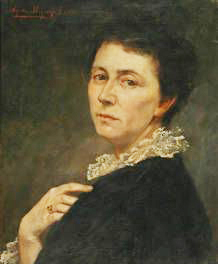
- Born: June 2, 1856; Hildesheim, Germany
- Died: August 22, 1942 (aged 86); Terezín, German-occupied Czechoslovakia (now the Czech Republic)

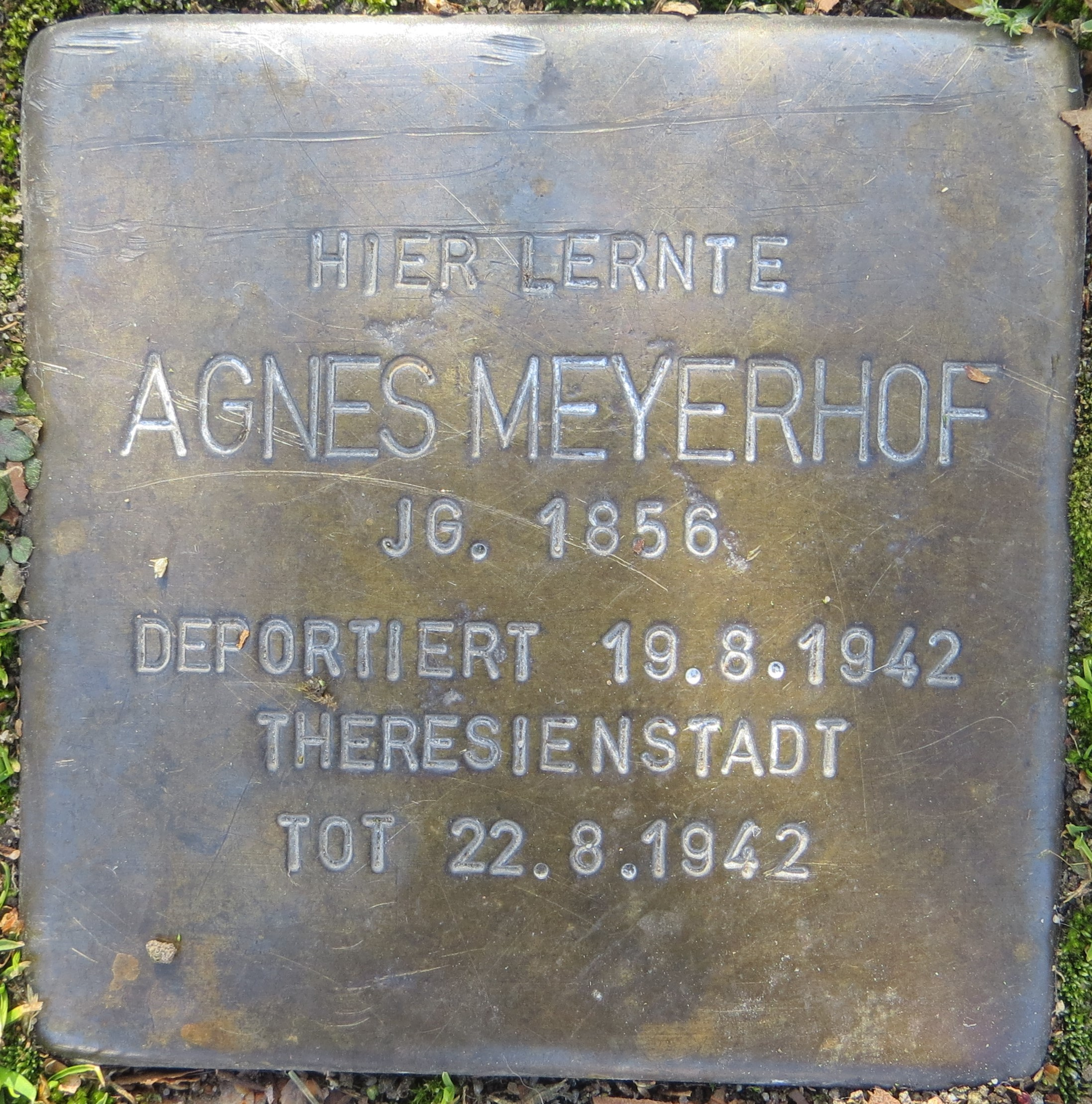
Meyerhof, Agnes - Goslarsche Str. 65-66

Agnes Meyerhof (1856-1942) was a German illustrator, and painter.

Meyerhof was born on either June 2, 1856 or June 2, 1858 in Hildesheim, Germany.

Meyerhof was murdered on August 22, 1942 in Theresienstadt concentration camp in Terezín, German-occupied Czechoslovakia. She was 86 years old.

Her work is in the collection of the Städel museum.

In 2010 a stolperstein in her honor was installed at Goslarsche Straße 65-66, Hildesheim.
