= Anna Lillian Winegar =

American painter

Anna Lillian Winegar (1867-1941) was an American painter and illustrator. From about 1900 until 1935 she was associated with the Artists of Bronxville.

== Early life and education ==
Anna Lillian Winegar was born in 1867 in Plainwell, Michigan. She graduated from Wellesley College in 1892. Winegar studied in Italy and Paris with Frank Edwin Scott, Giuseppe Costelini, Franklin Bothe, Raphael Collin and Kerson. She studied at the Académie Colarossi and the Art Students League of New York.

== Career as artist ==
Winegar was active as an artist in Brooklyn, New York. She was a member of the National Association of Women Painters and Sculptors, and the MacDowell Club. She was a resident of Bronxville, New York from about 1900 until 1935. She became known for her impressionist landscapes and garden scenes.

== Death ==
Winegar died in 1941 in Tucson, Arizona.
