= Grace Woodbridge Geer =

American artist

- Born: 1854; Boston, Massachusetts
- Died: June 27, 1939 (aged 84–85); Boston, Massachusetts
- Known for: Painting

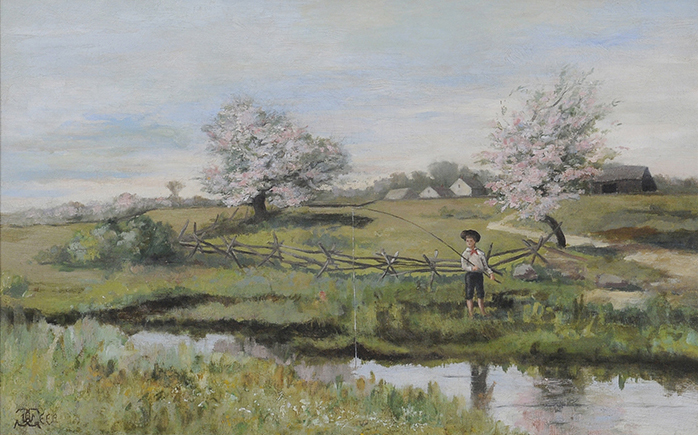
Summer Pastime

Grace Woodbridge Geer (1854-1938) was an American painter.

== Biography ==
Geer was born in 1854 in Boston, Massachusetts. She studied at the Massachusetts Normal Art School and the Lowell Institute She also received instruction from Edmund C. Tarbell, Frank Hector Tompkins, Samuel Triscott, and Robert Vonnoh.

She was a member of the Copley Society of Art, the American Society of Miniature Painters, the Massachusetts Society of Mayflower Descendants, and the Professional Women's Club of Boston. Her miniatures were exhibited at the Copley Society, the Museum of Fine Arts, Boston, the National Academy of Design, and the Pennsylvania Academy of the Fine Arts.

Geer died on June 27, 1938, in Boston.
