= Marie-Elmina Anger =

Catholic nun and artist in Quebec

Marie-Elmina Anger (December 24, 1844 – November 5, 1901) was a Catholic nun and artist in Quebec. She was also known as Sister Marie de Jésus.

== Biography ==
The daughter of Séraphin Anger and Rose de Lima Anger, she was born in Pointe-aux-Trembles (later Neuville), Lower Canada. She was educated by the Good Shepherd Sisters of Québec. She became a novice in 1860 and took her vows three years later. She was first assigned to teaching but, after her talent for painting was discovered, she began taking private lessons with portrait artist Eugène Hamel.

She painted more than sixty canvases on religious themes which can be found in churches in Quebec, Ontario and New England. She also painted portraits of prominent Quebec religious figures, including Marie-Josephte Fitzbach, the founder of the Sisters of the Good Shepherd in Quebec, Élisabeth Bruyère, Émilie Tavernier, Marie-Anne-Marcelle Mallet, Archbishop Charles-François Baillargeon, Archbishop Elzéar-Alexandre Taschereau and Charles-Félix Cazeau.

She died in Quebec City at the age of 56.
