= Elisabetta Benato-Beltrami =

19th-century Italian painter and sculptor

Elisabetta Benato-Beltrami (1813–1888) was a 19th-century Italian painter and sculptor. She lived in Padua since 1858. Her talent, which showed itself early, was first developed by an unknown painter named Soldan, and later at the Accademia di Belle Arti di Venezia. She made copies of Guido, Sassoferrato and Veronese, the Laokoon group, and the Hercules of Canova, and executed a much-admired bas-relief called "Love and Innocence." Among her original paintings are an "Atala and Chactas," " Petrarch's First Meeting with Laura," a "Descent from the Cross " for the church at Tribano, a "St. Sebastian," "Melancholy," a "St. Ciro," and many Madonnas. Her pictures are noble in conception and firm in execution. She exhibited in Milan in 1847.
