= Quirina Alippi-Fabretti =

Italian painter (1849–1919)

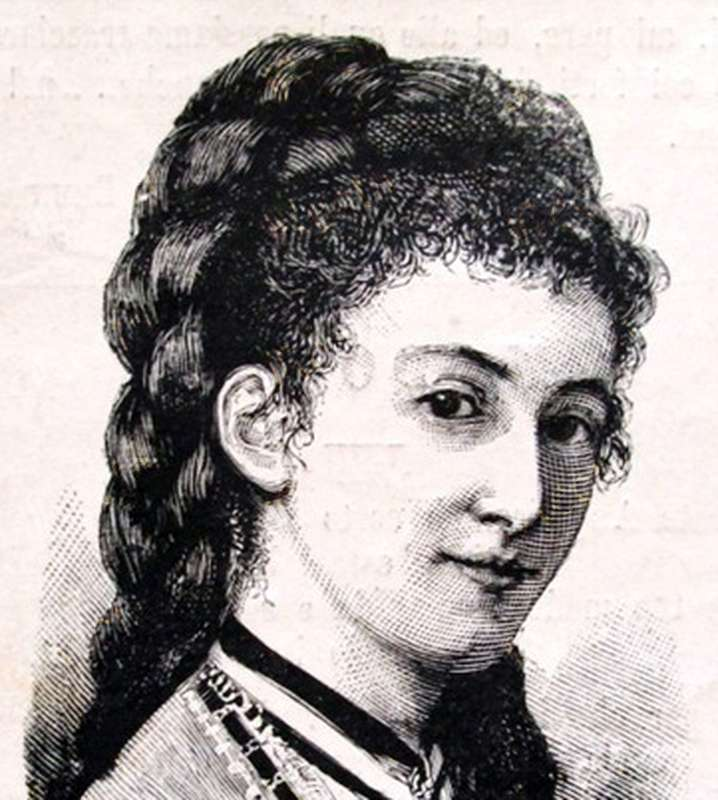
Picture of Quirina Alippi-Fabretti from postage stamp (1882)

Quirina Alippi-Fabretti (1849 –1919) was an Italian painter.

== Biography ==
She was born in Urbino, the daughter of the jurisconsult Luigi Alippi and mother Elvira Boddi. She studied drawing and painting in Rome with Nicola Ortis and Guglielmo De Sanctis. She followed her father to Perugia in 1874, where he had been transferred to be part of the Court of Appeals. There she continued her study under Francesco Moretti. She married Ferdinando Fabretti in 1877, and resided most of her life in Perugia. She was respected as a copyist, painting a copy of Perugino's Presepio for a church in Mount Lebanon, Syria. She painted a St. Stephen for the same church.

She was awarded a silver medal at a competition in Perugia on 16 December 1879; she became an honorary member of the Royal Academy in Urbino and of the Academy of Fine Arts in Perugia. In 1884, in Turin, she painted an interior vedute of the "Great Hall of the Exchange of Perugia". She painted interior views of the church of San Giovanni del Cambio in Perugia, and of the vestibule of the Confraternity of St Francis. In addition to her portraits, she painted an Odalisque, an Old Woman Fortune-teller, and a St. Catherine.
