= Very =

Very may refer to:

- Very, the primary intensifier word in English

== Businesses ==
- The Very Group, a British retail/consumer finance corporation
  - Very (online retailer), their main e-commerce brand
- VERY TV, a Thai television channel

== Places ==
- Véry, a commune in Meuse department, France
- Very (lunar crater), on the Moon
- Very (Martian crater), on Mars

== Music ==
- Very (Pet Shop Boys album), 1993
- Very (Dreamscape album), 1999
- Very, an album by Miki Furukawa, 2010

== People ==
- Edward Wilson Very (1847–1910), US Navy officer, inventor of the Very flare gun
- Frank Washington Very (1852–1927), American astronomer
- Jones Very (1813–1880), American poet, essayist, clergyman and mystic
- Lydia Louisa Anna Very (1823–1901), American author and illustrator
- Pierre Véry (1900–1960), French novelist and screenwriter
- Very Idham Henyansyah (born 1978), Indonesian serial killer

== Other uses ==
- Very, the most common type of flare gun

== See also ==
- Vary (disambiguation)
- Vari (disambiguation)
- Verree, a given name and surname
- Verey, a surname
- Veri (disambiguation)
- Verri
- Verry
