= Veri =

Veri may refer to:

== People ==
- Joseph Alphonse de Véri (1724–1799), French abbot
- Leandro Verì (1903–1938), Italian carabiniere
- Rinaldo Veri (born 1952), Italian naval officer

== Places ==
- Jan Veri, Iran
- Veri, Azerbaijan, in Lerik District
- Veri, Spain

== See also ==
- Very (disambiguation)
- Verri
- Verry
