= Varis (disambiguation) =

Varis is a given name and surname.

Varis may also refer to:

- Varis, Grevena, Greek village
- Varis, a part of the ODP Corporation

== See also ==
- Vari (disambiguation)
- Waris (disambiguation)
- Waaris (disambiguation)
