= Verry =

Verry is a surname. Notable people with the surname include:

- George F. Verry (1826–1883), American politician
- Norm Verry (1922–1961), American football player and coach
- Ross Verry (born 1964), New Zealand cricketer

== See also ==
- McVerry
- Veri (disambiguation)
- Very (disambiguation)
- Verri
