= Babakuce =

Babakücə or Babaküçə or Babakucha may refer to:

- Babakücə, Azerbaijan
- Babaküçə, Azerbaijan
