= Voronin =

Voronin (Russian: Воронин), or Voronina (feminine: Воронина), is a Balto-Slavic last name, most commonly found in Belarus, Russia and Ukraine from Proto-Balto-Slavic word "warnás" meaning raven or crow. Other spelling variant of the name is Woronin (feminine; Woronina), and the Baltic variants of the last name are Vārnas, Voroņins and Varoņins. A similar last name can be found in Finnic countries in the form of Varonen or Vares. The last name is related to Rus/Baltic Sailors, Vikings and Ushkuyniks, because ravens were widely used to navigate the sea.

== People ==
- Aleksandr Voronin (1951-1992), a Russian olympic weightlifter
- Alexandra Voronin (1905-1993), first a wife of fascist leader of Norway, Vidkun Quisling
- Anatoly Voronin (1951–2006), business chief of Itar-TASS
- Andriy Voronin, a Ukrainian footballer
- Andrei Voronin (1900–1979), a Soviet army officer and Hero of the Soviet Union
- Inga Voronina, a Soviet speed skater (maiden name: Inga Artamonova)
- Irina Voronina, a Russian model
- Lev Voronin (1928–2006), a Soviet politician and post-Soviet banker
- Lev Voronin (handballer), a Russian team handball player
- Lola Voronina (b. 1983), Russian politician (PPRU) and co-chairperson of Pirate Parties International (PPI)
- Mikhail Voronin, Soviet gymnast who won two Olympic gold medals in 1968
- Mikhail Voronin (fashion designer), a Ukrainian fashion designer and businessman
- Mikhail Stepanovich Voronin (1838–1903), a Russian botanist
- Natalya Voronina (b. 1994), Russian speed skater
- Oleg Voronin, son of Vladimir Voronin
- Sergei Mikhailovitch Voronin (1946–1997), a Russian mathematician who specialized in number theory
- Serhiy Voronin, a Ukrainian footballer
- Valery Voronin, Soviet footballer, ranked Best Player of the USSR in 1964 & 1965
- Vladimir Voronin, former president of the Republic of Moldova (2001-2009)
- Vladimir Voronin (captain), Soviet Navy captain and polar explorer
- Vyacheslav Voronin, a Russian athlete
- Zinaida Voronina, a Soviet gymnast
- Marian Woronin, a Polish sprinter

== Places ==
- Voronina Island, a group of two islands in the Kara Sea.

== See also ==
- Yakov Kolokolnikov-Voronin
- Marian Woronin
