= Vari (disambiguation) =

Vari is a suburb of Athens, Greece.

Vary or Vári may also refer to:

- Vari, Iran, a village in Mazandaran Province, Iran
- Varima-te-takere, a goddess in Polynesian mythology
- Van Andel Research Institute (VARI), a biomedical research and education institute

People:

- Attila Vári (born 1976), Hungarian water polo player,
- Barnabás Vári (born 1987), Hungarian football player
- George Vari (1923–2010), Canadian real estate developer and philanthropist
- Giuseppe Vari (1924–1993), Italian filmmaker
- Gyula Vári (born 1967), Hungarian aviation officer and politician
- Martin Vari (born 1982), Argentine kitesurfer
- Minnette Vári (born 1968), South African artist
- Zsolt Vari (born 1969), Hungarian sport shooter

== See also ==
- Vary (disambiguation)
- Vary (surname)
- Varis, a given name and surname
