= Waris =

Waris may refer to:

== People ==
- Abdul Majeed Waris (born 1991), Ghanaian footballer
- Manmohan Waris (born 1967), Indian Punjabi folk/pop singer
- Ruqaiyyah Waris Maqsood (born 1942), British author
- Syed Mohammad Waris Hasan Naqvi (1932/33-2008), Indian Shia cleric
- Waris Ahluwalia (born 1974), Indian-American designer and actor
- Waris Ali Mirza (1901–1969), last Nawab of Murshidabad
- Waris Ali Shah (1819–1905), Indian saint
- Waris Baig (born 1965), Pakistani singer
- Waris Dirie (born 1965), Somali model, author, actress and human rights activist
- Waris Hussein (born 1938), British-Indian television and film director
- Waris Shah (1722–1798), Punjabi poet, best known for his epic poem based on the folklore of Heer Ranjha

== Other uses ==
- "Ajj Aakhaan Waris Shah Nu", Punjabi-language poem about the partition of India by Indian writer and poet Amrita Pritam
- Kot Waris, Pakistani village
- Waris (serial), a 1979 Pakistani television drama serial broadcast on PTV
- Waris Jari Hantu, 2007 Malaysian horror film
- Waris language, Papuan language
- Waris (1969 film) an Indian Hindi-language drama film by Rammanna, starring Jeetendra and Hema Malini
- Waris (1954 film), an Indian Hindi-language film directed by Nitin Bose
- Waris Shah: Ishq Daa Waaris, a 2006 Indian Punjabi-language biographical film about the poet Waris Shah

== See also ==
- Waaris (disambiguation)
- Wari (disambiguation)
- Varis (disambiguation)
