= Verri =

Verri is an Italian surname. Notable people with the surname include:

- Alessandro Verri (1741–1816), Italian author
- Carlos Caetano Bledorn Verri (born 1963), Brazilian footballer and football manager better known as Dunga
- Francesco Verri (1885–1945), Italian track cycling racer
- Pietro Verri (1728–1797), Italian philosopher, economist, historian and writer
- members of the house Verri della Bosia:
  - Karl Graf Verri della Bosia (1790–1878), Bavarian general
  - Maximilian Graf von Verri della Bosia (1824–1909), Bavarian general

== Other uses ==
- Verri, Albania, a village in Shëngjergj municipality, Tirana County, Albania

== See also ==
- Veri (disambiguation)
- Very (disambiguation)
- Verry
