= Vares =

Vares may refer to:

== Geography ==
- Vareš, a town and municipality in central Bosnia and Herzegovina
- Varès, a commune in south-western France
- Varés, a city in Lombardy
- Vareš Lake, an artificial lake of Bosnia and Herzegovina
- Sang-e Vares, a village in northern Iran

== Fiction ==
- Vares (series), a novel series by Reijo Mäki that has been made into a film series
  - Jussi Vares, a fictional Finnish private detective and the antihero of the series
- Vares: Private Eye (Finnish: Vares – yksityisetsivä), the first installment in the Vares film series
- The Kiss of Evil (Finnish: Vares – Pahan suudelma), the third installment in the Vares film series

== Other ==
- Vares (surname)
