= Vary =

Vary may refer to:

- Variation
- Vary, Perm Krai, a village in Bolshesosnovsky District, Perm Krai, Russia
- Vary (surname), including people with the name
- Vary, Zakarpattia Oblast, a village in Berehove Raion, Zakarpattia Oblast, Ukraine
- Vary, an HTTP header field

== See also ==
- Varys, a character in A Song of Ice and Fire and Game of Thrones
- Very
