= Waaris =

Waaris may refer to:

- Waaris (1954 film), a 1954 Indian Hindi-language drama film by Nitin Bose and music by Anil Biswas, starring Suraiya and Talat Mahmood
- Waaris (1988 film), a 1988 Indian Hindi-language drama film by Ravindra Peepat, starting Smita Patil
- Waris Shah: Ishq Daa Waaris, a 2006 Indian Punjabi-language biographical film about the poet Waris Shah; an official entry of India for the Academy Awards
- Waaris (2016 TV series), a 2016 Indian television series
- Waaris (2008 Zee TV series), a 2008 Indian television drama series broadcast on Zee TV
- Waaris (1999 Zee TV series), a 1999 Indian television series broadcast on Zee TV
- Waris (TV series), a 1980s Pakistani television drama series broadcast on PTV
- Waarish, 2004 Indian Bengali-language film by Kaushik Ganguly
- Waris Shah, a Punjabi Sufi poet, best known for his tragic romance Heer Ranjha based on a local folklore

== See also ==
- Waris (disambiguation)
- Varis (disambiguation)
