= Axunahiran =

Village in Lerik District, Azerbaijan

- Village
- Location in Azerbaijan
- Coordinates: 38°40′52″N 48°31′04″E
- Country: Azerbaijan
- Economic region: Lankaran-Astara Economic Region
- District: Lerik District
- Municipality: Veri, Azerbaijan

Axunahiran is a village in the municipality of Veri in the Lerik District of Azerbaijan.
