= Graham Burnett =

New Zealand cricketer (born 1965)

Personal information
- Full name: Graham Peter Burnett
- Born: 7 October 1965 (age 61); Tauranga, New Zealand
- Batting: Right-handed
- Bowling: Right-arm medium

Domestic team information
- Years: Team
- 1987/88–1992/93: Wellington
- 1993/94–1994/95: Northern Districts

Career statistics
| Competition | First-class | List A |
|---|---|---|
| Matches | 60 | 57 |
| Runs scored | 2,960 | 1,446 |
| Batting average | 31.48 | 28.92 |
| 100s/50s | 2/18 | 2/6 |
| Top score | 203* | 102* |
| Balls bowled | 84 | – |
| Wickets | 1 | – |
| Bowling average | 46.00 | – |
| 5 wickets in innings | 0 | – |
| 10 wickets in match | 0 | – |
| Best bowling | 1/46 | – |
| Catches/stumpings | 45/– | 13/– |
- Source: Cricinfo, 16 February 2010

Graham Peter Burnett (born 7 October 1965) is a New Zealand former cricketer who played for Wellington and the Northern Districts. Burnett played from the 1987–88 season until the 1994–95 season. He was born at Tauranga in 1965.

In the 1991–92 he and Ross Verry added 346 against Northern Districts for the third wicket at Seddon Park, Hamilton. As of 2010, this remains a record for all partnerships by Wellington.
