= Louis Prang =

American printer, lithographer and publisher (1824–1909)

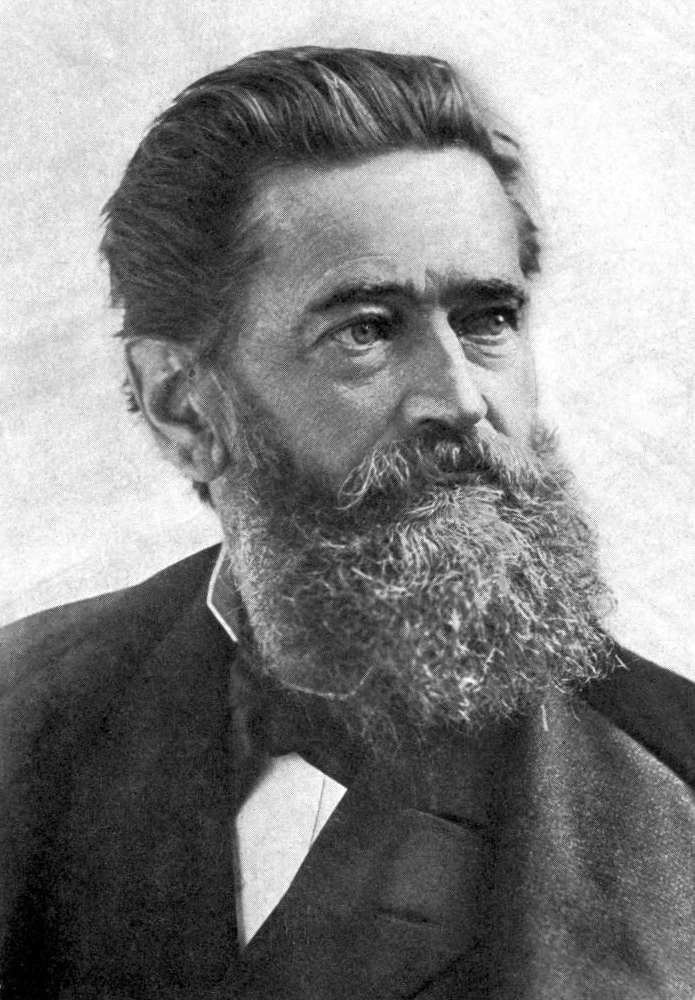
- Louis Prang
- Born: March 12, 1824; Breslau, Prussia
- Died: June 15, 1909 (aged 85); Los Angeles, California, U.S.
- Known for: Printing, lithography, publishing
- Spouses: Rosa Gerber, Mary Dana Hicks

Louis Prang (March 12, 1824 – June 15, 1909) was an American printer, lithographer, publisher, and Georgist. He is sometimes known as the "father of the American Christmas card".

== Youth ==
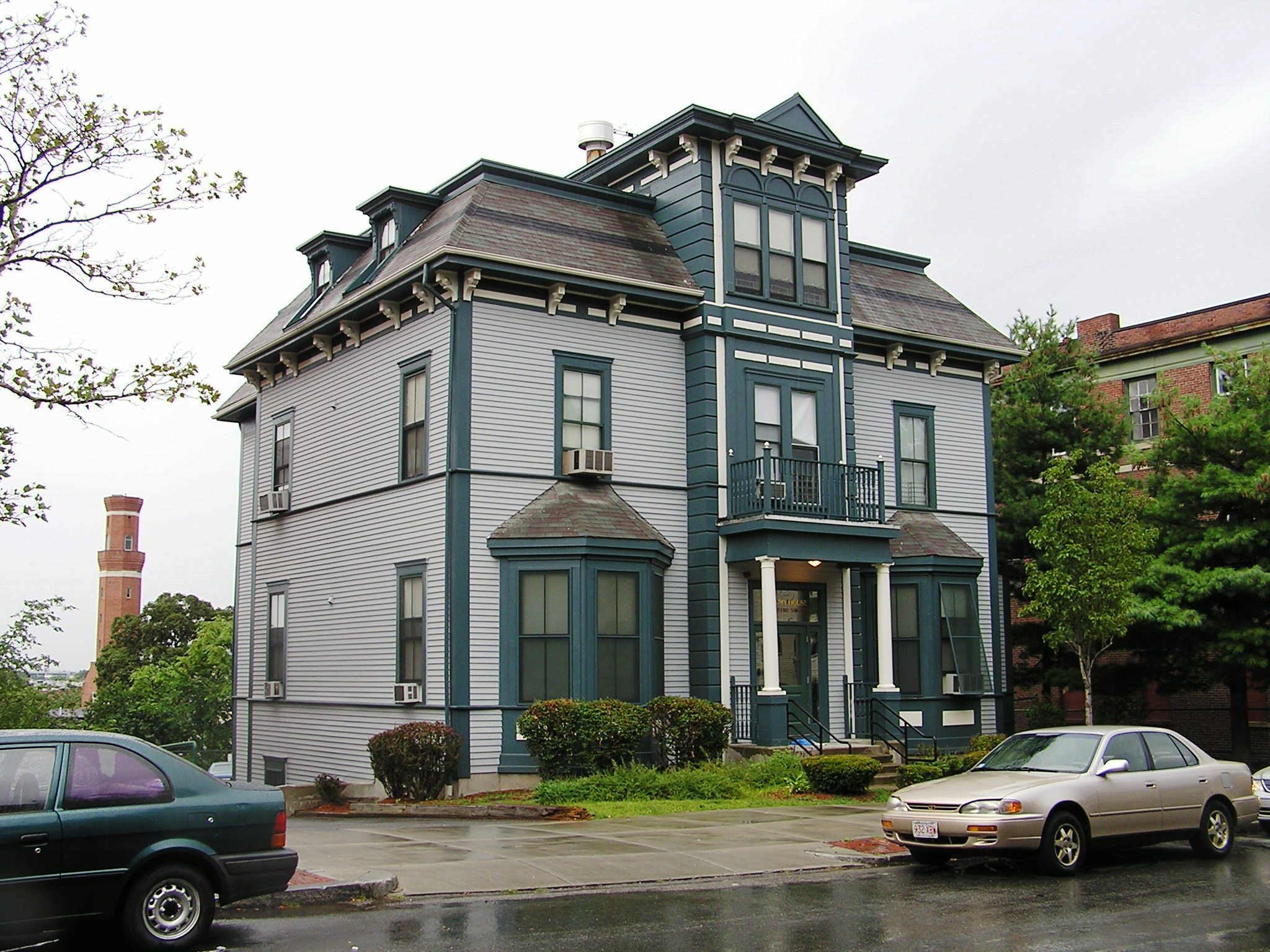
Louis Prang House, Roxbury, Boston, Massachusetts

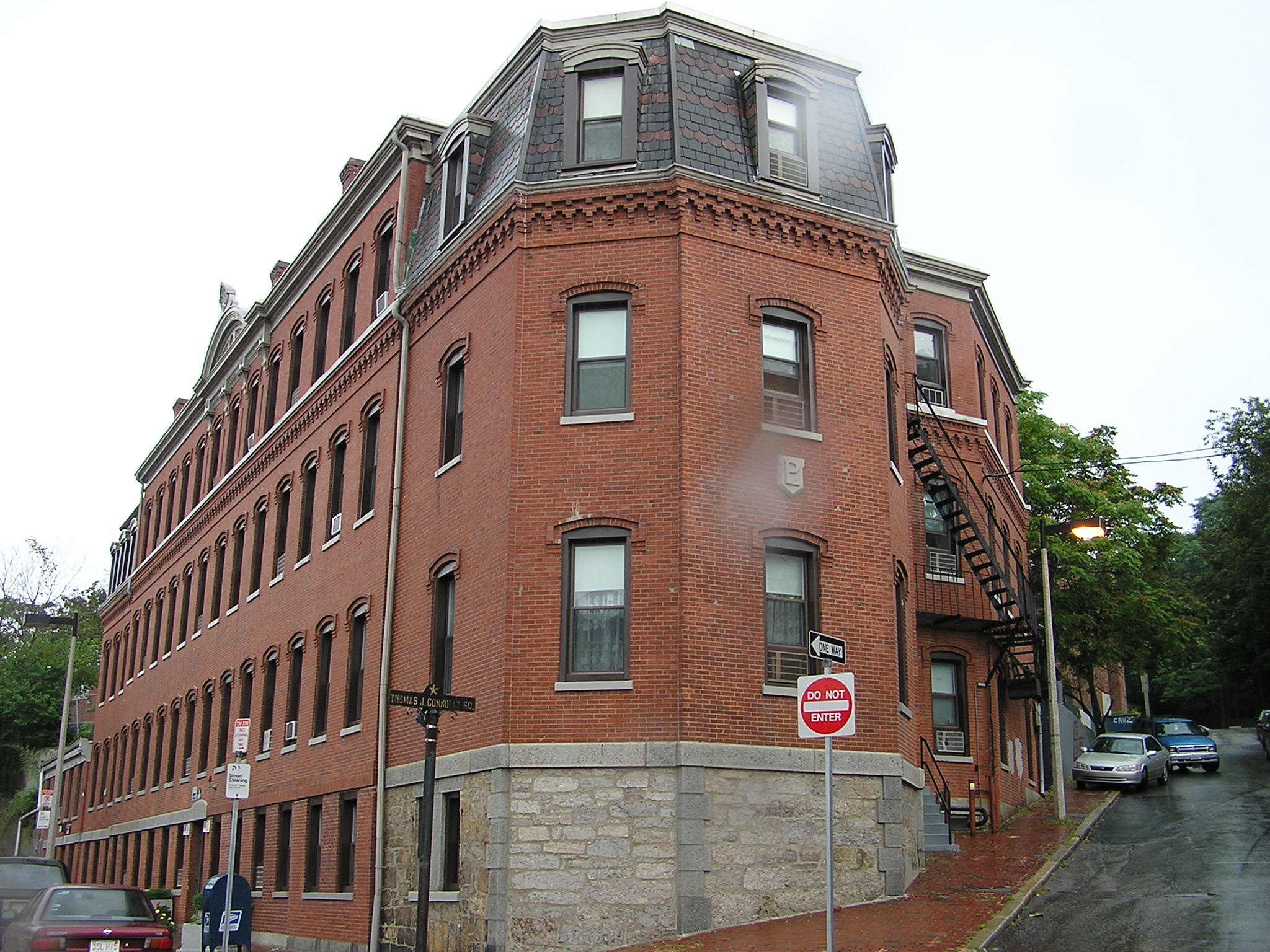
Louis Prang Factory, Roxbury, Boston, Massachusetts

Prang was born in Breslau in Prussian Silesia. His father Jonas Louis Prang was a textile manufacturer and of French Huguenot origin; his mother, Rosina Silverman, was German. Because of health problems as a boy, Prang was unable to receive much standard schooling and became an apprentice to his father, learning engraving, calico dyeing and printing. In the early 1840s, Prang travelled around Bohemia working in textiles, as well in Hagen, Westphalia studying the chemistry of printing. After some travel in Europe, he became involved in revolutionary activities in 1848. Pursued by the Prussian government, he went to Switzerland and in 1850 emigrated to the United States, settling in Boston, Massachusetts.

== Early work ==
Prang's early activities in the US publishing architectural books and making leather goods were not very successful, and he began to make wood engravings for illustrations in books. In 1851 he worked for Frank Leslie, art director for Gleason's Pictorial Drawing-Room Companion, and later with John Andrew of John Andrew & Son. These professional experiences put him in a position to create Prang & Mayer.

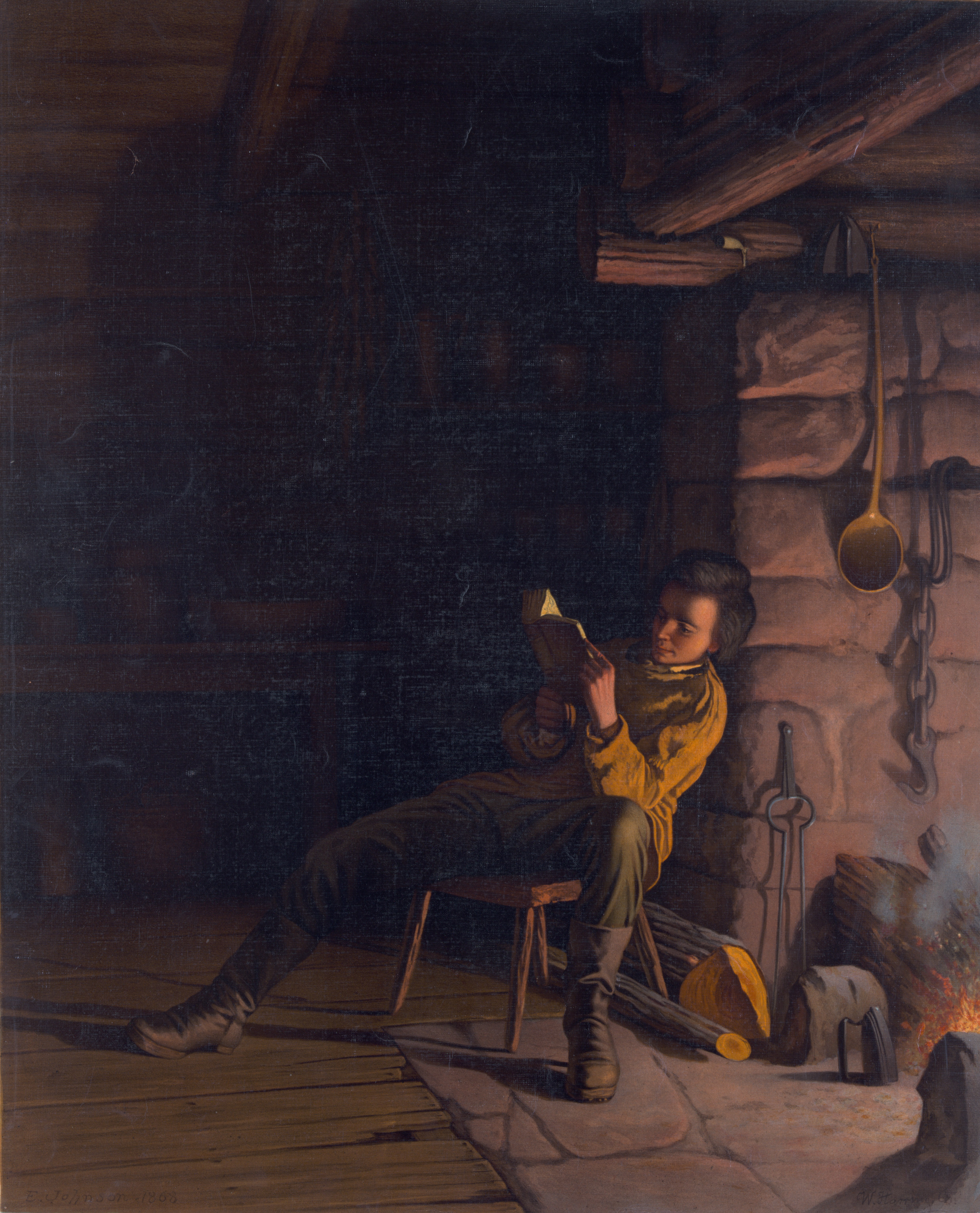
Lincoln as a boy, reading at night, by Eastman Johnson

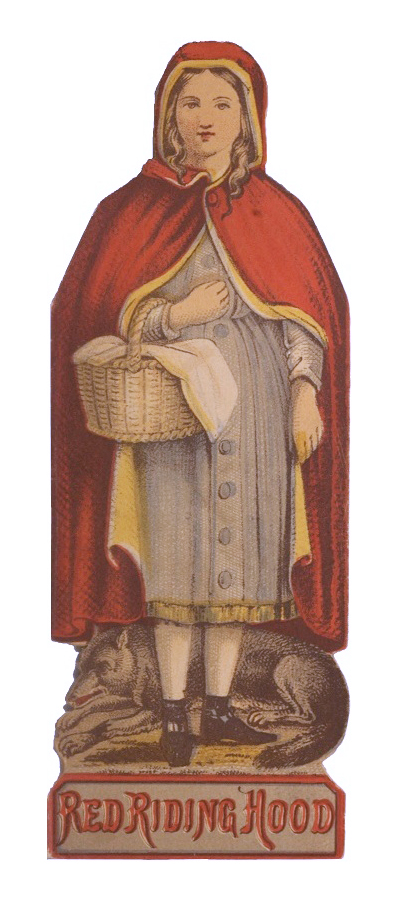
Cover of Lydia Very's verse version of Red Riding Hood (1863), one of a series of shaped die-cut books issued by Prang

== Lithography and career ==
In 1856, Prang and Julius Mayer created a press, Prang and Mayer, to produce lithographs and copperplates. The company specialized in prints of buildings and towns in Massachusetts. In 1860, he bought out his partner, creating L. Prang & Company and began working to create album cards as well as Civil War maps and illustrations. Prang used numerous stones to produce each of his works, unlike his contemporaries. Between his use of materials, particular methodology and significant time commitment to his work, he was able to deliver an unprecedented level of quality, which resulted in the firm's ultimate success.

The company's success also depended on its production of Civil War imagery. Following the events that look place at Fort Sumter, Prang set out to capitalize demand for war imagery. No one had previously created and distributed war maps in America, but less than a day after receiving news of the attack, Prang had crafted maps of Charleston Harbor and passed them out them to all the newsstands in the city. He continued producing maps throughout the war as the public became progressively more engrossed in the details of the fighting.

Prang's success producing war maps allowed him to amass the necessary funds to return to Europe and learn about new developments in German lithography in 1864. Returning the next year, he began to create high-quality reproductions of major artworks to promote education in the arts. His ability to create such high-quality and accurate copies made him very popular, but also sparked a degree of controversy. Some praised Prang for making art more affordable, while others claimed he was detracting value from the original.

Prang also began creating series of popular album cards, advertised to be collected in scrapbooks, showing natural scenes and patriotic symbols. At Christmas 1873, Prang began creating greeting cards for the popular market in England and began selling the Christmas card in America in 1874; he is sometimes called the "father of the American Christmas card."

Prang was an active supporter of female artists, both commissioning and collecting artworks by women. Many of his lithographs featured works by female artists, such as the botanical illustration of Ellen Thayer Fisher. In 1881, his company employed more than one hundred women.

In June 1886, Prang published a series of prints under the title Prang's War Pictures: Aquarelle Facsimile Prints, aiming to portray the details of the war in such a way that was both accurate and appealing to the public. Prang was dedicated to using his art to educate and inspire others, so each print was accompanied by text detailing the historical details of the battle portrayed, as well as firsthand accounts of what occurred, many of which came directly from soldiers. This offered readers multiple avenues through which they could learn about and comprehend the magnitude of what transpired, and the series became very popular. They also helped inspire a genre of such prints, particularly the series issued by Kurz and Allison. However, Prang aimed at a more modern and individual treatment, as opposed to the panoramic style of Kurz and Allison, and before them, Currier and Ives.

In 1897, L. Prang & Company merged with the Taber Art Company of New Bedford, Massachusetts, creating the Taber-Prang Company and moved to Springfield, Massachusetts.

Prang, the art supply brand that he founded, is now owned by Dixon Ticonderoga.

Prang died of pleuropneumonia on June 15, 1909, at the Glendale Sanitarium in Los Angeles. He is buried in Forest Hills Cemetery in Jamaica Plain, Massachusetts.

== Louie Awards ==
Since 1988, the Greeting Card Association, the trade association representing the greeting card industry in the US, has held an annual award ceremony for the best greeting cards published that year. The awards are called Louies in recognition of Louis Prang. The most successful winner of Louie Awards is Up With Paper - the original pop-up greeting card company.

As of 2023, Up With Paper has won over 100 coveted Awards.

== Personal life ==
On November 1, 1851, Prang married Rosa Gerber of Bern, Switzerland. Gerber assisted Prang in his movement from wood engravings to high quality book illustrations. Their union encouraged him to begin seeking avenues to popularize his art in America. She died on June 2, 1898, and on April 15, 1900, he married Mary Dana Hicks.

The Prangs became close with the family of neighbor Karl Heinzen following the marriage of Prang and Gerber. Heinzen was a journalist with known radical views, many of which he shared with personal friend Karl Marx. Prang did his best to remain unaffiliated with the image Heinzen projected in the interest of succeeding in the world of business. Prang's only child, Rosa Prang, married Heinzen's son Karl. Prang often supported Heinzen both financially and in the face of public criticism the latter faced, particularly from other Germans in the Boston area.

== Lithographs ==
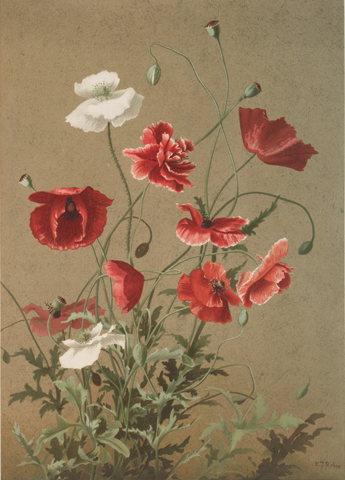
Poppies, 1885

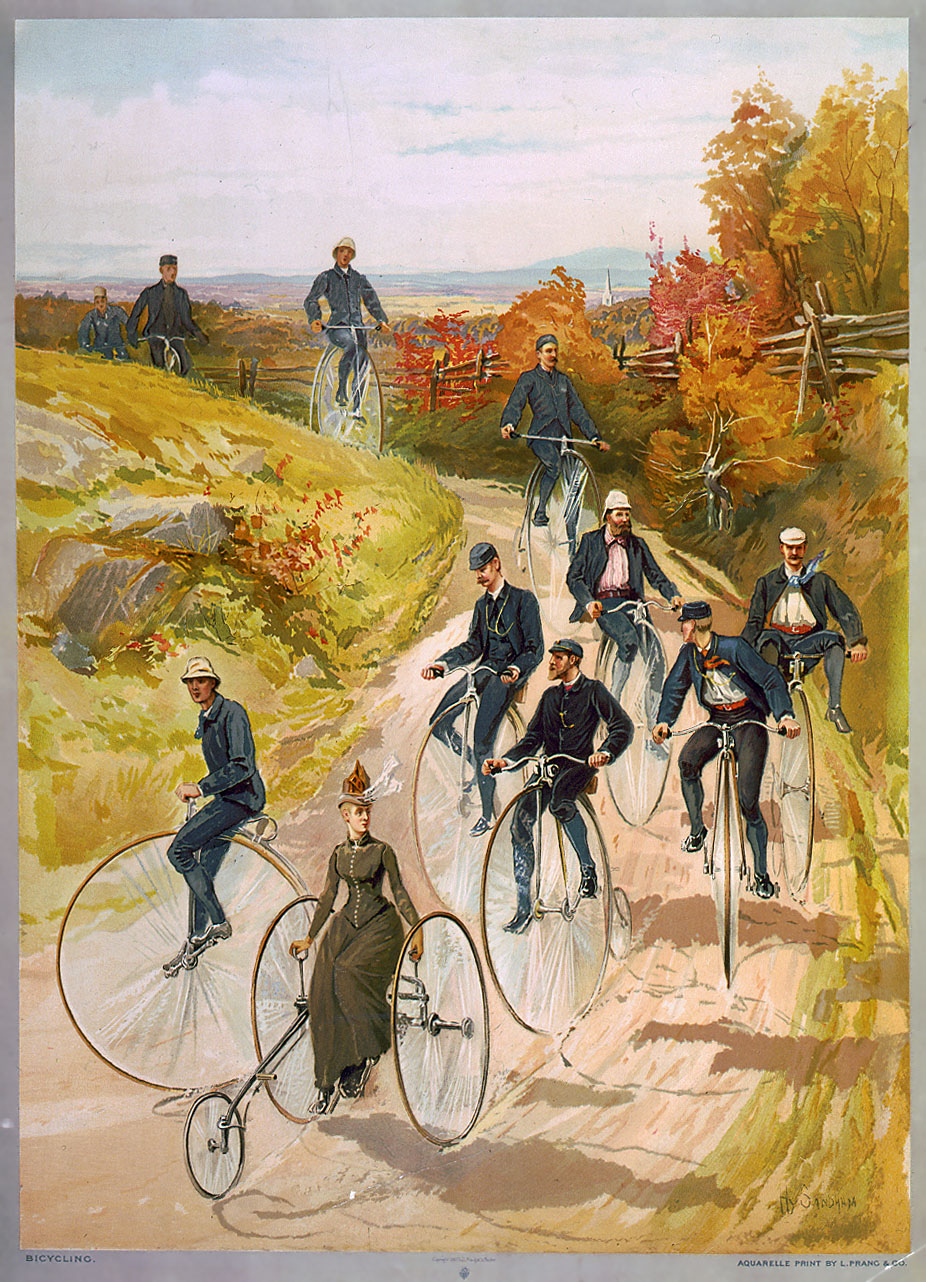
Bicycling

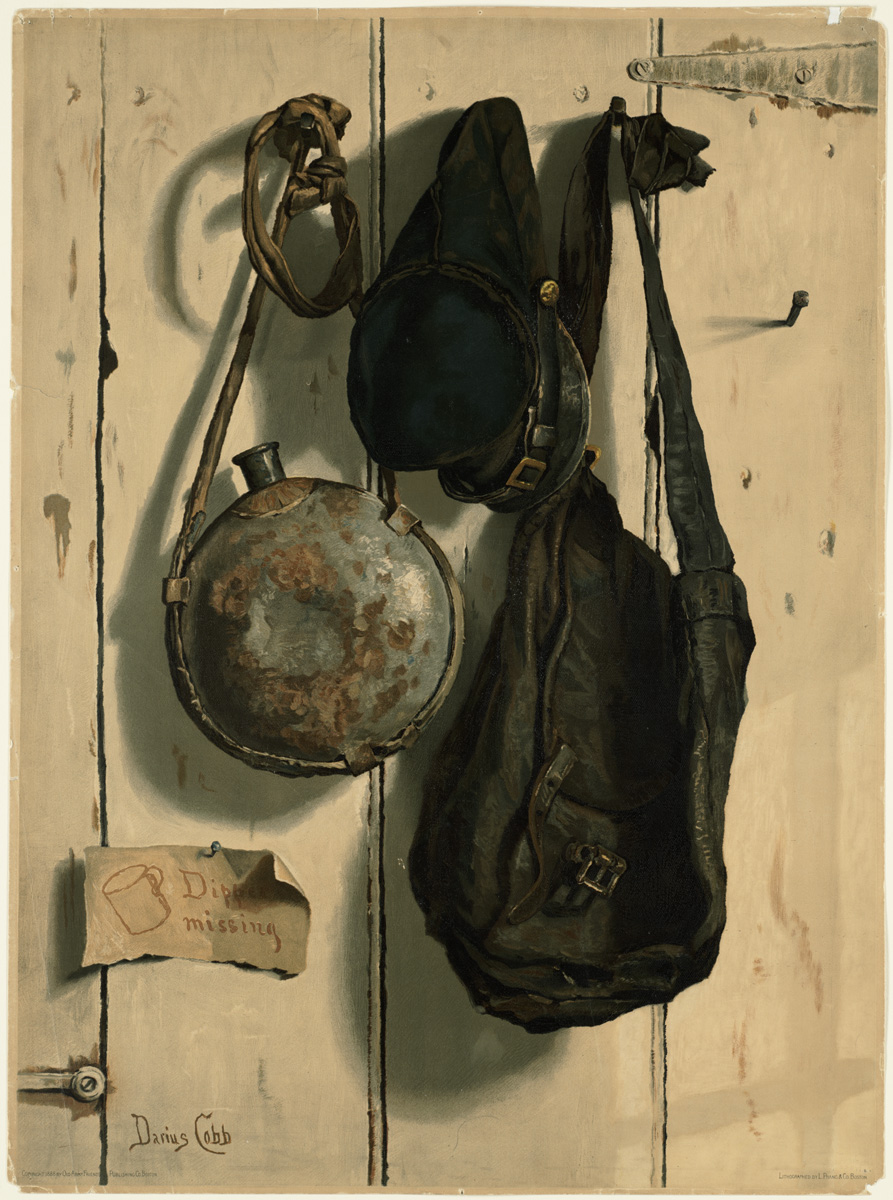
Civil War trompe l'oeil

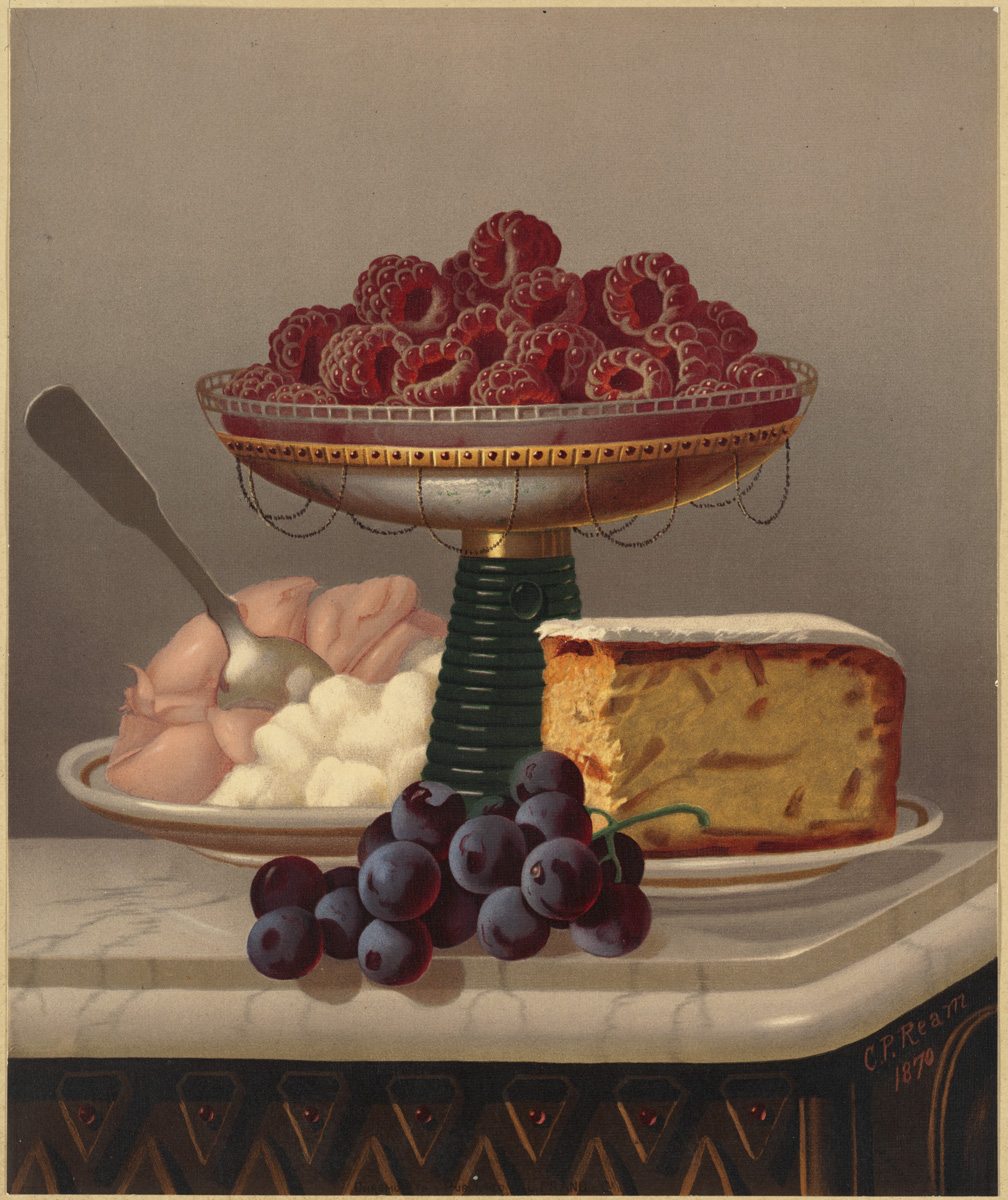
Dessert No. 4

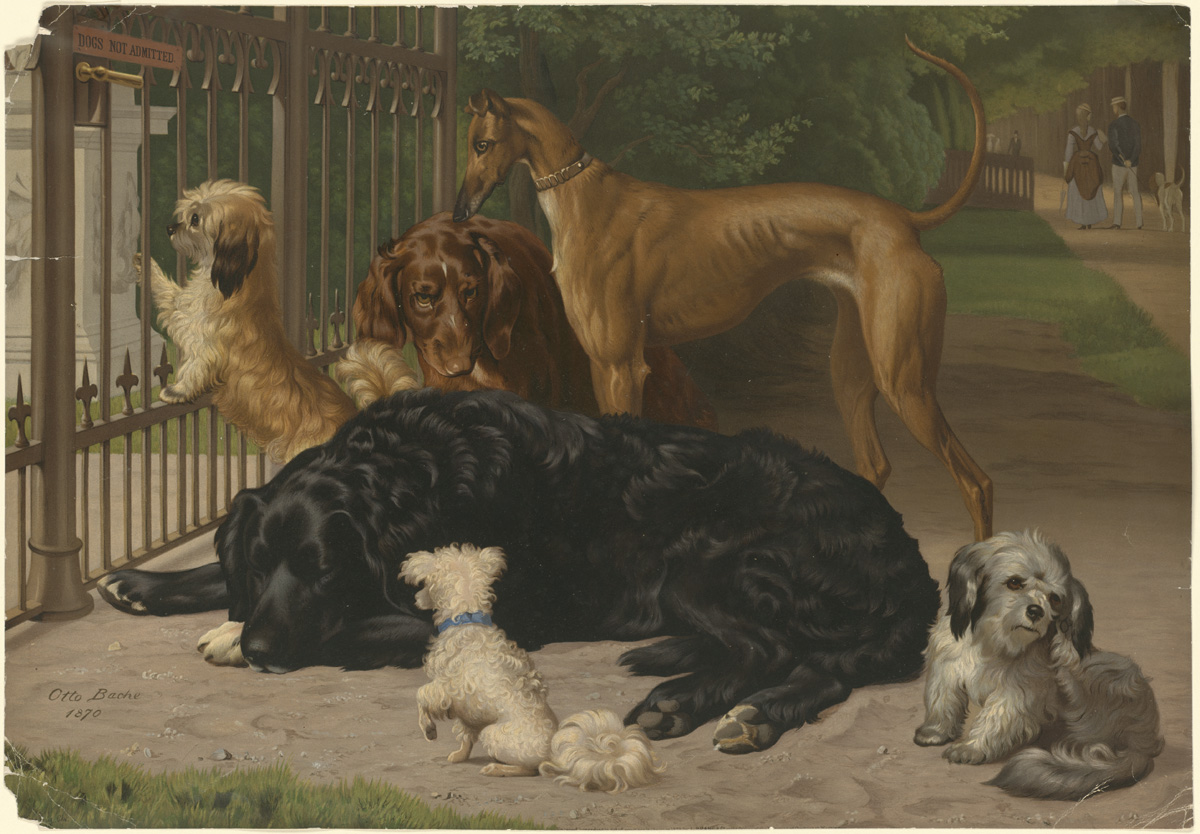
Dogs Not Admitted

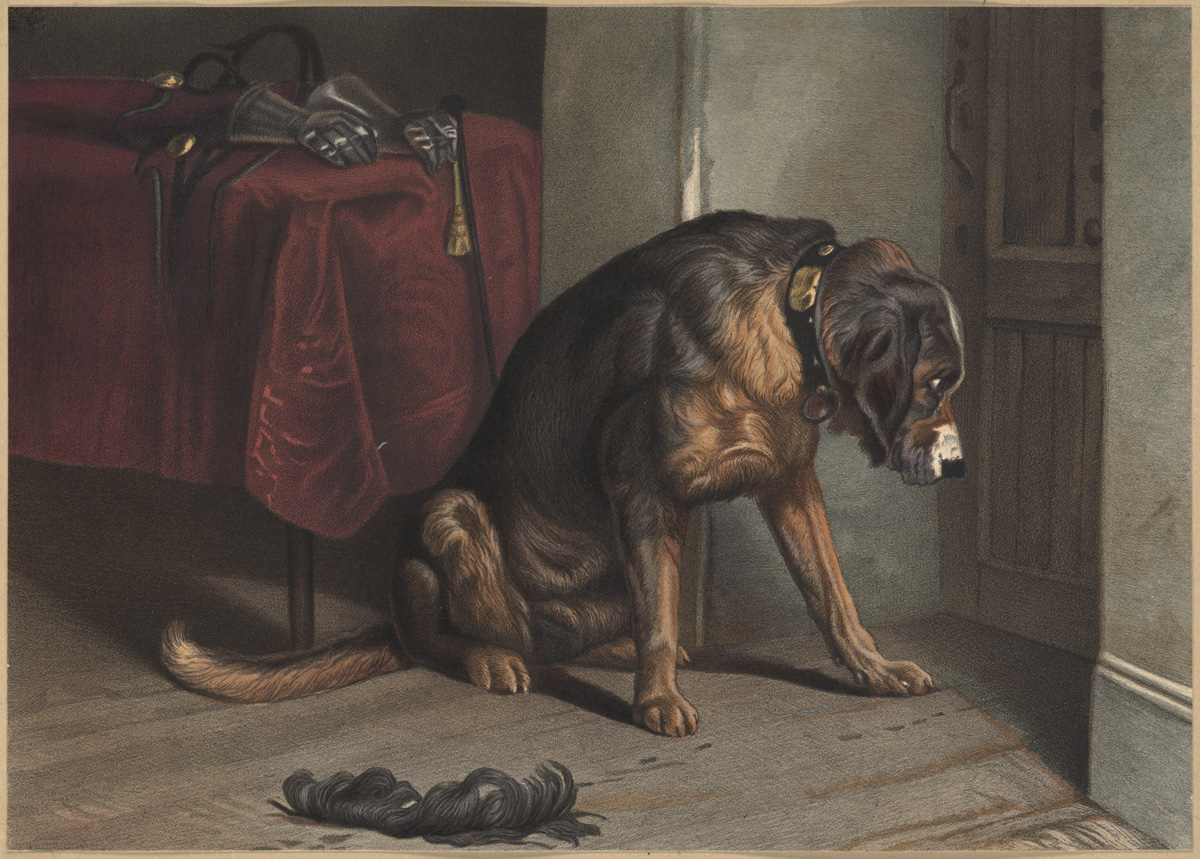
A Friend in Suspense, (Boston Public Library)

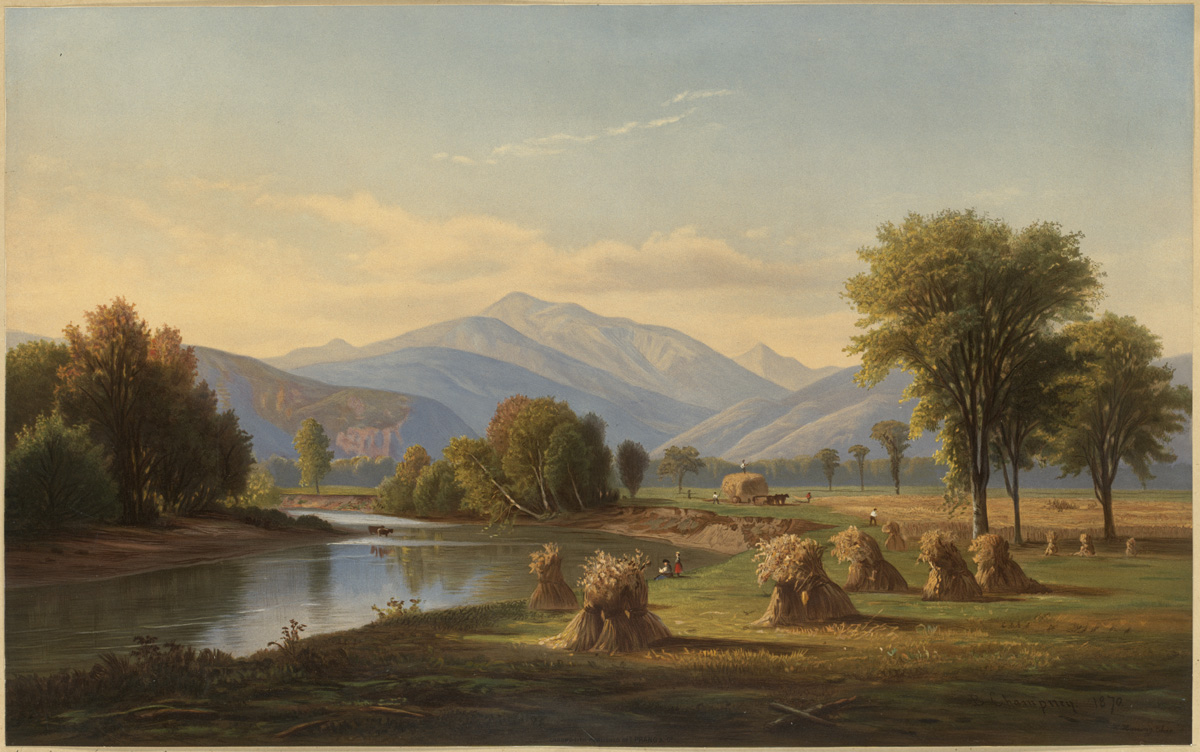
North Conway Meadows

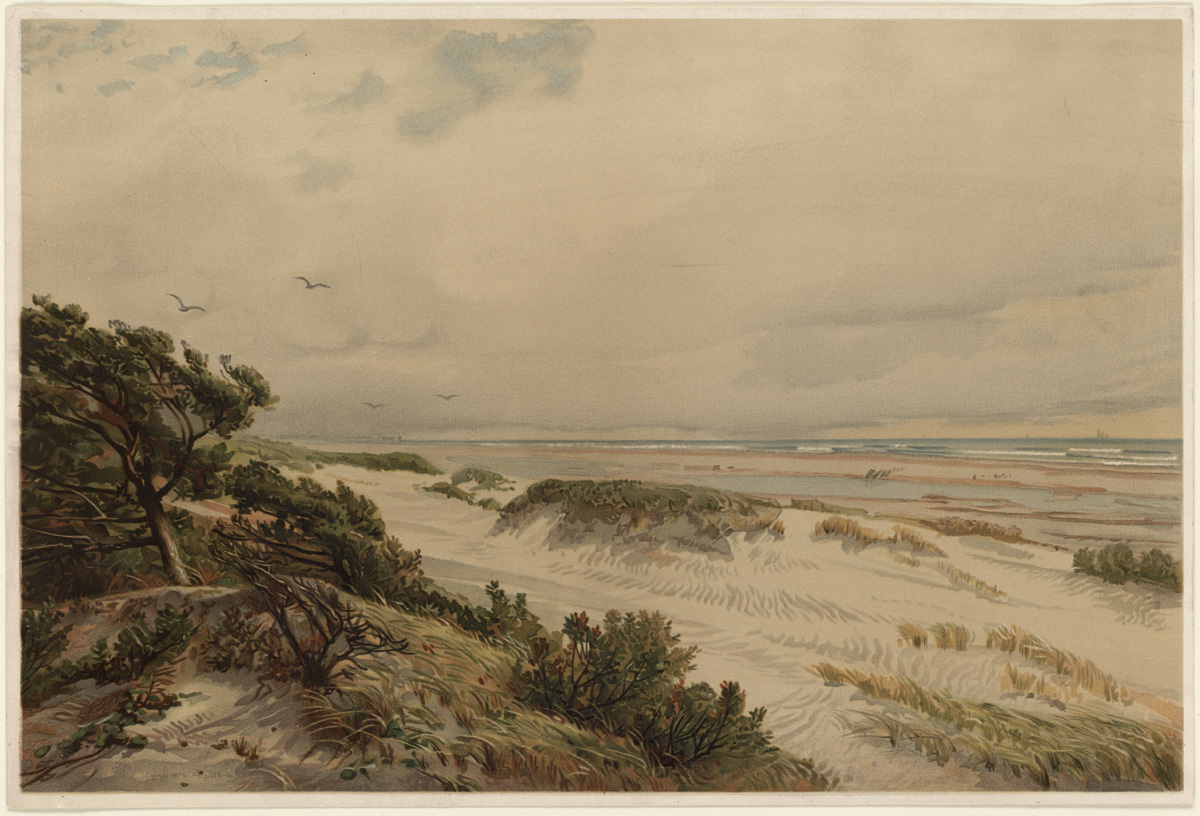
Beach Scene

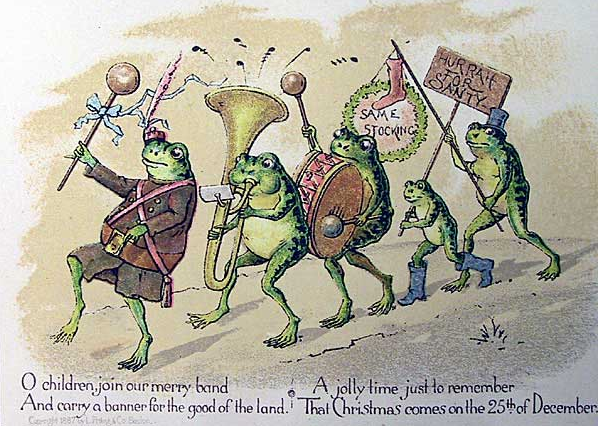
Christmas card by Louis Prang, showing a group of anthropomorphized frogs parading with banner and band.

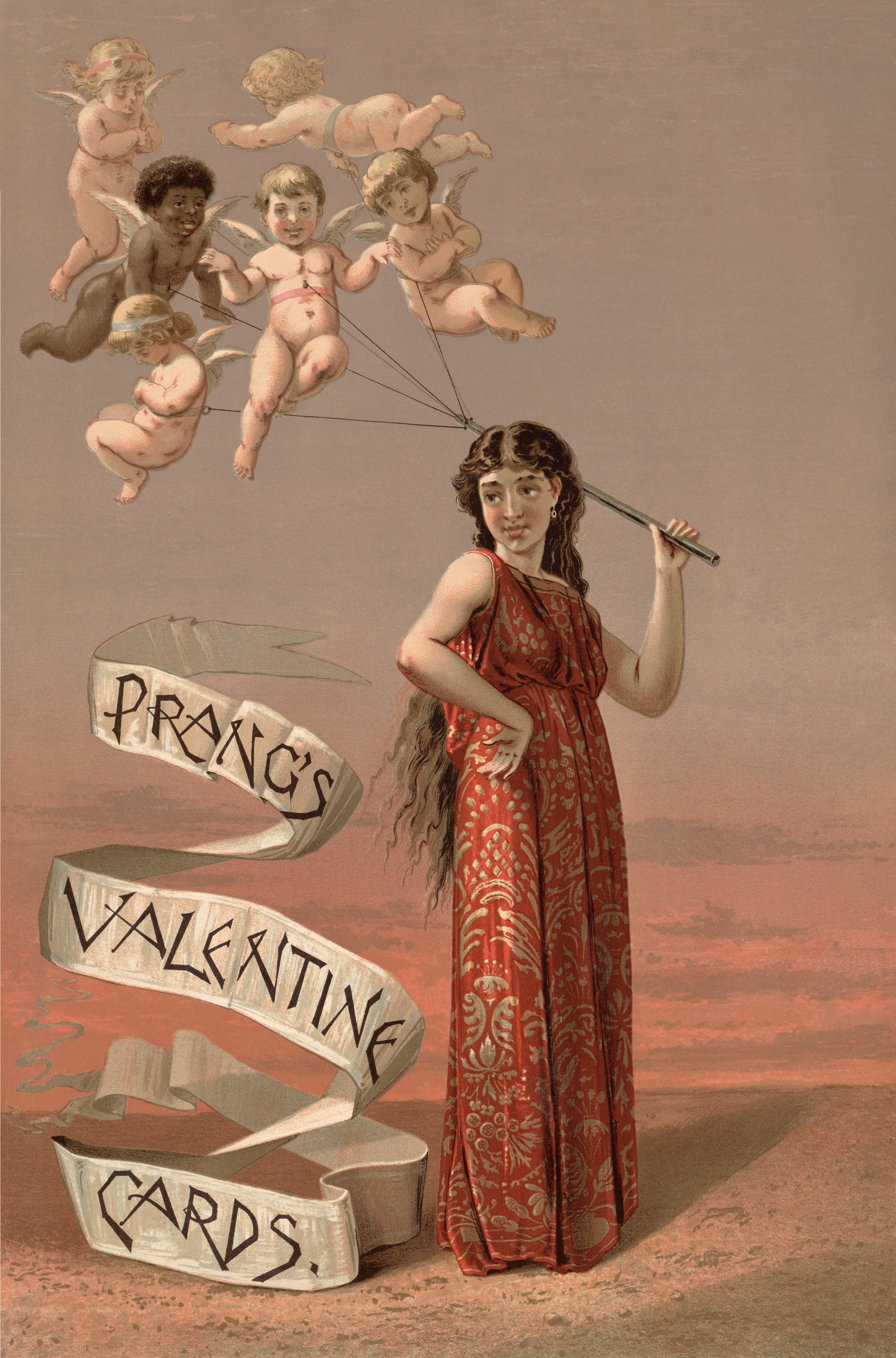
"Prang's Valentine cards" 1883 advertisement for L. Prang & Co., digitally restored.

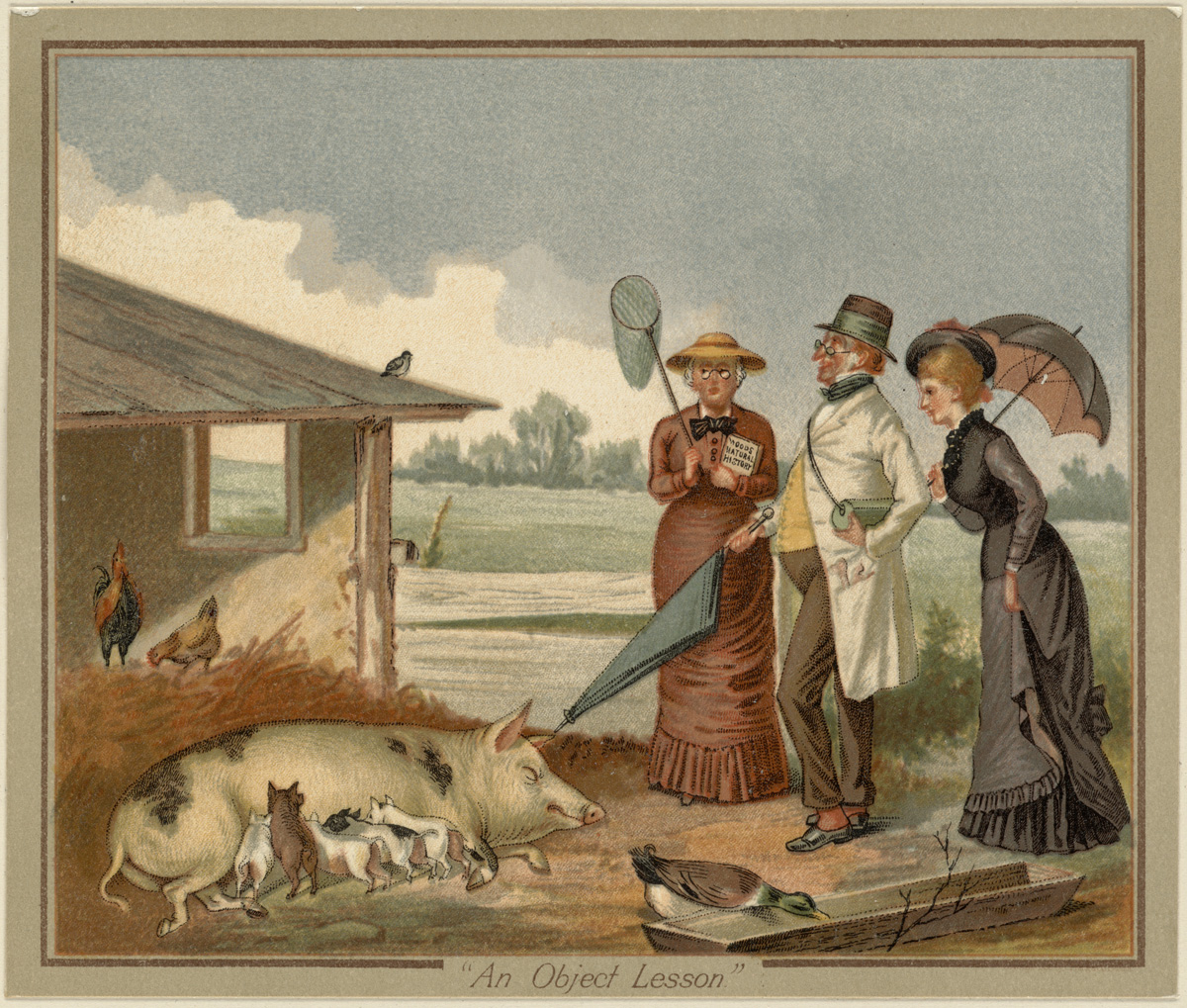
An Object Lesson (Boston Public Library)

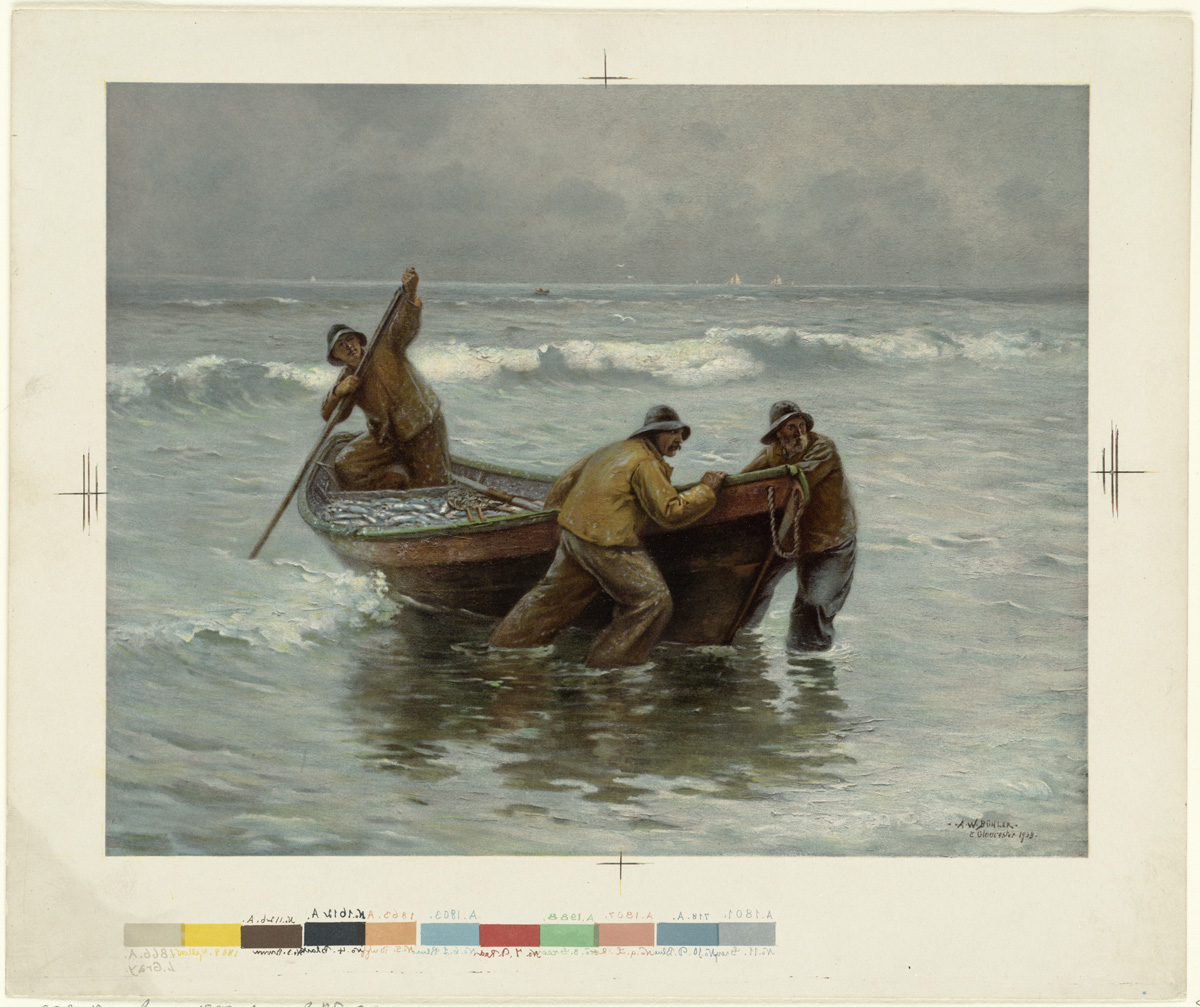
Fisherman bringing in their catch

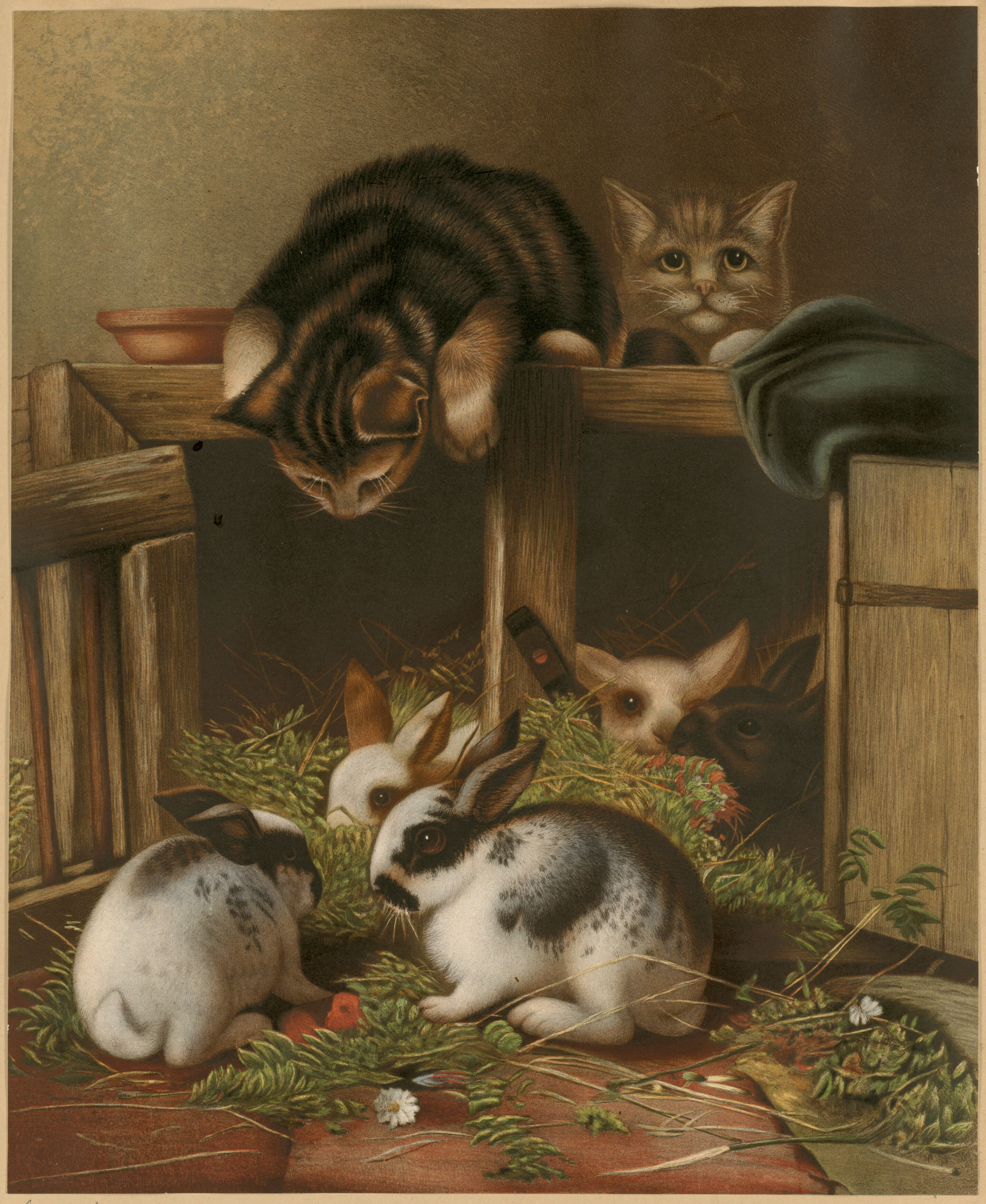
Rabbits and cats, ca. 1861–1897; from the Louis Prang & Company Collection of the Boston Public Library
