= Mary Dana Hicks =

American art educator

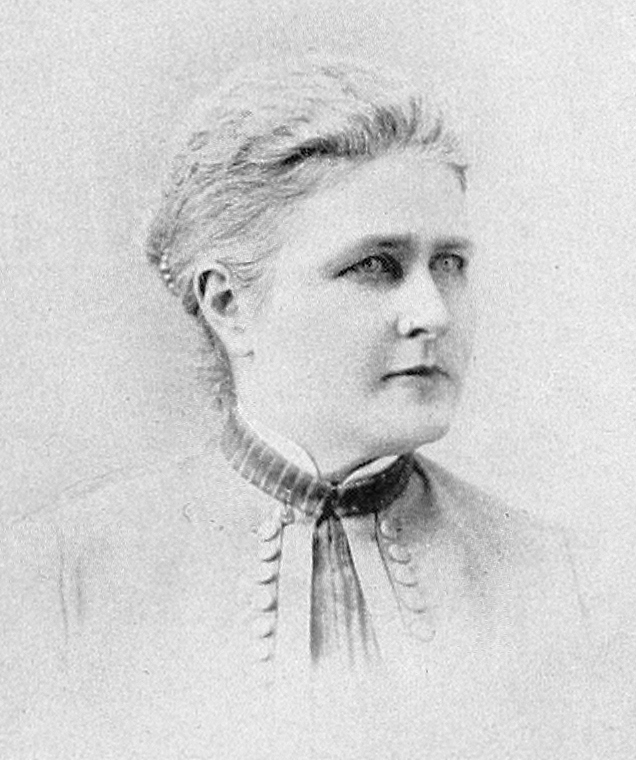
Mary Dana Hicks, "A Woman of the Century"

Mary Dana Hicks (née Mary Dana; at second marriage, Mary Dana Hicks Prang; 7 October 1836 – 7 November 1927) was an American art educator from the U.S. state of New York.

She was largely instrumental in founding the Social Art Club of Syracuse, New York. Hicks appeared before the Woman's Congress in 1875 and 1876, urging that the subject of art education should be promoted by associations for study similar to the Social Art Club and Portfolio Club of Syracuse, and that public exhibitions, loan exhibitions and museums should be established. She urged the matter through art and educational journals. In 1879, she was called to Boston to assist in the Prang art educational work in the public schools. Hicks brought to the art educational movement exceptional qualifications for directorship. She had received not only technical art training, but she had also studied the history and literature of art. As the art educational movement has developed throughout the country, Hicks was recognized as one of the leaders. She was deeply interested in the kindergarten and industrial movements in education, and did much to bring them into harmony with art teaching in the public schools. She was one of the pioneers in summer school teaching.

== Early years and education ==
Mary Amelia Dana was born in Syracuse, October 7, 1836, daughter of Major and Agnes A. (Johnson) Dana. The Dana family had a record in New England of over 250 years, its immigrant progenitor, Richard Dana, having come to this country in 1640, and settled in Cambridge, Massachusetts. From him, the line continued through Daniel,2 Thomas,3 Daniel,4 Daniel,5 to Major Dana, who was of the sixth generation, Mary Dana being of the seventh. Major father was a merchant who supported forward movements. Her mother, Agnes, a poet and artist, was a leader in the literary society of Syracuse; she lived to the age of 94 years.

At the age of two years, Hicks had learned the alphabet from large handbills. For some time, she was a pupil in a private school close to her home. Throughout her school life, she was found equal to children three or four years older. She was graduated from the Allen Seminary, Rochester, New York, in 1852, after a course of study in mathematics, the languages, and history, with general study of the sciences; and later she pursued special studies at Harvard University and at the Museum of Fine Arts, Boston.

On her 20th birthday, 7 October 1856, she married Charles Spencer Hicks, a promising young lawyer of Syracuse. In less than two years, her husband was drowned.

== Art educator ==
In 1858, Hicks faced financial troubles while needing to raise a young daughter. She starting teaching private pupils, most in drawing. Her work with these pupils led her to consider the influence of art instruction on education. Drawing was commonly regarded as an end to be attained only by the specially gifted. Close study and wide observation confirmed her in the belief that drawing should be a study not for the few only, but for all, a means of expression for every child, and therefore should be an integral part of public school education. Receiving the appointment of supervisor of drawing in the public schools of Syracuse, she visited several of the larger cities in the country, to observe school conditions. She found that drawing had a place in nearly every course of study, but that there was actually very little work of merit accomplished. More favorable conditions existed in Boston than elsewhere, but even there, drawing was not given the prominence to which she believed it was entitled.

About this time Walter Smith was called to Massachusetts to become the head of art education in the State. He established the Normal School in Boston (now Boston State College), and gave considerable impetus to the study of art. Hicks visited him in Boston, and, introducing his books in Syracuse, found them helpful in the study of historic ornament, supplying in some measure the examples necessary for her work. Several of her classes in the high school numbered seventy or eighty pupils each.

In order that the children might be properly taught, she formed teachers' classes that were conducted after school hours. In addition, she closely supervised the work in all the schools, ready to help the teachers with suggestions and encouragement. Her supervision of the schools of Syracuse extended over more than 10 years. Exhibitions of public school drawings were held at the high school building. These exhibitions, together with exhibitions made at the State Teachers' Association and at the Centennial Exposition in Philadelphia in 1876, were all factors in the progress of art education in the public schools. In Syracuse, they attracted the attention of broad-minded people, and comprehensive reports upon them were made by physicians, architects, and other people of education, among whom were Dr. Martin B. Anderson, President of University of Rochester, and Dr. Andrew Dickson White, President of Cornell University.

Endeavoring to spread the influence of art, Hicks assisted largely in the development of the Social Art Club of Syracuse, the purpose of which was the reading of the history of art and the study of historic and current art. Hicks was president of the club for five years, and through her efforts, its members were able to gather illustrations and to pursue a systematic course of reading relating to ancient, early Christian, and modern art. The club was popular, the waiting list being filled with names of women of high social standing. The Social Art Club was the second club formed in Syracuse, being antedated only by the Portfolio Club, an association of Hicks's pupils.

=== Prang Educational Company ===
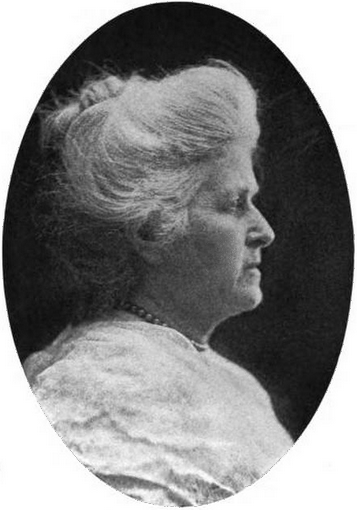
Mary Dana Hicks Prang

From the beginning of Hicks's connection with the Prang Educational Company in 1878, she was adviser on all the educational phases of the work. Even before her name appeared as joint author of the various publications prepared by the company, all questions involving educational influence and value were brought to her for judgment and advice. Her experience and insight as to the needs of the teachers contributed largely toward making possible the wide introduction of the Prang work in the public schools of the country. Her wisdom helped to make the Prang work acceptable to the educator.

Hicks was among the first to point out that the instruction in art given in the public schools should cover entirely different ground from that given in the art schools and studios. She taught clearly the difference in the purpose of the two -— the one being intended for those specially gifted by nature, while the other means the development of art expression in every child. Advocating these views, she was a frequent speaker at art and educational associations. The difficulties attending the introduction of a comparatively new work and the lack of public school training on the part of supervisors led them to seek frequent conferences with Hicks, and many supervisors submitted to her criticism outlines for work in their schools before giving the work to teachers and pupils. With the need of closer and more systematic instruction for teachers and supervisors becoming apparent, the Prang normal art classes for home study in form, drawing, and color, with instruction by correspondence, were organized in 1887. They were designed to assist public school teachers in preparing themselves to teach the subjects of form, drawing, and color. The advantages of these classes were quickly seized upon by hundreds of teachers in all grades, by principals of schools, and by supervisors.

On April 15, 1900, she married Louis Prang (1924–1909), of Boston, the art publisher. After his death in 1909, Hicks and her step-daughter, Rosa, moved in together, and Hicks studied at Radcliffe College (AA Degree, Art, 1916), and Harvard University (Master's Degree, Education, 1921). She died in 1927.

== Affiliations ==
Hicks was a charter member of the Massachusetts Floral Emblem Society. She was president of the society in 1898 and 1900. She advocated for the adoption of a floral emblem for the State of Massachusetts.

Hicks was a member of the Anti-Imperialist League, the Wintergreen Club, the New England Women's Club, the Boston Equal Suffrage Association for Good Government, the Twentieth Century Club, Women's Educational and Industrial Union, the Boston Business League, the Woman's Alliance, the Eastern Kindergarten Association, the Walt Whitman Fellowship, the Copley Society, the Unity Art Club, the Public School Art League, the Harvard Teachers' Association (of Cambridge, Massachusetts), the Massachusetts Forestry Association, the Massachusetts Industrial Art Teachers' Association, the Social Service League (of New York City), the Onondaga County Historical Association and the Social Art Club (both of Syracuse), the Eastern Art Teachers' Association, the Western Drawing Teachers' Association, the National Educational Association, the American Association for Physical Training, the Massachusetts Prison Association, the Massachusetts Society for Aiding Discharged Convicts, the American Park and Outdoor Association, and the Appalachian Mountain Club. She was also a proprietor of the Boston Athenaeum and a subscriber to the Boston Museum of Fine Arts.

== Selected works ==
- n.d., The principles of the kindergarten; the foundation for art education in the public schools
- 1887, The Use of models : a teacher's assistant in the use of the Prang models for form study and drawing in primary schools (with John Spencer Clark)
- 1889, Without clay modeling : primary manual : a teacher's assistant in the use of the Prang models for form study and drawing in primary schools. Part 1, First primary year (with J. S. Clark)
- 1892, The Prang primary course in art education; suggestions for the use of form study, drawing, and color in their relation to art education and also in their relation to general education in primary schools (with Josephine C Locke)
- 1893, The Prang primary course in art education
- 1899, Art instruction in primary schools. a manual for teachers (with Edith Clark Chadwick)
