= Babaküçə =

Human settlement in Azerbaijan

Coordinates: 38.9667°N 48.6667°E

Babaküçə is a village and municipality in the Lerik Rayon of Azerbaijan. It has a population of 378. The municipality consists of the villages of Babaküçə and Axunahiran.
