= Wari =

Wari may refer to:

== Civilizations ==
- Wariʼ, Amazonian Amerindian nation
  - Wariʼ language, spoken by the Wariʼ
- Wari Empire, political formation that emerged around AD 500 in Peru
  - Wari culture, Middle Horizon civilization that flourished in Peru
  - Wari (archaeological site), ruins of the capital city of the Wari Empire, located near Quinua, Peru

== Places ==
- Wari, Upper Dir or Union Council, Upper Dir District, Pakistan
- Wari Tehsil, an administrative division in Upper Dir District, Pakistan
- Wari Thana, an administrative unit in Dhaka District, Bangladesh

== Radio stations ==
- WARI (Alabama), a defunct AM radio station, Abbeville, Alabama
- WARI-LP, a defunct radio station in New York, United States

== Other uses ==
- Wari (dance), a typical dance of the Ancash Region in Peru
- Wari (game), or Oware, a board game
- Wari River, or Weri'i, a river in Ethiopia
- Pandharpur Wari, or just Wari, a Hindu pilgrimage tradition

== See also ==
- Waris (disambiguation)
- Warri, a city in Nigeria
- Warir, an island in Indonesia
