= Vares (surname) =

Vares is a surname. In the Estonian language and some dialects of Finnish the word literally means "raven". Notable people with the surname include:

- Johannes Vares (1890–1946), Estonian politician
- Maria Eulália Vares, Brazilian mathematical statistician and probability theorist
- Sergo Vares (born 1982), Estonian actor
- Tõnis Vares (1859–1925), Estonian politician

== Fictional characters ==
- Jussi Vares, fictional Finnish private detective from the novel series Vares by Reijo Mäki and films base on the novels

== See also ==
- Suzanne Vares-Lum
- Abdel Vares Sharraf
- Varis, Finnish surname of the same meaning
