= Jan Veri =

Jan Veri جانوري
- Village
- Location within Iran
- Coordinates: 25°59′08″N 58°58′00″E
- Country: Iran
- Province: Hormozgan
- County: Jask
- Bakhsh: Lirdaf
- Rural District: Surak

Population (2006)
  - Total: 172
- Time zone: UTC+3:30 (IRST)
  - Summer (DST): UTC+4:30 (IRDT)

Jan Veri (Persian: جانوري, also Romanized as Jān Verī) is a village in Surak Rural District, Lirdaf District, Jask County, Hormozgan Province, Iran. At the 2006 census, its population was 172, in 44 families.
