= Ross Verry =

New Zealand cricketer

Personal information
- Full name: Ross Alexander Verry
- Born: 25 October 1964 (age 62); Wellington, New Zealand
- Batting: Right-handed
- Bowling: Right-arm off-break
- Role: Batsman

Domestic team information
- Years: Team
- 1986–1993: Wellington

Career statistics
| Competition | First-class | List A |
|---|---|---|
| Matches | 15 | 3 |
| Runs scored | 590 | 11 |
| Batting average | 26.81 | 5.50 |
| 100s/50s | 1/3 | 0/0 |
| Top score | 132 | 10 |
| Balls bowled | 30 | – |
| Wickets | – | – |
| Bowling average | – | – |
| 5 wickets in innings | – | – |
| 10 wickets in match | – | – |
| Best bowling | – | – |
| Catches/stumpings | 10/– | 0/– |
- Source: CricketArchive, 7 January 2009

Ross Alexander Verry (born 25 October 1964, in Wellington) is a former New Zealand cricketer who played first-class cricket for Wellington. He was a right-hand batsman and right-arm off-spin bowler.

Verry made his first-class debut against Central Districts in the final game of the 1985/86 season, opening the batting he scored 16 in both innings. The following season Verry played a single one-day match, before a five-year break in his cricket career.

Verry returned to make three appearances in 1991, scoring 156 runs in six innings, including two fifties. Verry was used more regularly in the next season playing six matches for a Wellington team which finished bottom of the league. In eleven innings Verry scored 341 runs including the only century of his first-class career. In the final fixture of the season against Northern Districts he scored 132 off 371 balls. He shared a third wicket partnership of 346 with Graham Burnett, this is a record partnership for Wellington for any wicket.

In the 1992/93 season Verry's form dropped, in five matches he averaged 15.25 with a highest score of 28 not out. This proved to be his final season with the club, his final match was a one-day fixture against Northern Districts on 13 January 1993.

Of Māori descent, Verry affiliates to Te Āti Awa of the Taranaki region.
