= Kot Waris =

Kollar
- Village
- Location within Pakistan
- Coordinates: 32.18°N 74.9°E
- Country: Pakistan
- Province: Punjab

Population
  - Total: 4,000
- Time zone: UTC+5 (PST)

Kot Waris is a small village in Wazirabad Tehsil of Gujranwala District, in Punjab, Pakistan. It is located about 8 kilometers from Gakhar Mandi. The village has a primary school for girls and another one for boys.
