= McVerry =

McVerry is a surname. Notable people with the surname include:

- Michael McVerry (1949–1973), Provisional IRA member
- Peter McVerry (born 1944), Irish Roman Catholic priest and activist
- Terrence F. McVerry (born 1943), American federal judge
- Tom McVerry (born 1980), Australian rugby union player
