= Vary (surname) =

Vary is a surname. Notable people with the name include:

- Alec Vary (1908–1977), Australian rules footballer
- Namesake of the William L. Vary House in Livingston County, New York
- Richard Vary Campbell (1840–1901), Scottish advocate, sheriff, and legal author
- Ralph Vary Chamberlin (1879–1967), American biologist

== See also ==
- Very (disambiguation)
