= Lydia Louisa Anna Very =

American poet

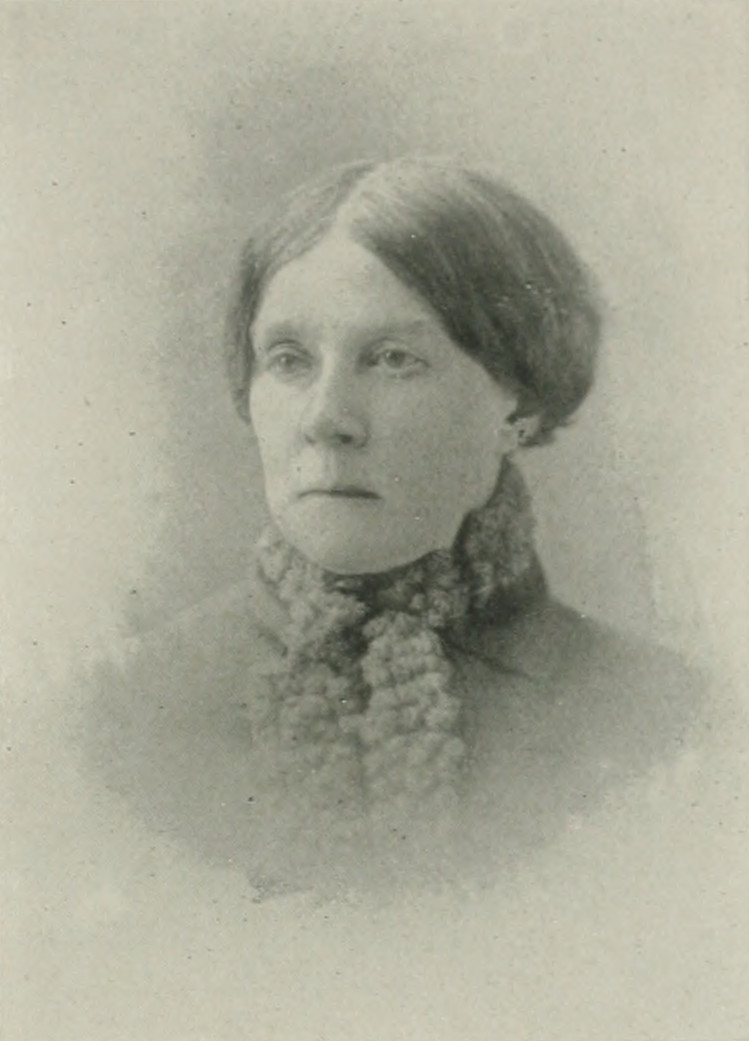
Lydia L. A. Very.

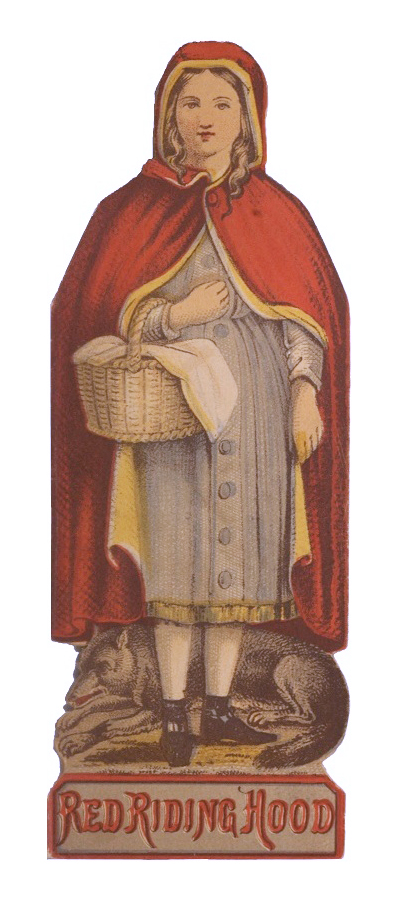
Shaped cover of Lydia L.A. Very's verse tale Red Riding Hood, 1863.

Lydia Louisa Anna Very (November 2, 1823 – September 10, 1901) was an American writer, educator, and illustrator known for authoring the earliest shape books in America.

== Biography ==
She was born in Salem, Massachusetts, the daughter of two first cousins, Lydia Very and Jones Very, a captain during the War of 1812. Her brother Jones became a Transcendentalist poet and clergyman.

She became a teacher at the age of 18 and spent most of her 34-year teaching career in the local public schools. As an artist, she worked in oil and clay.

In 1863 she wrote and designed Red Riding Hood, a verse version of the folk tale "Little Red Riding Hood" that was die-cut into the outline shape of the little girl with the wolf crouching by her feet. Published by L. Prang & Co., it was the first book in the United States to be shaped like a person or an animal. Prang followed up with more shaped books (also known as 'Doll books') written by Very, including Goody Two Shoes and a verse version of Daniel Defoe's Robinson Crusoe. Very claimed the shaped-book design was hers and tried but failed to get a patent; her claim was disputed by Prang, which countered that it had originated the shaped books. In any case, the shaped books were quickly imitated by other publishers, and Very later wrote that she was paid very little for these books, which were quite successful.

Very wrote a great deal of poetry, which she published in magazines and newspapers of the day as well as in two anthologies. She also translated poems from French and German. Her few novels include A Strange Recluse (1899).

The Very family papers, including five volumes of Very's poetry and other materials, were published by the American Antiquarian Society in 2009.

== Books ==
- Poems (1856)
- Red Riding Hood (1863)
- Robinson Crusoe (1864)
- Goody Two Shoes (1865)
- Poems and Prose Writings (1890)
- Sayings and Doings Among Insects and Flowers (1897)
- Sylph, Or the Organ-Grinder's Daughter (1898; with illustrations by Very)
- A Strange Disclosure: A Tale of New England Life (1898)
- A Strange Recluse (1899)
- An Old-Fashioned Garden, and Walks and Musings Therein (1900)
