= Gyula Vári =

Hungarian politician (born 1967)

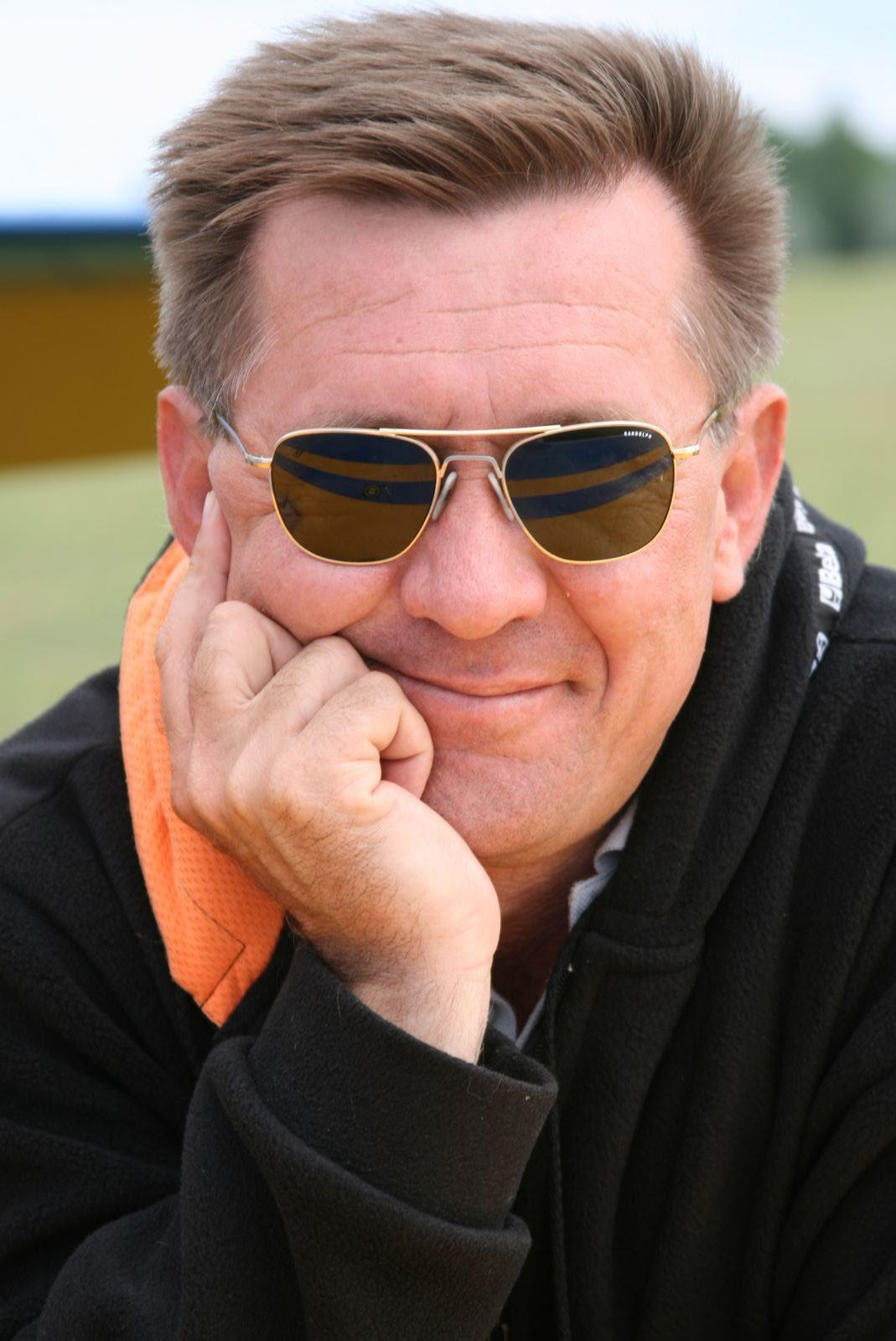
- Born: 6 May 1967; Nagykőrös
- Children: 2
- Aviation career

Racing career
- Best position: 1st (Royal International Air Tattoo 1998, 1999, 2001)
- Aircraft: MiG-29 Yak-52
- Website: http://varigyula.hu]

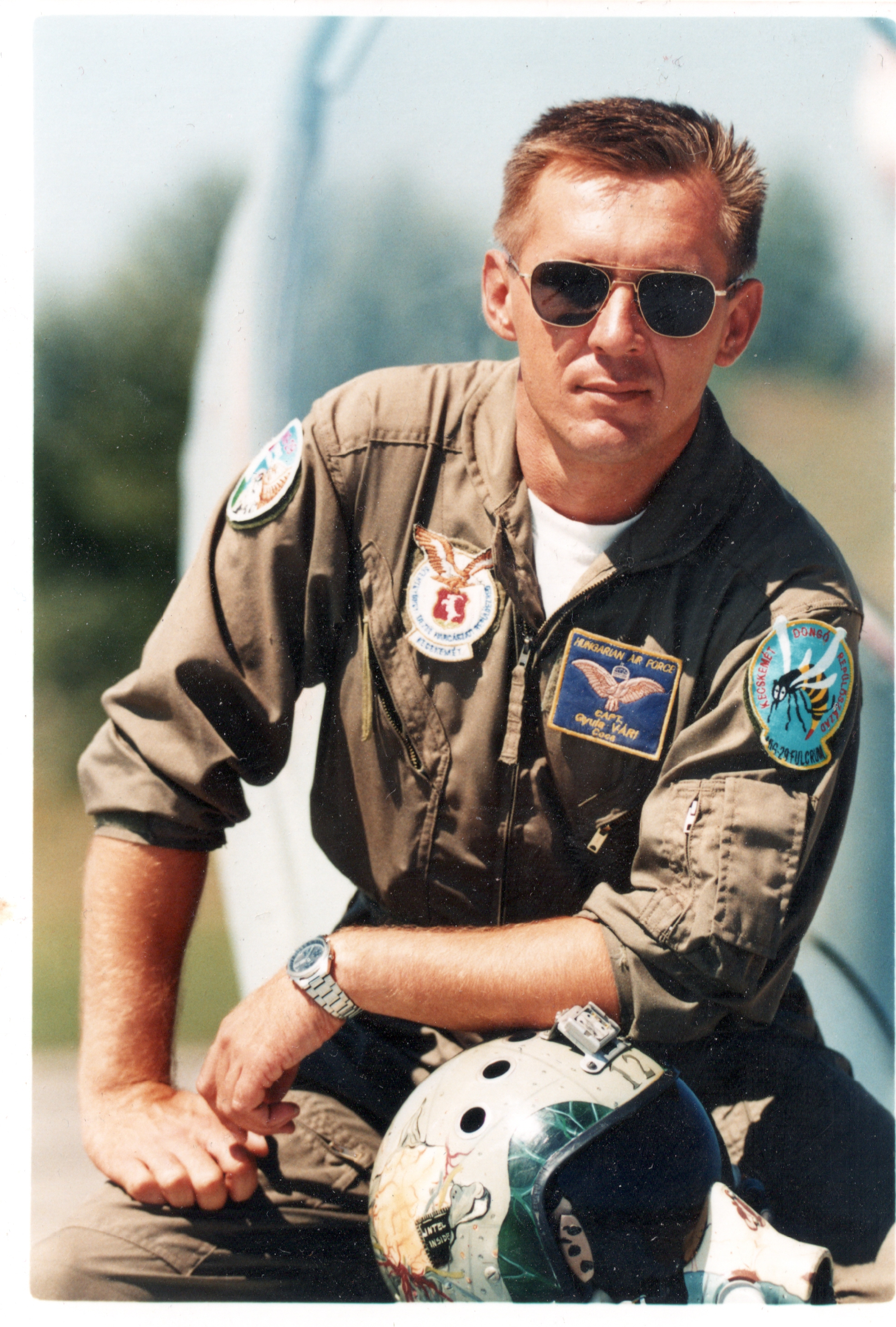
Vári and his plane

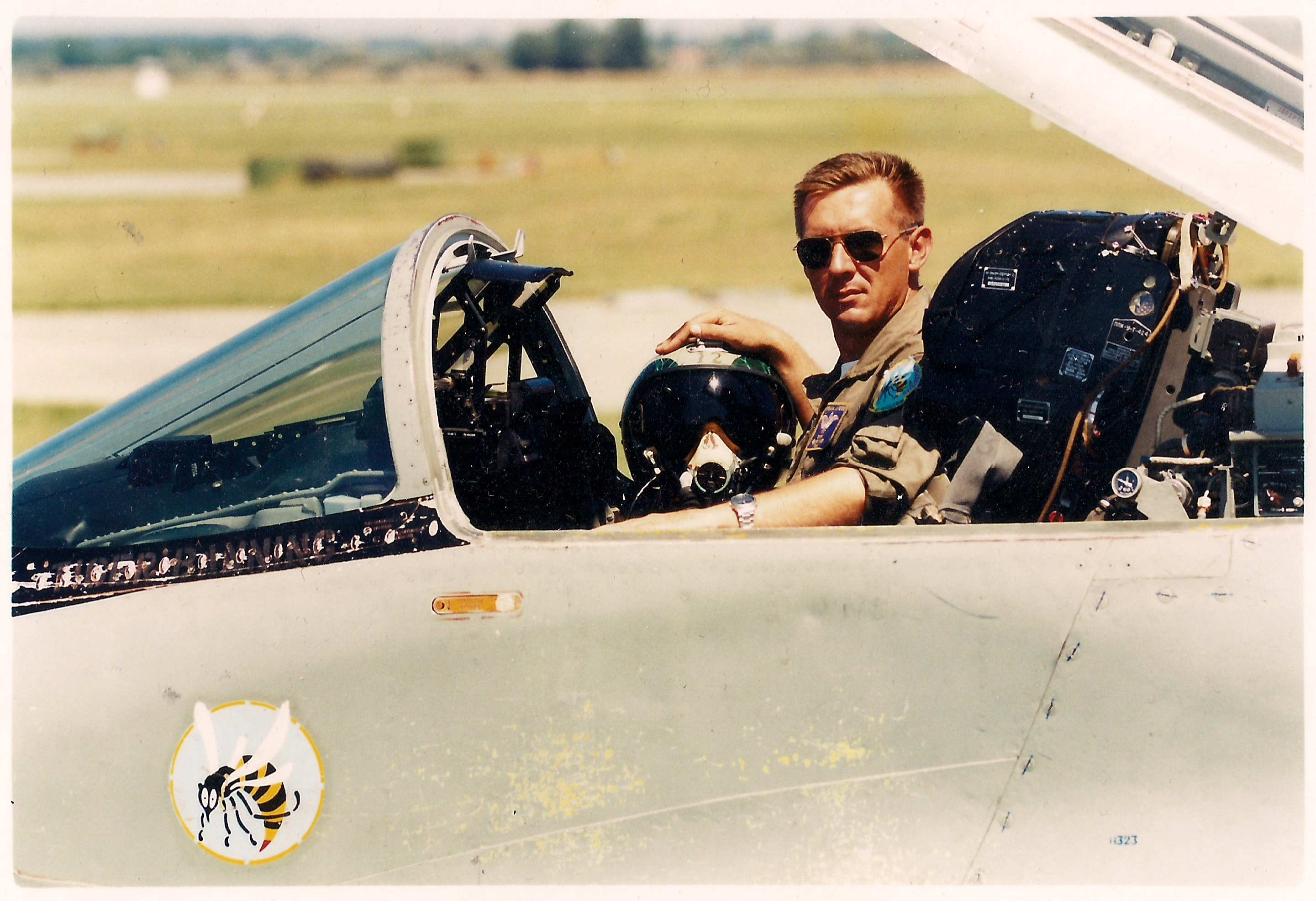
In the cockpit

Gyula Vári (born Nagykőrös, 6 May 1967) is a Hungarian flying officer and politician. He is a former parliamentary representative and observer in the European Parliament.

== Education ==
Gyula decided to take aviation as his profession in secondary school. He performed his first flights in 1983 in Kiskunfélegyháza on a Zlin 142 aircraft and an R-26 Góbé glider. In 1985, he graduated at Kilián György Air Force Academy in Szolnok and later at the Košice VVLS SNP Aviation Engineering College as an aircraft engineer and fighter pilot in the 5-year program.

== Military career ==
After graduating at the Košice College, he spent a year in Szolnok where he participated in weapons training. In 1991 he moved to Kecskemét Air Base to the first flying squadron. He flew MiG-21s (F, MF and UM specs), and in 1993 after training in Russia, he flew MiG-29s (U's and UB's). In 1994 he took part in the TLP (Tactical Leadership Program) in Belgium. In 1995 he studied at the Squadron Officer School at Maxwell Air Force Base in the United States. In 1996 he became a demo pilot for the Hungarian Air Force. From 1997 on he regularly performed at military demonstrations and he obtained his Private and Commercial Pilot Licences.

From 1998 he took part in international competitions. In 1998, 1999 and 2001 he won the As the Crow Flies Trophy at the Royal International Air Tattoo. In 1999 he took home the Solo Jet Aerobatic Trophy. In 2001 he won the Lockheed Martin Cannestra Trophy. In 2000, he became Chief Combat Officer at Kecskemét Air Base.

== Public career ==
He quit the Hungarian Defence Force in 2002 when the Hungarian Socialist Party appointed him as their representative. Although he did not obtain an individual mandate in that year's parliamentary elections, he had a spot on the Party's national list, so he became a representative in the Hungarian Parliament. He became a member of the National Security Committee, vice president of the Hungarian Defence Committee and Chairman of the Technical and Procurement Subcommittee.

He joined the Party in 2003. Soon he was elected vice president of the Party's Bács-Kiskun County organization. He is a deputy member of the Hungarian delegation to the Western European Union's parliamentary assembly, and head of the Hungarian delegation to NATO's parliamentary assembly. Between 2003 and 2004 he was an observer in the European Parliament. In 2004 he became parliamentary representative in the European Union. In 2007 he was elected the county president of the Party.

He was president of the Hungarian Aeronautical Association between 2002 and 2006, from 2004 he served as a board member of the Ferihegy Aircraft Memorial Park (recently Aeropark). From 2007 to 2010 he was president of Lakitelek Aeroclub Sports Association, then from 2008 to 2012 he was the operator of Matkópuszta airfield. In 2009 he became a member of the Hungarian Aerobatic Team. In 2012 he obtained UL A1 (single seat ultralight) and UL A2 (double seat ultralight) licences and became a UL A2 instructor. In 2012 he joined the "Legends in the Air" airshow team. In 2017 he became president of the Orion Sports Flying Association. He joined the Hungarian Ultralight Flying Association when it was founded. He is a member of the Ballószög, Veszprém and Kiskőrös Flying Associations. He has instructor's, demo and test pilot licences on fixed wing aircraft. He speaks English, Czech and Slovak.

== Awards and honors ==
- 1998 Royal International Air Tattoo As the Crow Flies Trophy
- 1999 RIAT As the Crow Flies Trophy, Solo Jet Aerobatic Trophy
- 2001 RIAT As the Crow Flies Trophy, Lockheed-Martin Cannestra Trophy
- since 2006 he's Knight of Malta
- 2007 "European Air Venture” Yak-52 category winner
- 2009 Hungarian National Powered Aerobatic Championship Yak-52 category first
- 2010 Hungarian National Powered Aerobatic Championship Yak-52 category first
- 2010 Hungarian National Powered Aerobatic Championship Freestyle category first
- 2012 Massa Airshow awarded (Aeroclub di Marina di Massa, Italy)
- 2014 Forte dei Marmi Airshow awarded (Aeroclub Bresso, Italy)
- 2015 Parma Airshow awarded (Aeroclub Parma, Italy)
- 2017 5th Danubia Powered Aerobatic Cup intermediate 1st Free Unknown 2nd
- 2017 5th Danubia Powered Aerobatic Cup intermediate 3rd Free Unknown 2nd
- 2017 5th Danubia Powered Aerobatic Cup Freestyle 3rd

== Family ==
Gyula is married, and is a father of two daughters.

== Sources ==
- 5th Danubia Cup results
