= Verree =

Verree is both a given name and a surname. Notable people with the name include:

- Verree Teasdale (1903-1987), American actress
- John Paul Verree (1817-1889), American politician and businessman

== See also ==
- Verree Road, a major road in Philadelphia, Pennsylvania, United States - see Bustleton, Philadelphia
