= Verey =

Verey is an English surname. The Internet surname database suggests; "it is a variant of Very, which is of English origin and is a locational name of an unidentified place in northern France, named with the Gaulish element "ver(n), alder, of the Gallo-Roman personal name "verus", true, and the local suffix - acum."

Development of the name since 1569 includes the following: William Very (1600, London), Robert (1613, Oxford) and Samuel Verry (1795, London). The modern surname can be found as Very, Verry, Verrey and Verey.

Notable persons with the surname include:

- Adolphus Verey, (1862–1933) Australian photographer
- David Verey (born 1950), English banker and philanthropist
- Henry Verey (1836–1920), British barrister, Official Referee of the Supreme Court of Judicature
- Michael Verey (1912–2000), British merchant banker and former chairman of Schroders
- Roger Verey (1912–2000), Polish Olympic rower
- Rosemary Verey (1918–2001), British garden designer, lecturer and writer
