= Vary, Perm Krai =

Vary Вары
- Village
- Location within Perm Krai Location within Russia
- Coordinates: 57°30′N 54°33′E
- Country: Russia
- Region: Perm Krai
- District: Bolshesosnovsky District
- Time zone: UTC+5:00

Vary (Russian: Вары) is a rural locality (a village) in Chernovskoye Rural Settlement, Bolshesosnovsky District, Perm Krai, Russia. The population was 120 as of 2010. There is one street.

== Geography ==
Vary is located 21 km south of Bolshaya Sosnova (the district's administrative centre) by road. Chernovskoye is the nearest rural locality.
