= Varis =

Varis is both a surname and a given name. In Finnish the word literally means "hooded crow". Notable people with the name include:

== Surname ==
- Agnes Varis (1930–2011), American businesswoman
- Kaisa Varis (born 1975), Finnish cross-country skier and biathlete
- Pekka Varis, Finnish ski-orienteer
- Petri Varis (born 1969), Finnish ice hockey player

=== Given name ===
- Varis Brasla (born 1939), Latvian film director

== See also ==
- Vari (disambiguation)
- Varys, a fictional character from the A Song of Ice and Fire series and Game of Thrones
