= Veri, Azerbaijan =

Veri
- Municipality
- Location within Azerbaijan
- Coordinates: 38°41′15″N 48°32′00″E
- Country: Azerbaijan
- Rayon: Lerik

Population
  - Total: 786
- Time zone: UTC+4 (AZT)
  - Summer (DST): UTC+5 (AZT)

Veri is a village and municipality in the Lerik Rayon of Azerbaijan. It has a population of 786.
