= Normal school =

Educational institution to train teachers

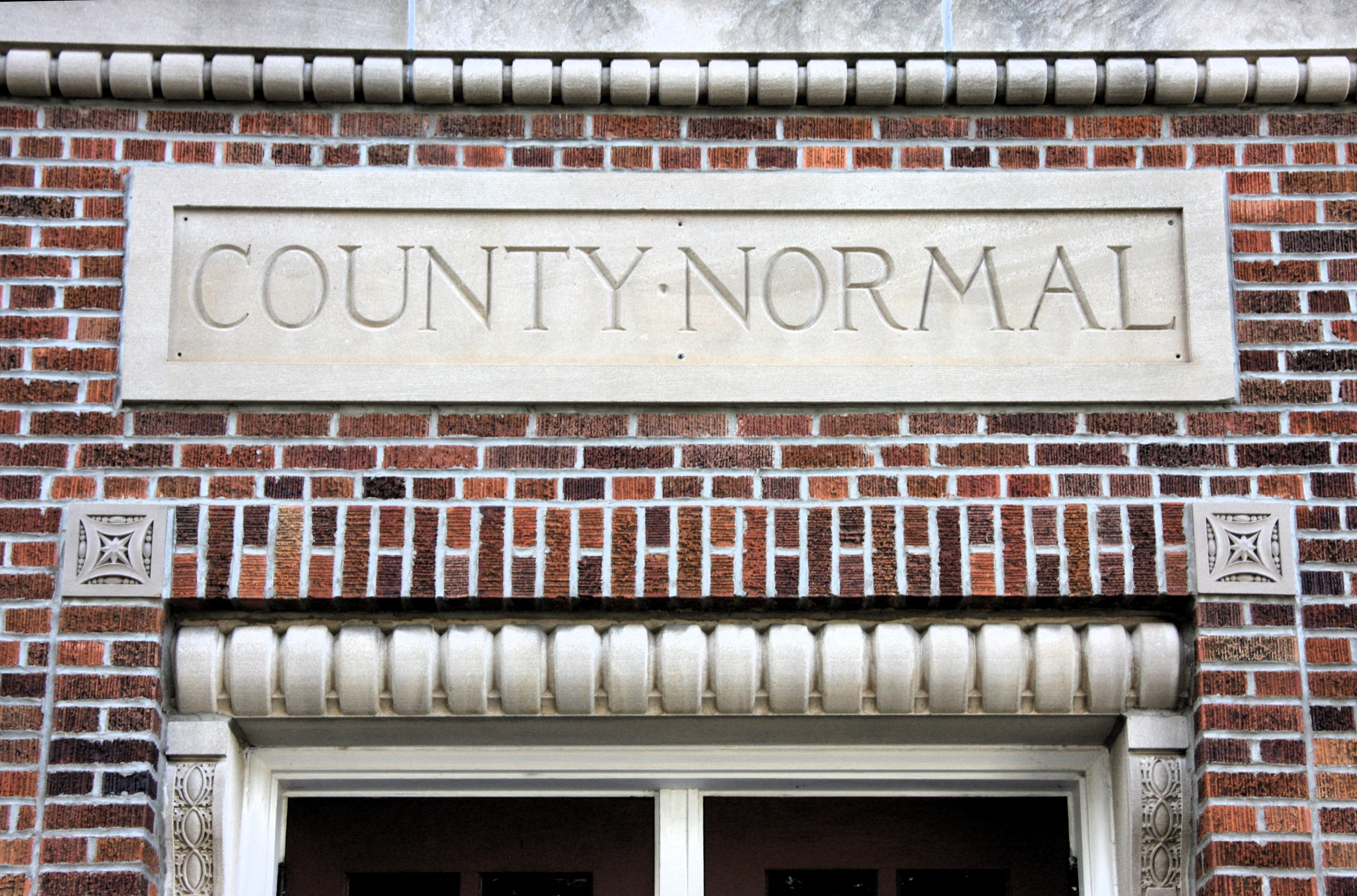
"County Normal" above an entrance to the normal school in Viroqua, Wisconsin

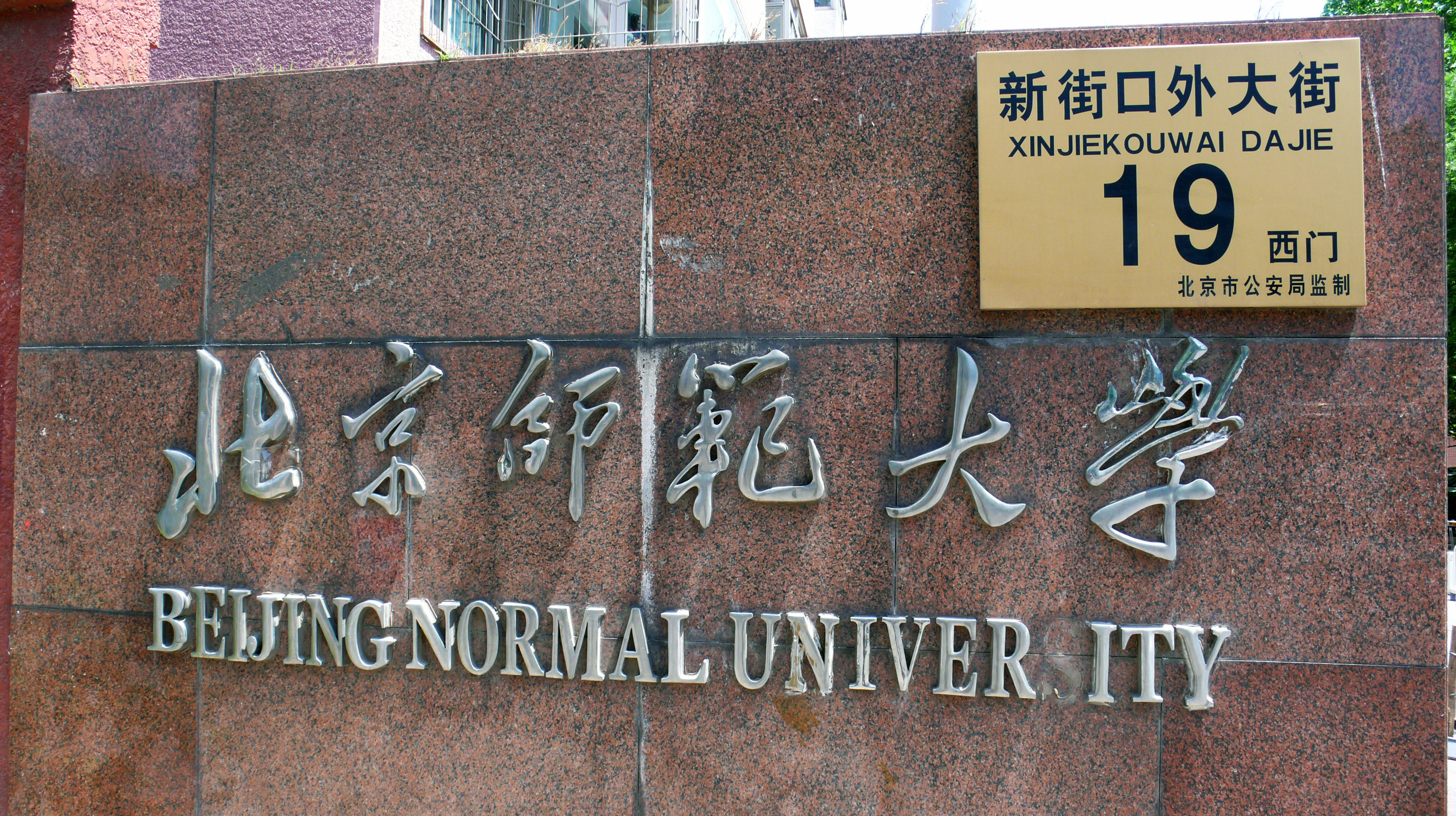
An entrance gate at Beijing Normal University, an example of a comprehensive research university established as a normal school

A normal school, or normal college, trains teachers in the norms of pedagogy and curriculum. Other names include teacher training colleges or teachers' colleges. In Argentina and Mexico, they continue to be called normal schools with student-teachers in the latter country being known as normalistas, where schools require a high school diploma for entry, and may be part of a comprehensive university. Normal schools in the United States, Canada, and Argentina trained primary teachers, while in Europe equivalent colleges trained teachers for primary and secondary schools.

In 1685, Jean-Baptiste de La Salle established the Institute of the Brothers of the Christian Schools, and founded what is generally considered the first normal school, the École normale, in Reims, Champagne, France. The term "normal" in this context refers to the goal of these institutions to instil and reinforce particular norms within students. "Norms" included historical behavioral norms of the time, as well as norms that reinforced targeted societal values, ideologies and dominant narratives in the form of curriculum.

The first public normal school in the United States was founded in Concord, Vermont, by Samuel Read Hall in 1823 to train teachers. In 1839, the first state-supported normal school utilized the former Lexington Academy building, having been established by the Commonwealth of Massachusetts; it evolved into Framingham State University. The first modern teacher training school in China was established by educator Sheng Xuanhuai in 1895 as the normal school of the Nanyang Public School (now Shanghai Jiao Tong University) in Shanghai during the Qing dynasty.

Several comprehensive public or state-supported universities—such as UCLA in the United States and Beijing Normal University in China—began as normal schools and later expanded their faculties and programs to become research universities.

== Etymology ==
The term normal school originated in the early 17th century from the French école normale. The French concept of an école normale was to provide a model school with model classrooms to teach model teaching practices to its student teachers, and thereby to set the norm for the profession of teaching.

== Europe ==
Educating teachers was of great importance in the newly industrialized European economies which needed a reliable, reproducible and uniform work force. The process of instilling such norms within students depended upon the creation of the first uniform, formalized national educational curriculum. Thus, normal schools, as the teacher training schools, were tasked with both developing this new curriculum and developing the techniques through which teachers would instill these ideas, behaviors and values in the minds of their students.

=== Germany ===
In Germany, schools of education only exist in the state of Baden-Württemberg. These schools prepare teachers for Grundschule (primary school) and secondary schools like Hauptschule and Realschule. Teachers for the Gymnasium are educated at universities. In the past there were Teachers' seminars, Studienseminar, and normal schools (de:Normalschule:Normalschule).

=== Finland ===
In Finland, normal schools are under national university administration, whereas most schools are administered by the local municipality. Aspirant teachers do most of their compulsory trainee period in normal schools and teach while being supervised by a senior teacher.

=== France ===
In France, a two-tier system developed after the Revolution: primary school teachers were educated at départemental écoles normales and high school teachers and university professors at the écoles normales supérieures. Nowadays all teachers are educated in an Institut national supérieur du professorat et de l'éducation (Graduate School of Teaching and Education).

=== Italy ===
In Italy, normal schools are now termed Liceo delle Scienze Umane. The Scuola Normale Superiore di Pisa now focuses mainly on training researchers.

=== Lithuania ===
In Lithuania, Lithuanian University of Educational Sciences (LEU), former Vilnius Pedagogical University (VPU) is the main teachers' training institution, established in 1935.

=== Serbia ===
In Serbia, the first public normal school was founded in Sombor, Vojvodina, by Avram Mrazović in 1778 to train teachers. In 2018, the Faculty of Education in Sombor celebrated 240 years since the founding of the first school for the education of Serbian teachers called Norma. It was a teacher training college at the beginning called Norma college before it was closed in 1811, and another school was opened in its place in 1812 in Szentendre under the Declaratory Rescript of the Illyrian Nation. The new institution was named Regium Pedagogium Nationis Illiricae or Royal Pedagogium Of The Illyrian-Serbian Nation (also referred to in Latin as Preparandium or Preparadija in Serbian) which eventually was relocated back to Sombor in 1816. The Normal school – Teachers College is generally considered the first normal school or École normale in Sombor. The term "normal" in this case refers to "the goal of the institution to instill and reinforce particular norms within students". Also, these "norms included historical behavioral norms of the time, as well as norms that reinforced targeted societal values, ideologies and dominant narratives in the form of curriculum". For the longest time, this was the only academy for teachers' training in Serbian. The first woman academician of the Serbian Academy of Sciences and Arts Isidora Sekulić, the poet Jovan Dučić, the composers Petar Konjović and Josif Marinković are just some of the alumni of Norma.

=== Spain ===
In Spain, the first public normal school was the Escuela Normal de Madrid, founded in Madrid in 1839. It was gradually integrated into the Complutense University of Madrid's Faculty of Education between 1991 and 1995. Later normal schools were founded in Zamora (1841), Segovia (1857), Salamanca and Valladolid.

=== United Kingdom ===
In the United Kingdom, teacher training colleges were once named as such, and were independent institutions.

Following the recommendation of the 1963 Robbins Report into higher education, teacher training colleges were renamed "Colleges of Education". Later in the 20th century some became a "College of Higher Education" or an "Institute of Higher Education". For information about academic divisions devoted to this field outside of the United States and Canada, see Postgraduate Training in Education (disambiguation).

The long-term restructuring of higher education in the UK, beginning in the 1990s, has resulted in establishments either taking the status of "university" or merging. The University of Chester, founded by the Church of England, traces its roots back to 1839 as the earliest teacher training college in the United Kingdom. Others were also established by religious institutions, and most were single-sex until World War II. Since then, they have either become multi-discipline universities in their own right (e.g. Bishop Grosseteste University; University of Chester; Edge Hill University; St Mary's University, Twickenham; Newman University, Birmingham; Plymouth Marjon University; University of Winchester; University of Worcester; York St John University) or merged with another university to become its faculty of education (e.g. Moray House).

In Wales there were at least three institutions which included the word "Normal" in their name: Normal School, Brecon, subsequently relocated to become Normal College Swansea (where the academic and mathematician John Viriamu Jones was educated); and Normal College, Bangor (founded 1858), which survived until 1996, when it became part of University of Wales Bangor. The latter was one of the last institutions in the UK to retain the word "Normal" in its name.

== Asia ==
=== China ===
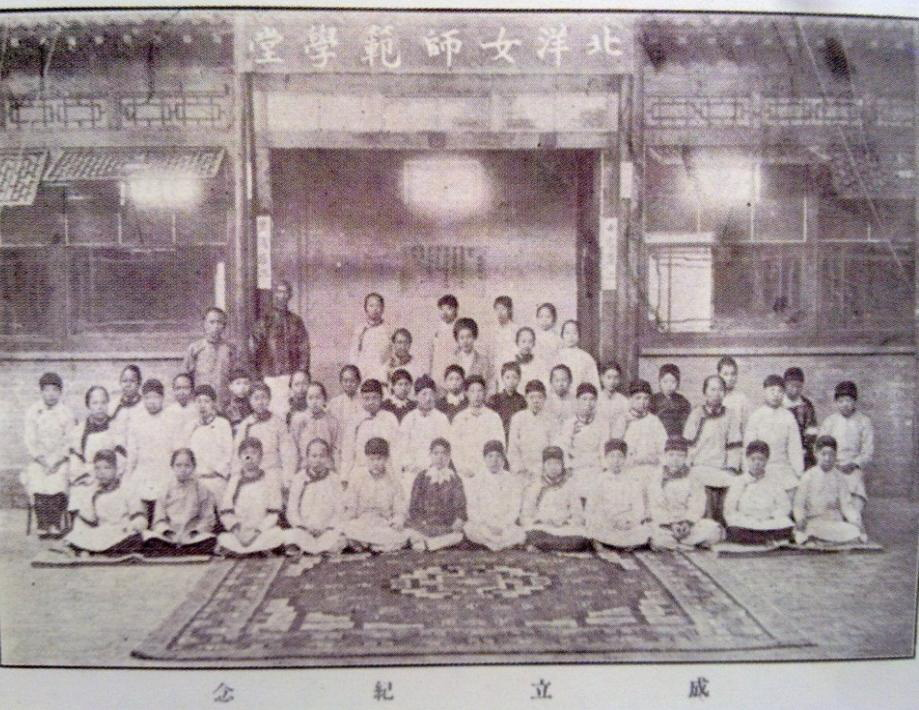
Students of the Beiyang Women's Normal School, an early example of a normal school in China (1912)

In Mainland China, the "normal school" terminology is still preserved in the official English names of former normal schools established in the late 19th and early 20th century. The Chinese term normal university (Chinese: 师范大学; pinyin: shīfàn dàxué, abbreviated 师大; shīdà) refers to a modern comprehensive university established as a normal school in the early twentieth century. These "normal universities" are usually controlled by the national or provincial government.

In 1895, Qing banking tycoon and educator Sheng Xuanhuai gained approval from the Guangxu Emperor to establish the Nanyang Public School in Shanghai, China.

In 1923, the Supreme Education School of Peking (Chinese: 京师优级师范学堂) was renamed as National Beijing Normal University (Chinese: 国立北京师范大学校), the first Normal University in China.

Since 1949, many former normal schools in China developed into comprehensive research universities. As of 2025, Beijing Normal University and East China Normal University, both members of the national government's Project 985 program, were ranked the top two among the mainland Chinese universities that originated as normal schools.

=== India ===
Sarah Tucker, with her brother John Tucker, opened the oldest women's normal school in Tamil Nadu in 1843. While the original site closed after a few years, a new site was opened in 1857 in Palayamkottai. Sarah Tucker College is now a constituent college of Manonmaniam Sundaranar University.

=== Indonesia ===
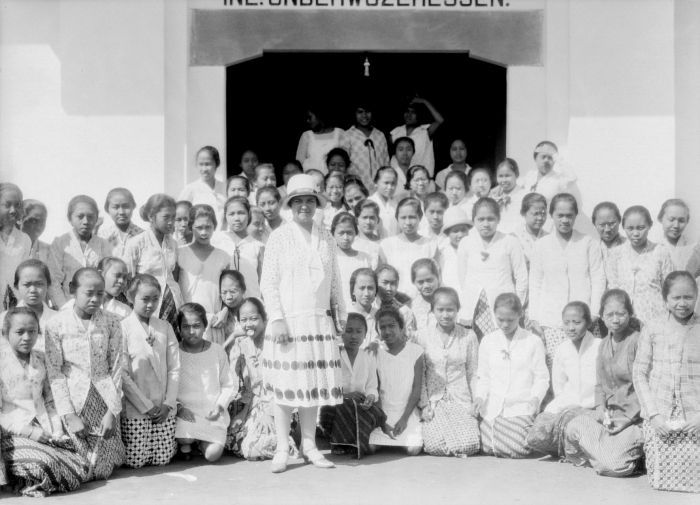
Trainee teachers at the college in Salatiga, Java, Indonesia (October 5, 1929)

In Indonesia there were specialised higher institutions to educate teachers in the norms of pedagogy and curriculum. The Indonesian government created a crash program around 1950 as B-I/B-II/PGSLP course. In 1954, the government opened the Teacher Education Higher Education Institutions (Perguruan Tinggi Pendidikan Guru, PTPG) in Batusangkar, Manado, Bandung, and Malang by Education and Culture Ministerial Decision No. 382/Kab Year 1954. Both courses were integrated to Teaching and Pedagogy Faculty at nearby university. Government Decision No. 51 Year 1958 integrate Pedagogy Faculty into Teaching and Pedagogy Faculty. In year 1962, Ministry of Basic Education established Teacher Education Institute (Institut Pendidikan Guru, IPG) for middle school teacher. In year 1963, B-I and B-II courses and IPG were merged into Teaching and Pedagogy Faculty under Ministry of Higher Education. In year 1963–1964, Teaching and Pedagogy Faculties were established as separate higher education institutions which were known as Teaching and Education Institutes (Institut Keguruan dan Ilmu Pendidikan, IKIP). Presidential Decision No. 93 Year 1999 allowed IKIP to develop non-educational sciences and marked the end of specialised teacher education higher institutions in general.

=== Japan ===
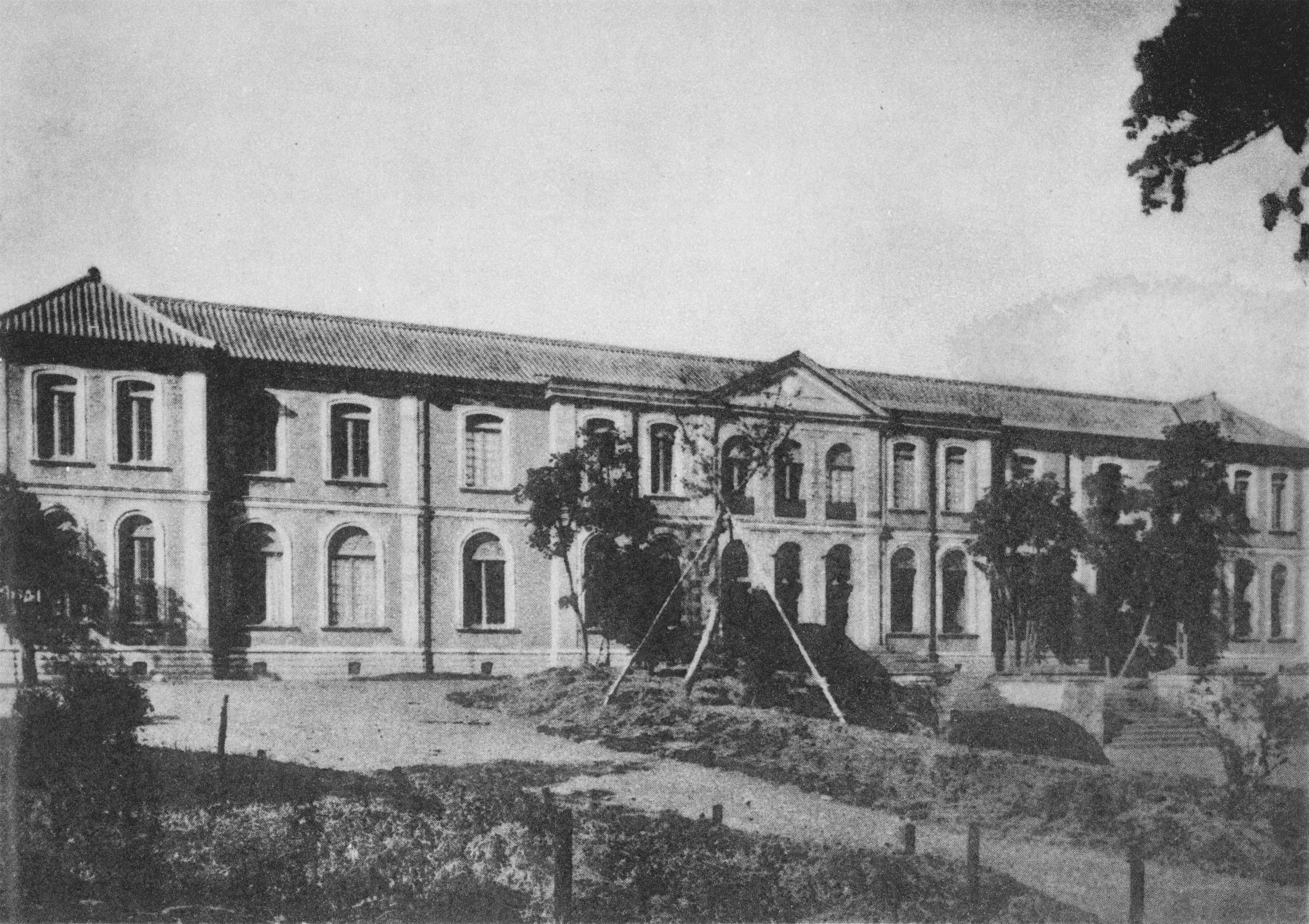
Tokyo Higher Normal School in 1887

In Japan, the first normal school (師範学校) was established at Yushima Seido, Tokyo in 1872.

In 1886, the Normal School Order (師範学校令) was promulgated and the Higher Normal School (高等師範学校) was established in Tokyo to train secondary teachers.

In 1929, Tokyo Arts and Sciences University (Tsukuba University) and Hiroshima Arts and Sciences University (Hiroshima University) were established for Normal School graduates.

=== Malaysia ===
In Malaysia the Ministry of Education runs a total of 27 Institutes of Teacher Education (ITEs), which were formerly known as Teacher Training Colleges. These ITEs function primarily to educated both undergraduate and postgraduate teacher trainees. The ministry bureau responsible for overseeing them is the Teacher Education Division. The ITEs also run in-service teacher training and continuous professional development among qualified teachers.

=== Philippines ===
In Naga City, one can find the oldest normal school for girls in the Far East, the Universidad de Santa Isabel. It is a sectarian school run by the Daughters of Charity. The first secular normal school was founded in 1901 by the Thomasites, the Philippine Normal School. It was converted into a college in 1949 and was elevated to its present university status in 1992 as the Philippine Normal University. In 2009, it was designated as the country's National Center for Teacher Education by virtue of Republic Act 9647. In Iloilo City, the West Visayas State University was originally established as a normal school in 1902; in 1994, it was recognized by the government of the Philippines as a Center for Teaching Excellence.

In March 2026, the Department of Education and the Department of Budget and Management signed a Joint Memorandum Circular for the establishment of Teacher Education Excellence Centers in the Philippines which includes the Philippine Normal University, University of the Philippines Los Baños, University of San Carlos, Mindanao State University–Iligan Institute of Technology, Caraga State University, and Cotabato State University. The program is aligned with Republic Act No. 11713 or the Excellence in Teacher Education Act.

=== Taiwan ===
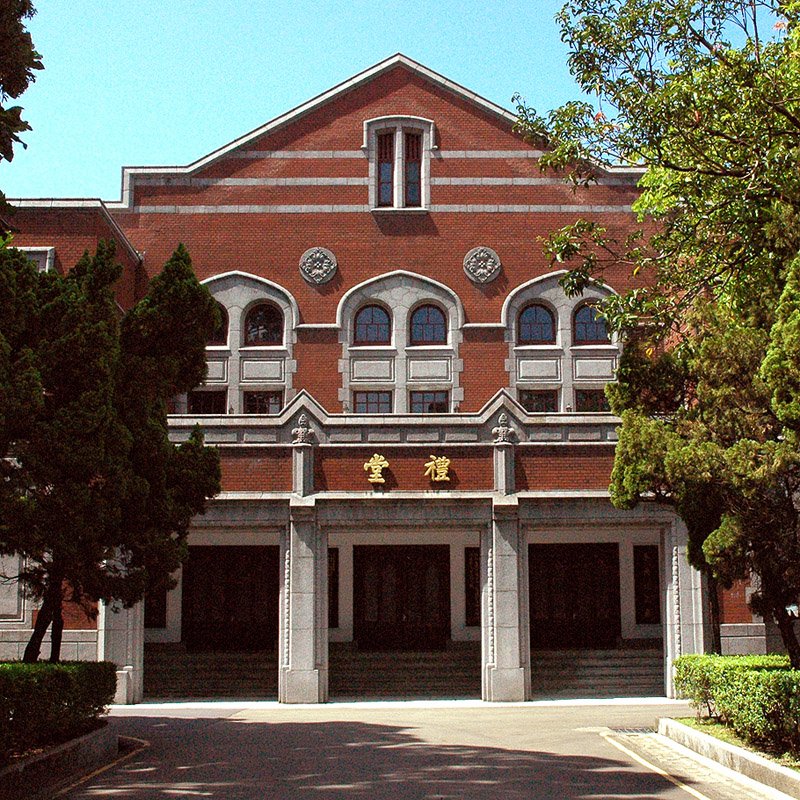
A lecture hall dating from the Japanese colonial era at the National Taiwan Normal University in Taipei

In Taiwan, three universities served as national normal universities historically. Located in Taipei (National Taiwan Normal University), Changhua (National Changhua University of Education), and Kaohsiung (National Kaohsiung Normal University), the schools primarily cultivates secondary school teachers and also trains teachers for preschool, elementary school, special education and other fields. These schools' missions have expanded since to make them de facto comprehensive research or liberal arts universities.

NCUE did not adopt the term "normal university" because its predecessor was named Taiwan Provincial College of Education, and it was unrelated to the subsequent trend of renaming education universities.

Ten Taiwanese normal schools (Chinese: 師範學院; pinyin: shīfàn xuéyuàn, abbreviated 師院; shīyuàn, "normal colleges") were established under Japanese rule and at the end of World War 2, serving for primary school teacher's education. These were promoted as teachers' colleges and later granted university status in 2000s. It is distinguished under the name "Education University" from the "Normal University". Some of these were merged with comprehensive university, such as National Hualien University of Education, which were merged with National Dong Hwa University in 2007. Some of them were merged with professional university, such as Taipei Physical Education College was merged with Taipei Municipal University of Education to form the University of Taipei in 2013.

== Oceania ==
=== New Zealand ===
In New Zealand, the term normal school can refer to a primary or intermediate school used for teacher training, such as the Epsom Normal Primary School (in Auckland), Kelburn Normal School, Palmerston North Intermediate Normal School, Papakura Normal School, Central Normal School in Palmerston North, and Tahuna Normal Intermediate School and George Street Normal School in Dunedin. They were associated with a teachers' training college, such as the Auckland College of Education and the Dunedin College of Education, which became colleges of education that trained secondary as well as primary and intermediate school teachers.

== North and South America ==
=== Canada ===
==== Alberta ====
The Calgary Normal School was founded shortly after Alberta became a province in 1905. In 1945 all normal schools in Alberta were merged into the University of Alberta's Faculty of Education. The former Normal School became part of the new University of Calgary in 1966. Another Normal school was founded at Camrose (also called Rosehaven Normal school) in 1912. Edmonton Normal School was opened in 1920 in Edmonton, Alberta.

==== British Columbia ====
In 1901, the first Provincial Normal School in British Columbia was opened in Vancouver. Classes commenced on 9 January 1901. In January 1909, the Provincial Normal school moved into a new facility and its own building located at 11th and Cambie (now part of City Square Mall). In 1915 a second Provincial Normal School opened in Victoria. Trainee teachers from greater Vancouver and the lower Mainland attended the Normal School in Vancouver. Students from Vancouver Island and students outside the Lower Mainland, that is, from the Upper Fraser Valley and communities in the interior of the province – enrolled in the Normal School in Victoria. That school was originally located in Victoria High School and later in its own building which is now part of Camosun College. In 1956 the responsibility for provincial teacher training was transferred to The University of British Columbia.

==== Manitoba ====
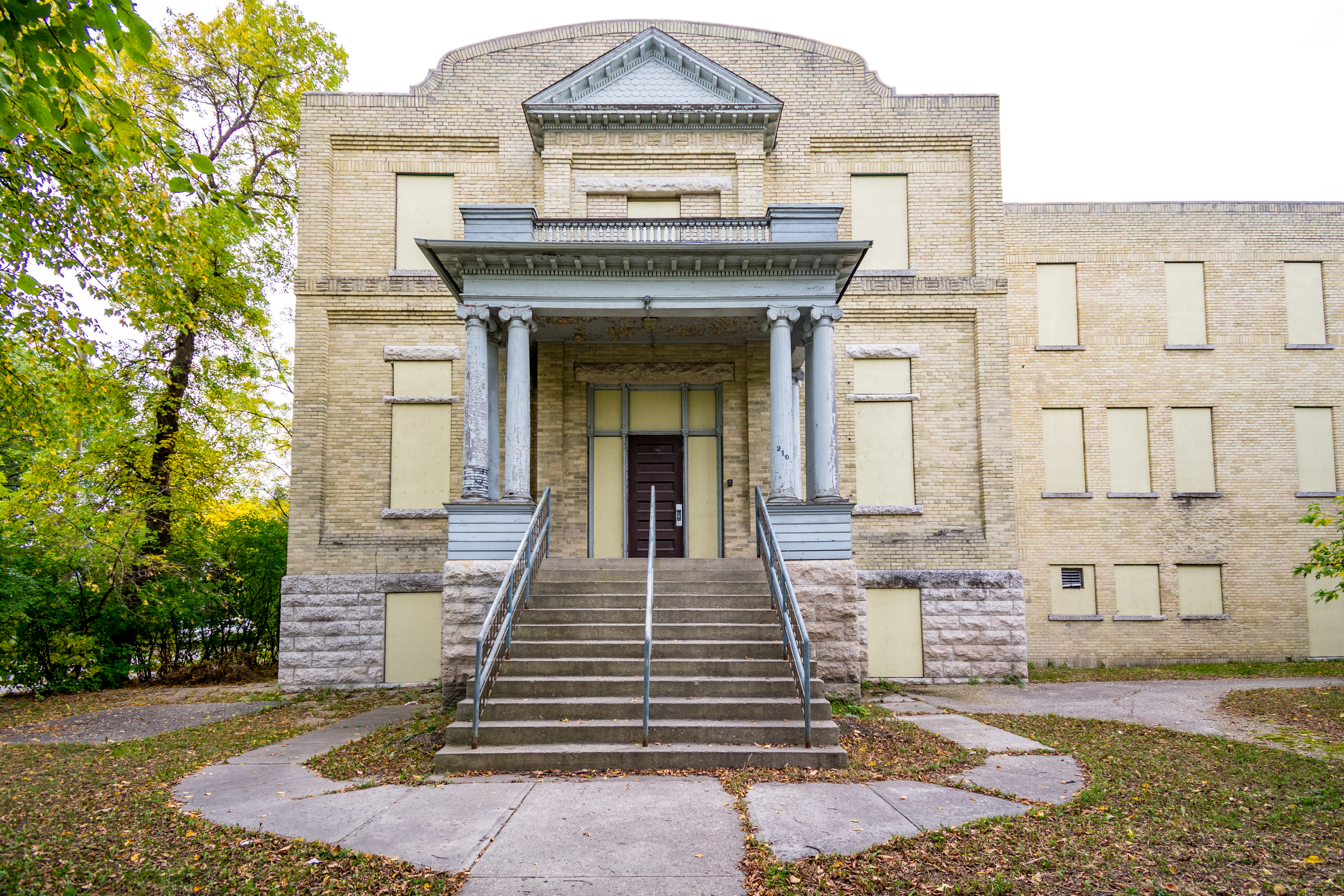
St. Boniface Normal School, designed by Henry Sandham Griffith in 1902

Central Normal School was founded in 1882 in Winnipeg. In 1905–06 a new building was constructed at 442 William Avenue. It was one of six Normal Schools in Manitoba, along with Brandon Normal School (1129 Queens Street, Brandon), Dauphin, Manitou, Portage la Prairie, and St. Boniface. Central Normal School moved to a facility in southwest Winnipeg in 1947. In the autumn of 1958, it was renamed the Manitoba Teachers' College. It was moved to the University of Manitoba in 1965, becoming its Faculty of Education.

==== New Brunswick ====
The New Brunswick Teachers' College was a normal school in Fredericton, New Brunswick which granted teaching certificates. It was founded on February 10, 1848, as the Provincial Normal School with Joseph Marshall de Brett Maréchal, Baron d'Avray as the first principal. In 1947, the institution changed its name to the New Brunswick Teachers' College. It closed in 1973, and its staff were integrated into the faculties of education at the Université de Moncton and the University of New Brunswick.

==== Newfoundland and Labrador ====
The Wesleyan Normal Day School was founded in 1852 by the Wesleyans under the Newfoundland School Society. This institution continued until 1901. In 1910, a normal school was established in St. John's by the Church of England which continued for a number of years. In 1921 the first non-denominational normal school was initiated and was discontinued in 1932. It was reorganized in 1934 as a department of the Memorial University College. In 1949, the institution's name was changed to Memorial University of Newfoundland.

==== Nova Scotia ====
The Nova Scotia Teachers College in Truro began in 1855 as the Provincial Nova Scotia Normal School opened in Truro, Nova Scotia. The school was closed in 1997 and the program essentially consolidated with other provincial universities including Acadia University, Mount St. Vincent, St. Francis Xavier, and Sainte-Anne.

==== Ontario ====
Thanks largely in part to the effort of education reformer Egerton Ryerson, the Ontario Normal School system came into being beginning in Toronto in 1847.

The London Normal School was located at 165 Elmwood Avenue in London, Ontario, and commenced classes on February 1, 1900. By 1958, the building was no longer adequate and was moved to a new location on Western Rd. In 1973, London Teachers' College (as it was then called) (Elborn) merged with Althouse College to form the Faculty of Education at the University of Western Ontario. The building is now a prominent area landmark.

The North Bay Normal School, a teacher training school, was established in 1909 in North Bay Ontario to meet the needs of teacher education in Ontario's North. The school was renamed North Bay Teachers' College in 1953, and became Nipissing University College's faculty of education in August 1973. After the university received a prestigious award in 2010, the Faculty of Education was renamed the Schulich School of Education. See Nipissing University.

A school of pedagogy was formed in association with Toronto Normal School, offering advanced level courses suitable for high-school teachers. In 1897, the school was moved to Hamilton and renamed Ontario Normal College. The college closed in 1906 and the training was taken over by the faculties of education at the University of Toronto and Queen's University in Kingston.

The Ottawa Normal School was built in 1874 and opened in 1875. It was located at 195 Elgin Street. It was renamed the Ottawa Teachers' College in 1953, and was subsequently merged into the Faculty of Education of the University of Ottawa in 1974.

The Peterborough Normal School in Peterborough was officially opened on September 15, 1908, and operated until the late 1960s.

The Stratford Normal School was founded at 270 Water Street in 1908 in Stratford, Ontario. Its emphasis was primarily for training teachers for rural conditions. Its name was changed to Stratford Teachers' College in 1953 and closed its doors in 1973 having trained close to 14,000 teachers. The site was maintained, and was home to the Stratford Perth Museum for a number of years, being renamed the Discovery Centre. The museum moved to another location, however, and the building is now leased by the Stratford Shakespeare Festival, and has been named once again the Normal School Building.

==== Prince Edward Island ====
The Prince Edward Island Normal School has its origin in 1856 on the grounds of Prince of Wales College in Charlottetown, P.E.I. Both it and St. Dunstan's University merged to form the present-day University of Prince Edward Island in 1969.

==== Quebec ====
The first three Écoles normales were established in 1857, two for French speakers in Montréal and Québec, and a third one in Montréal for English speakers. More institutions were added in the following century. Religious communities were responsible for around 110 private normal schools, most of which were for girls, and universities had schools of education. Between 1963 and 1974, the system was ultimately phased out to be integrated into universities' Faculty of Education departments, specifically with new Université du Québec branches.

==== Saskatchewan ====
The Saskatchewan Normal School, also once known as the Regina Normal School, was founded as early as 1890 in Regina moving into its first permanent structure in January, 1914. In 1964 it was transferred to University of Saskatchewan Regina Campus and in 1974 becoming part of the University of Regina. Another normal school was founded in the early 1920s in Moose Jaw and was later transferred into the Regina campus in 1959.

The Saskatoon Normal School in Saskatoon was founded in 1912 and served until 1953. It has now been integrated with the Faculty of Education at University of Saskatchewan.

=== Jamaica ===
Mico University College is the oldest teacher training institute in the English-speaking world outside of Europe. It was founded under Lady Mico Charity in 1834 by Sir Thomas Fowell Buxton "to afford the benefit of education and training to the black and coloured population." Today, it offers undergraduate and graduate degrees in a variety of education and liberal arts disciplines.

=== Latin America ===
==== Argentina ====
In Argentina, normal schools were founded starting in 1852, and still exist today and carry that name. Teachers' training is considered higher education and requires a high school diploma, but normal schools have the particularity of granting five-year teacher degrees for primary school or four year degrees for kindergarten, while at the same time hosting secondary, primary school students, and kindergarten and pre-school. Teachers-to-be do intense practical training in the schools annexed to the higher education section. This is the main difference with other teachers' training institutions called Instituto de Formación Docente and with universities that grant teaching degrees.

==== Brazil ====
The first and oldest operating normal school in Brazil is the Escola Normal de Niterói, founded in Niterói in 1835 and renamed to Instituto de Educação Professor Ismael Coutinho in 1965. It is not the oldest continually operating normal school in Latin America as it was disestablished from 1847 to 1862, and again from 1890 to 1931. Many Brazilian states later founded their own normal schools to train primary school teachers.

==== Chile ====
Perhaps the oldest continually operating normal school in Latin America is the Escuela Normal Superior José Abelardo Núñez, founded in Santiago, Chile, in 1842 as the Escuela de Preceptores de Santiago under the direction of the Argentine educator, writer, and politician Domingo Faustino Sarmiento.

==== Dominican Republic ====
The first normal school in the Dominican Republic was founded in 1875 by Puerto Rican educator and activist Eugenio María de Hostos.

==== Mexico ====
Mexico founded early normal schools, such as the Escuela Normal de Enseñanza Mutua de Oaxaca (1824), the Escuela Normal Mixta de San Luis Potosí (1849), the Normal de Guadalajara (1881), and the Escuela Normal para Profesores de Instrucción Primaria (1887). The Mexican normal school system was nationalized and reorganized in the period after the Mexican Revolution (1910–1920) by the Secretaría de Educación Pública (Secretariat of Public Education) under José Vasconcelos in 1921. Many normal schools were founded in the postrevolutionary period to train the sons and daughters of peasants as teachers. In the 1960s, normal school students joined in the widespread student agitation to create systemic change in Mexico. The 2014 mass kidnapping of normal school students from Ayotzinapa Rural Teachers' College was a major scandal in Mexico.

==== Panama, Colombia and Paraguay ====
In Panama, the Escuela Normal Juan Demóstenes Arosemena was founded in Santiago de Veraguas, Panama, in 1938. In Colombia, normal schools were primarily associated with women's religious schools although in modern times have admitted men, thus forming escuelas normales mixtas (mixed normal schools). In Paraguay, they are known as Instituto de Formación Docente.

=== United States ===
In the United States, "normal school" is a historical term, no longer in use. The former normal schools that survive in the 21st century have become colleges, usually requiring a high school diploma for entrance. Before the American Civil War public schools were elementary schools, and a normal school provided high school-level instruction as part of preparation for teaching the elementary common schools. Many American universities began as normal schools.

== See also ==
- Female seminary
- List of normal schools by country
- Normal, Alabama
- Normal, Illinois
- Normal Station, Memphis
- Normal schools in France

== Bibliography ==
- Bashiruddin, Ayesha. Teacher Development and Teacher Education in Developing Countries (Palgrave Macmillan UK, 2018)
- Hayhoe, Ruth, and Jun Li. "The idea of a normal university in the 21st century." Frontiers of Education in China 5 (2010): 74–103. online
- Heward, Christine. "Men and women and the rise of professional society: the intriguing history of teacher educators" History of Education (1993), 22:1, 11–32, in Great Britain in 19th century. doi:10.1080/0046760930220102
- Lucas, Christopher J. Teacher education in America: Reform agendas for the twenty-first century (Springer, 1997) online
- The World Academy of Sciences. Developing Capacities for Teaching Responsible Science in the MENA Region: Refashioning Scientific Dialogue (2013) Amazon description
