= North Manitou Island =

Island in Michigan

- Location within Michigan

Geography
- Location: Lake Michigan, Sleeping Bear Dunes National Lakeshore
- Coordinates: 45°07′10″N 86°01′01″W
- Area: 22.3 sq mi (58 km^{2})
- Highest elevation: 728 ft (221.9 m)

Administration
- United States
- State: Michigan
- County: Leelanau County
- Township: Leland Township

Demographics
- Population: Uninhabited

North Manitou Island (/ˈmænətu/ MAN-ə-too) is located in Lake Michigan, approximately 12 miles (19 km) west-northwest of Leland, Michigan. It is nearly eight miles long and more than four miles (6 km) wide, with 20 miles (32 km) of shoreline. It has a land area of 57.876 km^{2} (22.346 sq mi) and has no population. The smaller South Manitou Island lies to its southwest.

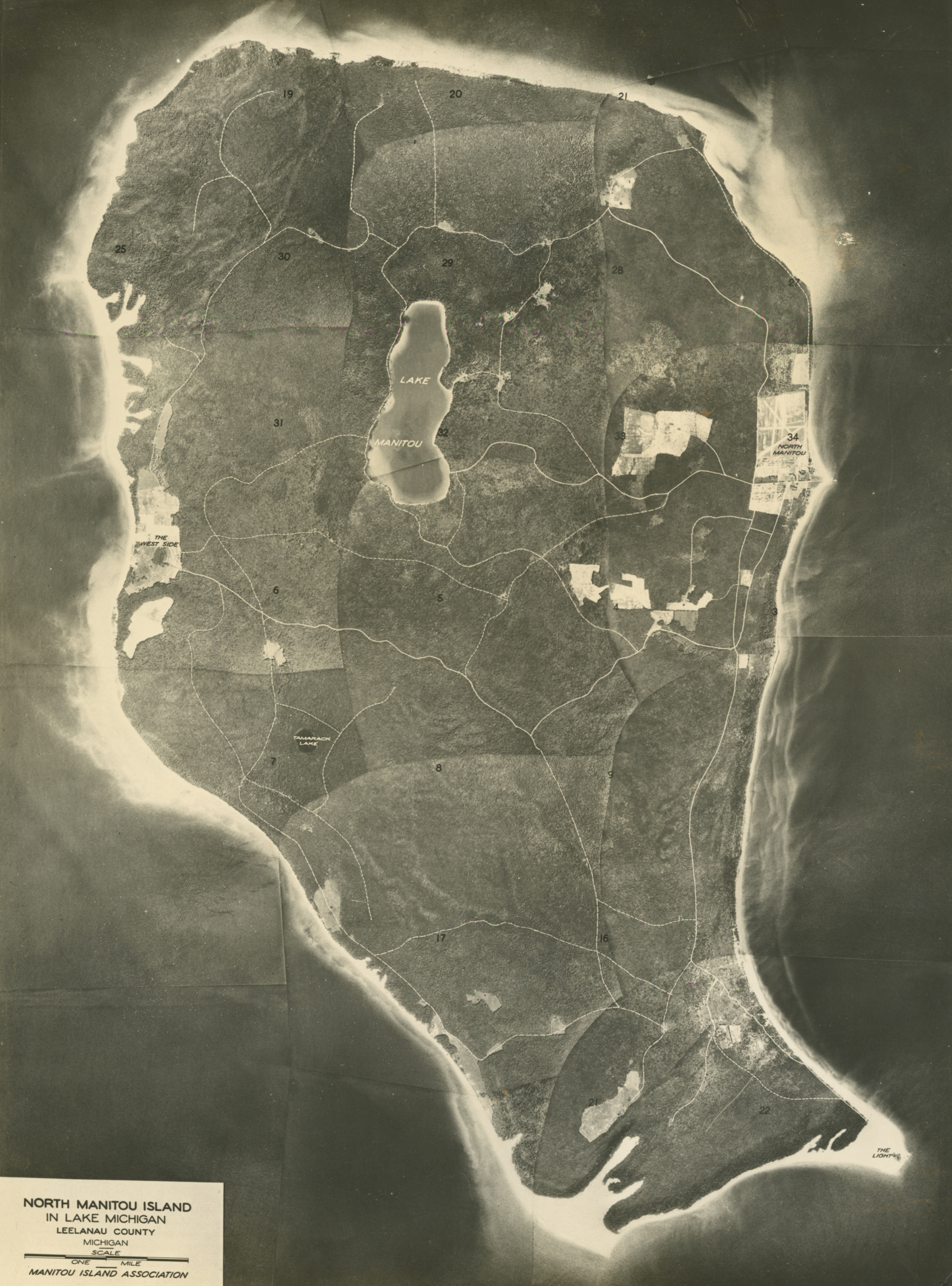
North Manitou Island: Aerial image

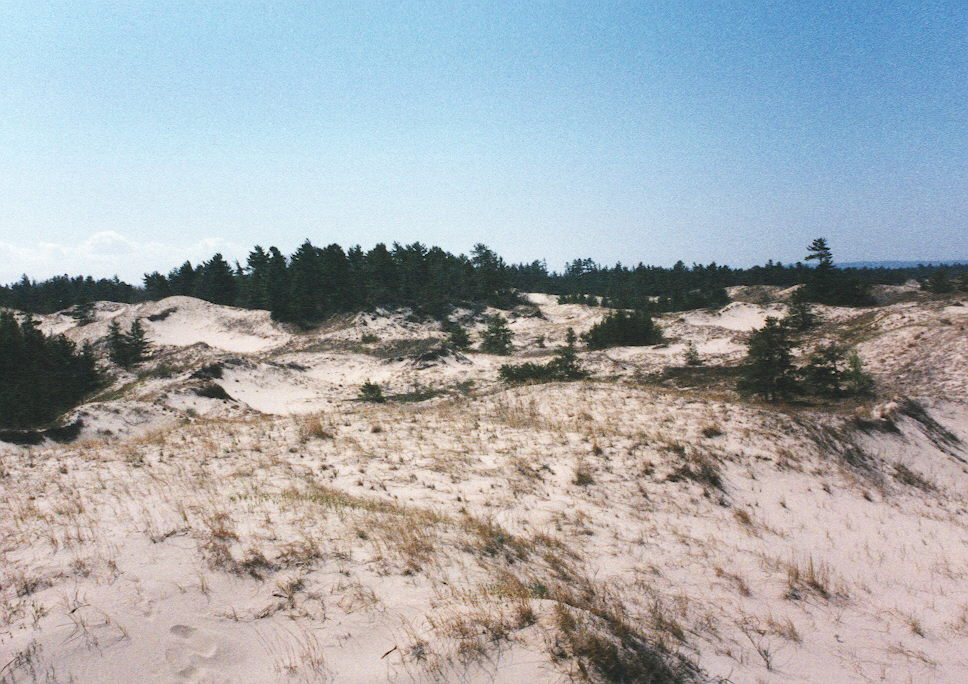
North Manitou Island: southern dunes

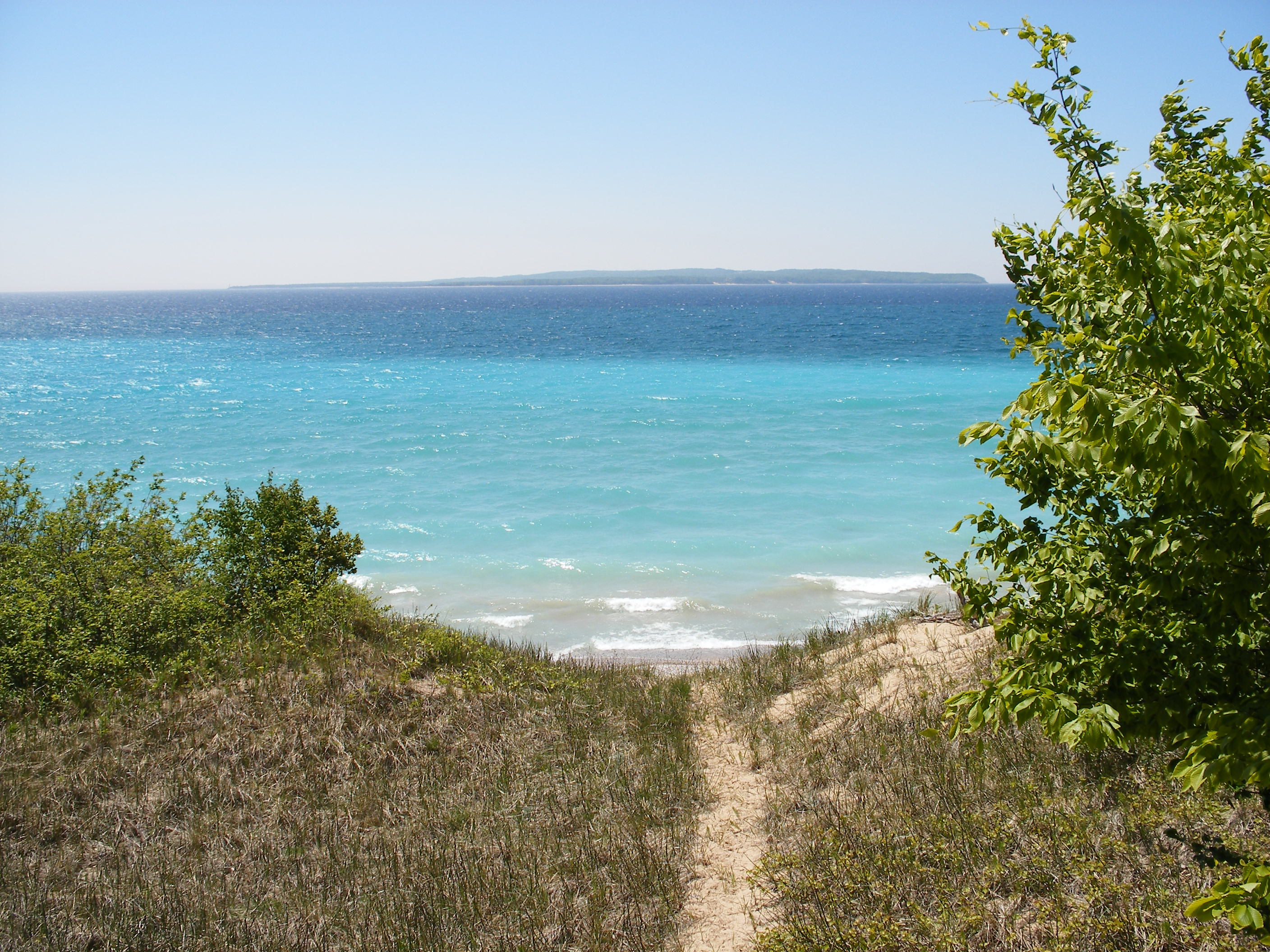
North Manitou Island: southern end of the island looking south

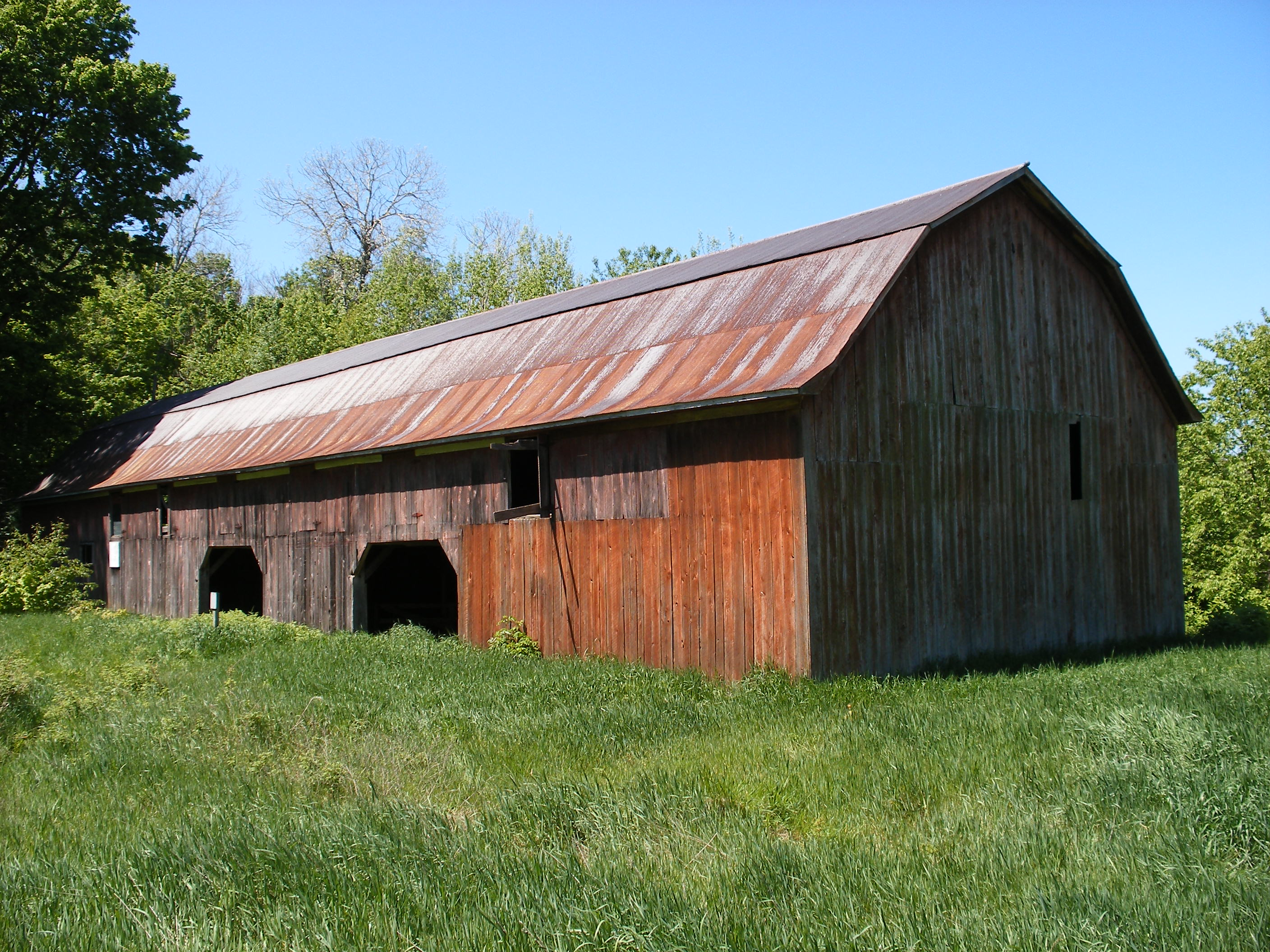
North Manitou Island: Swenson's Barn on the western side of the island

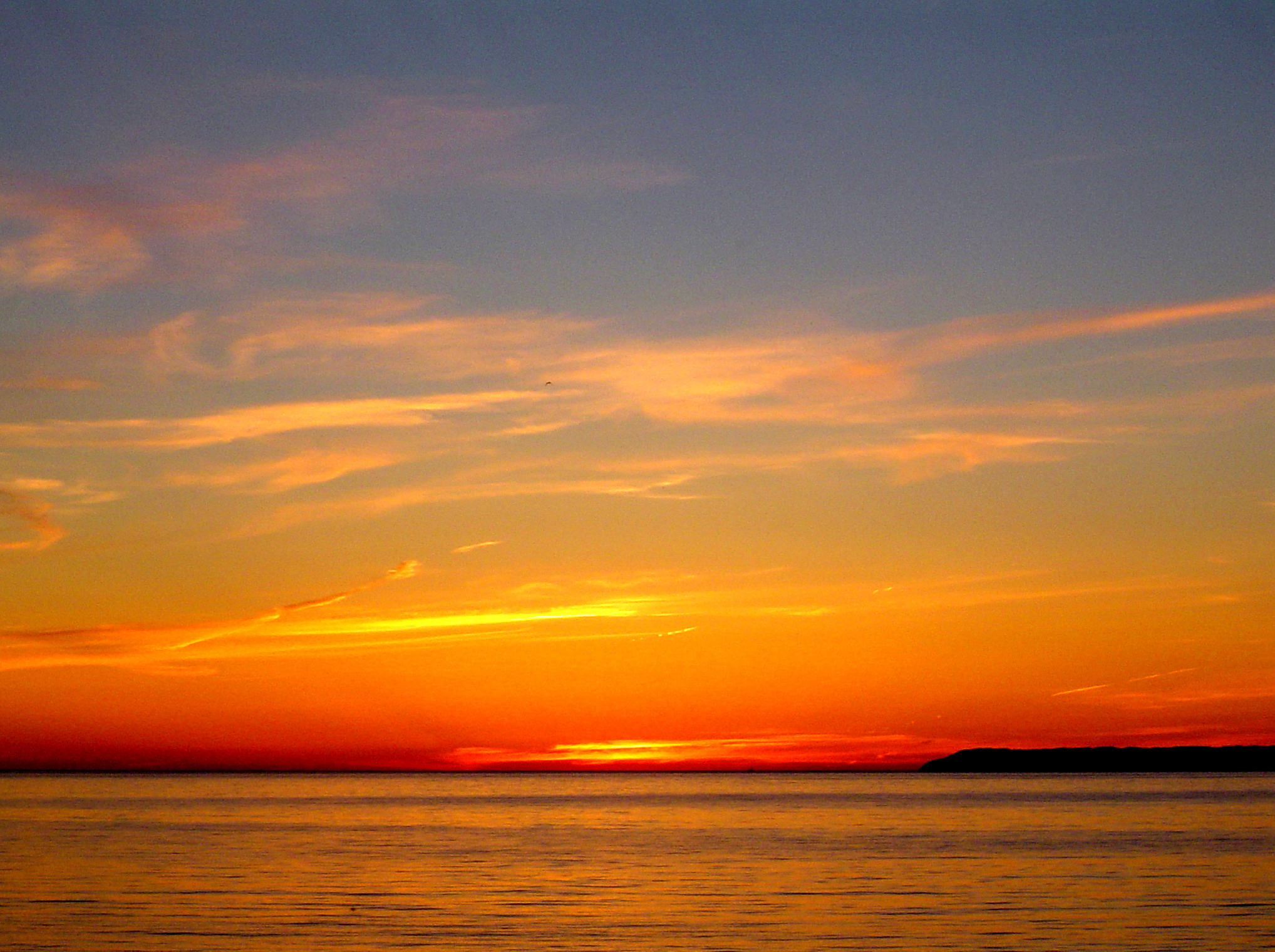
North Manitou Island as seen from Glen Arbor at dusk

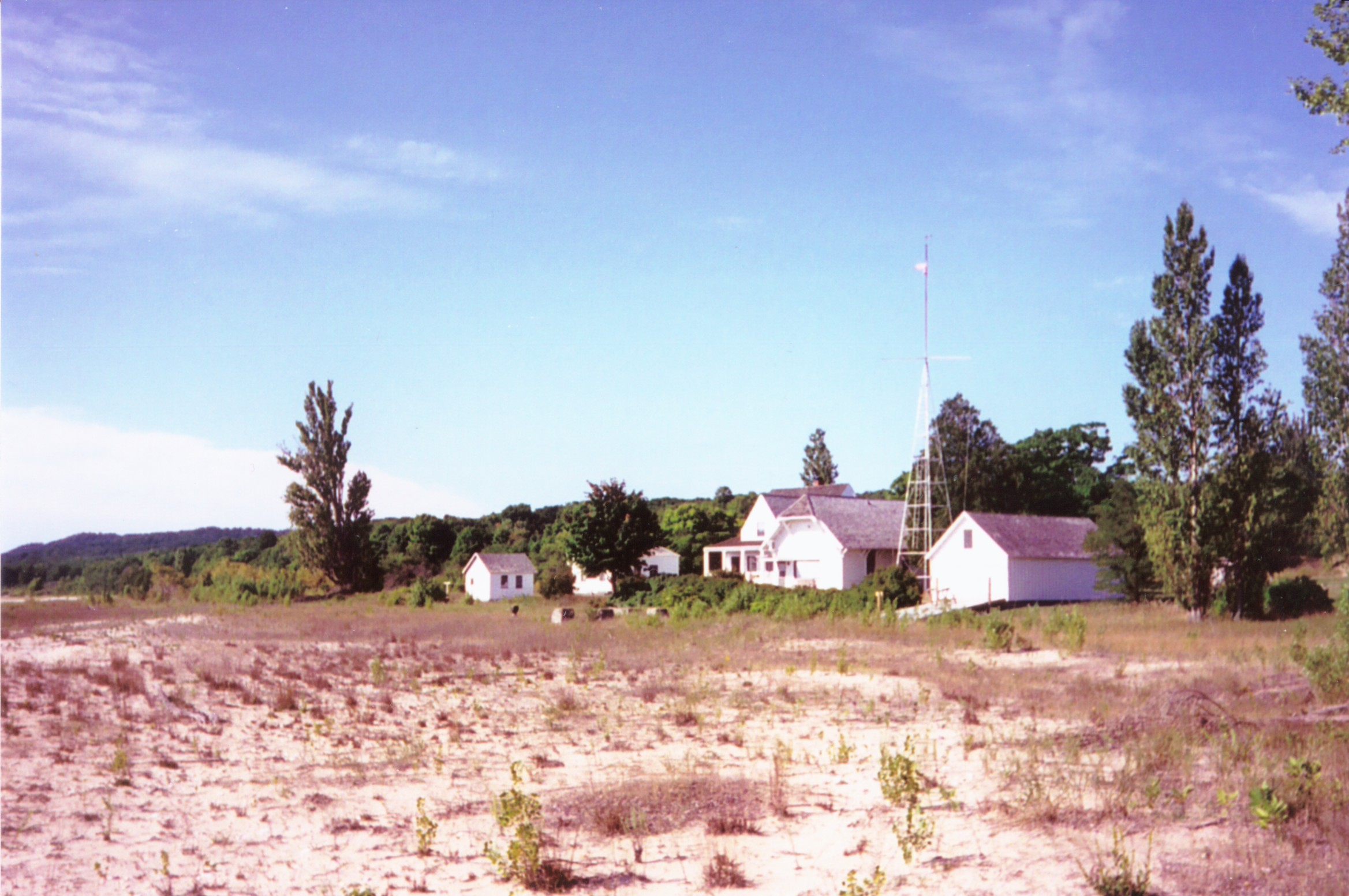
North Manitou Island: Rangers House on the eastern side of the island near the ferry dock

== Description ==
North Manitou Island is shaped like an upside-down teardrop, with the now-forested body of the 'drop' surrounding Lake Manitou, and the tail of the drop narrowing into sandy, exposed Dimmick's Point on the island's southeastern extremity. The ferry dock and ranger station are on the island's central eastern shore, directly east of Lake Manitou.

The island is in Leelanau County and is part of the Sleeping Bear Dunes National Lakeshore, although it is over 6 miles (9.7 km) offshore. Park passes and camping fees are required. The island can be accessed by a ferry service from Leland; private watercraft are permitted with limited docking. No wheeled vehicles are allowed on the island other than those used by the National Park Service or to cart off a dead deer. No campfires are allowed on the island except at public firepits near the ranger station. Similarly there is only one water spigot, and one outhouse, in the same area.

== History ==
=== Before 1900 ===
A legend attributed to the Ojibwe explains the origin of the Manitou Islands and the Sleeping Bear Dunes. Long ago, the bear Mishe Mokwa and her two cubs sought to cross Lake Michigan from the Wisconsin shore to escape a great forest fire. The mother bear made it across, but her twin cubs, although they swam hard behind her, drowned in Lake Michigan. The great spirit covered them with sand to form the two Manitou islands. The mother bear lies and waits forever for her cubs to reach the shore - the Sleeping Bear Dunes. Most archeologists believe early habitation by Native Americans was only temporary due to the island's scarcity of natural resources and the abundance of resources on the mainland. Despite this, there are signs of activity by Native Americans and some of the earliest archeological sites ever found in Michigan are located there. This includes seven sites, mostly on the east side. These sites date back to between 8,000 and 600 BC. Items found include: stone and flint tools, a copper awl, pottery and the remains of a canoe.

The initial European settlements were on the Lake Michigan islands as travel by water was much easier than through the impenetrable virgin forests. Wooding stations supplied the fleet of Great Lakes' wood-burning steamers with cord wood. Nicholas Pickard established an early (1842) wharf on the island's east side.. Piers were constructed on the eastern and (later on the) western sides of the island for the steamers to load cord wood as the Manitou Islands were either the first or last stop from Chicago to Machinaw. While the record is clear that a wood-cutting station was established first on South Manitou, many travelers who have left written accounts did not make it clear which island they visited. Over 150 years later it can be difficult, if not impossible, to tell whether some stories of visiting "the Manitous" refer to North or South. Margaret Fuller's Summer on the Lakes, in 1843, for example, very probably recounts a visit to South Manitou.

=== 20th century ===
After the passing of the wood-burning steamers, there were several more woodcutting eras on the island - for sawn boards and raw logs. Among others there was the Smith & Hull operation on the west side (1906 to 1917), Peter Stormer's east side and north end, a World War II era sawmill (near the site of the old dock in the Settlement), and The Lake Michigan Hardwood Company sawmill and later raw log cutting. Smith & Hull also operated a standard gauge logging railroad, the "Manitou Limited", running northeast 8 miles out of Crescent using two Shay locomotives from July 12, 1909 until 1915 when the timber ran out.

Some island settlers turned to farming, growing apples and cherries; remnants of these orchards can still be seen. From the late 1940s through the 1960s, the William R. Angell Foundation, which owned most of the island, used the imported deer population as an economic resource, hosting hunters. The Foundation artificially supported an abundant deer population with commercial salt blocks and custom feed manufactured by Kellogg Company. The deer pruned the island's forests, giving an open, park-like feeling to even the deepest woods. A 4,000-foot (1,200 m) lighted runway, now a field in "The Settlement" on the eastern side of the island, next to the designated camping grounds and firepits, was used to bring in the hunters.

A summer colony grew on the east side of the island starting in the late 19th century. A group of successful Chicago businessmen built cottages (some of which remain on "Cottage Row"). The National Park Service occupies the old US Life-Saving Station (later the US Coast Guard) grounds near where the Leland boat lands campers. At the south end of the island was a lighthouse, built in 1896, automated in 1932, discontinued in 1938 and destroyed in 1942.

After the foundation sold most of the island to the United States government, the deer population declined due to the lack of artificial feed. The woods have grown up, many clearings are being obliterated; previously open space is rapidly being taken over by the woods. Now, after decades of regrowth, it is hard to spot any deer at all. All buildings built after the 1950s have been slated for demolition or have already been torn down.

Though at various times it was the less populated of the Manitou islands, apple and cherry orchards were planted during its settlement period. Now uninhabited except by the rotating National Park ranger and maintenance crews assigned there, the homesteads and most of the buildings of the island's former settlers lie in varying states of ruin. Various buildings are shored up during the summer months. There is a cemetery in the southeast of the island where some of the island’s former inhabitants are buried.

== Today ==
The Manitou islands are surrounded by over 50 known shipwrecks; a few of these are popular (and protected) diving spots.

The island has a system of trails, the remnants of the island's unpaved roads. On the west side of the island one may still walk the "old grade" - the roadbed of the Smith & Hull logging railroad. Wilderness camping is permitted throughout the island, and there are several designated camping sites near the ranger station at the dock. Filtered water is available at the ranger station, with limited natural inland water sources. There is one sizeable inland lake, Lake Manitou, suitable for fishing, and another, Tamarack Lake, which is now essentially a cedar swamp. The island is flanked by dunes on its northwest and southwest sides.

Island mammals include coyote, beaver, white-tailed deer, and eastern chipmunk. The raccoon population died out due to disease shortly before 2002. Numerous songbirds and waterfowl can be seen; of particular note is the endangered piping plover, which nests here. Human disturbance of the nesting area (near Dimmick’s Point) is disastrous to successful reproduction. Therefore, the Dimmick’s Point area is closed to hikers from May 1 through August 15 of each year. Bald eagles are commonly seen, especially during spring and early summer nesting season. Garter snakes are abundant on the island. There is an annual deer hunting season to limit the size of the population.

== Climate ==
North Manitou Island

Climate chart (precipitation, max. and min. temperature)
| J | F | M | A | M | J | J | A | S | O | N | D |
| 79 −4 −6 | 61 −7 −19 | 60 −3 −7 | 126 1 −2 | 101 4 2 | 86 11 10 | 94 16 13 | 59 18 16 | 124 17 16 | 173 9 9 | 124 7 5 | 78 5 0 |
- █ Average max. and min. temperatures in °C
- █ Precipitation totals in mm
Imperial conversion
| J | F | M | A | M | J | J | A | S | O | N | D |
| 3.1 25 21 | 2.4 19 −2 | 2.4 27 19 | 5 34 28 | 4 39 36 | 3.4 52 50 | 3.7 61 55 | 2.3 64 61 | 4.9 63 61 | 6.8 48 48 | 4.9 45 41 | 3.1 41 32 |
- █ Average max. and min. temperatures in °F
- █ Precipitation totals in inches
