= Caleb Stetson (minister) =

American minister and Transcendentalist (1793–1870)

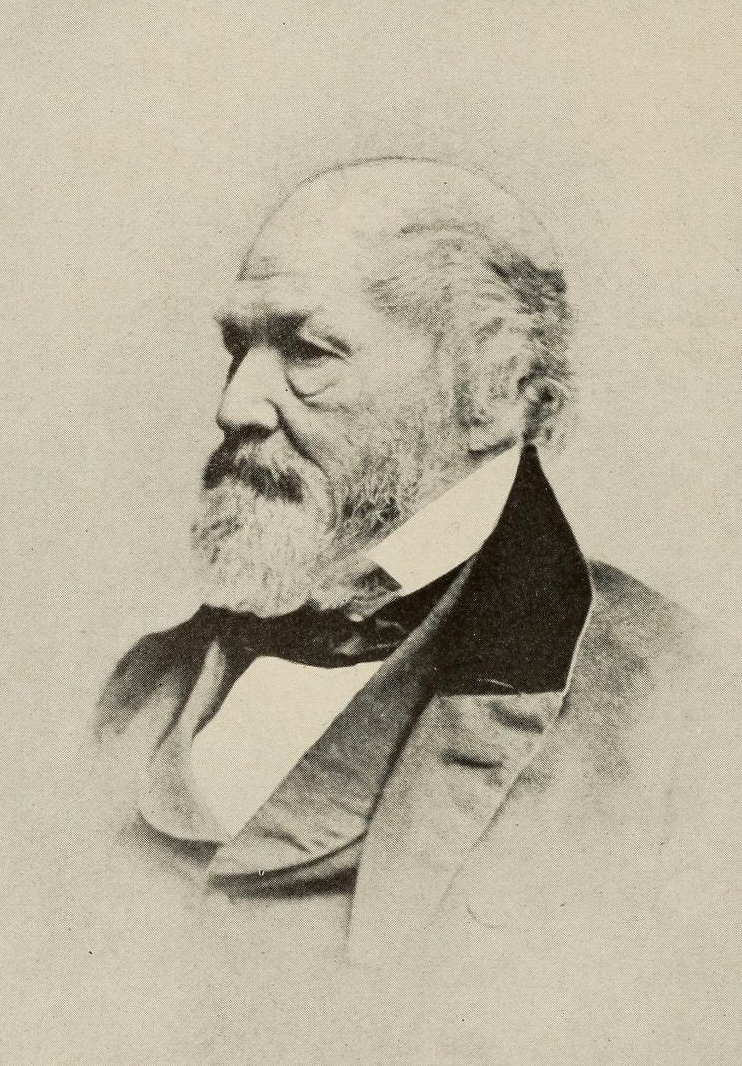
- Born: July 12, 1793; Kingston, Massachusetts, US
- Died: May 17, 1870 (aged 76); Lexington, Massachusetts, US
- Education: Harvard College; Harvard Divinity School
- Occupation: Minister
- Movement: Transcendentalism, Unitarianism

Caleb Stetson (July 12, 1793 – May 17, 1870) was an American minister and member of the Transcendental Club, together with Transcendentalism's other followers. He was pastor of the Unitarian First Parish Church of Medford in Massachusetts for 21 years.

== Early life and education ==
Stetson was born in Kingston, Massachusetts, on July 12, 1793, one of eleven children of Thomas and Abigail (Brewster) Stetson. He graduated from Harvard College in 1822 and served as headmaster of Lexington Academy in Lexington, Massachusetts, from 1822 to 1825. He graduated from Harvard Divinity School in 1827.

== Ministry and Transcendentalism ==
Invited to preach on a temporary basis at the Unitarian First Parish Church at Medford, Massachusetts, Stetson was immediately invited by the congregation to become the permanent pastor, offered a one-time bonus of one thousand dollars. On February 28, 1827, he was duly ordained as pastor of the church. He led the church until resigning from office on March 24, 1848. He occasionally substituted for Theodore Parker in West Roxbury. A staunch abolitionist, he rebuked what he termed the "barbarism" of Southern slaveholders and denounced the "imprisonment of our fellow-citizens, for no crime but their color" in a printed sermon dated April 7, 1842. Notably, he spoke in front of the Adelphic Union, an anti-slavery association founded by Black Bostonians. On August 24, 1834, Stetson preached a notable sermon at the First Church in Medford condemning the anti-Roman Catholic Ursuline Convent riots, denouncing the rioters for their violent and lawless behavior and rebuking the authorities' failure to bring the rioters to justice.

Stetson joined the Transcendental Club in 1837 and hosted it at least twice at his home in Medford, Massachusetts. He became close friends with fellow Unitarian ministers Convers Francis and Frederic Henry Hedge, who founded the Transcendental Club (originally called Hedge's Club). The first documented occasion when he hosted was on May 20, 1838, at which meeting the club members discussed the question "Is Mysticism an element of Christianity?" Stetson hosted the club again on May 20, 1840, when members discussed "the doctrine and rites of Worship, and the indications of the new Church and ritual of the present time." He attended a total of eighteen Transcendental Club meetings, fewer only than Amos Bronson Alcott, George Ripley, Ralph Waldo Emerson, and Frederic Henry Hedge. In his letters, Stetson praised abolitionist politician Charles Sumner, calling him representative "of all that is noble in New England." He praised Margaret Fuller's travelogue Summer on the Lakes in a review in Christian Examiner in 1844.

After resigning from his ministry in Medford in 1848, possibly under pressure from a congregation that disapproved of his abolitionism, Stetson became minister of the Second Unitarian Church in Scituate that same year. His paternal ancestor, Cornet Stetson, had helped found the church in 1645. After a decade or so in ministry in Scituate, he moved back to Lexington, where he lived with his family in the Buckman Tavern. He served on the Lexington School Committee in 1860. He continued to give sermons occasionally and spoke at the services held in Lexington to mark Abraham Lincoln's funeral in 1865. He died in Lexington on May 17, 1870.

== Personal life ==
Stetson married Julia Ann Meriam of Lexington in 1827. Julia died on August 24, 1889. The couple had seven children, all born in Medford: Frederick Dudley, Thomas Meriam, Julia, Osgood, Edward Gray, Abbie Chandler, and Ellen Winslow.

== Printed sermons ==
- Stetson, Caleb (1843). The kingdom of God: A sermon preached at the ordination of John Pierpont Jr. as pastor of the Second Congregational Church in Lynn, October 11, 1843. Lynn, MA: Washingtonian Press.
- Stetson, Caleb (1842). A discourse on the state of the country, delivered in the First Church in Medford, on the Annual Fast Day, April 7th, 1842. Boston: Munroe & Company.
- Stetson, Caleb (1840). Two discourses preached before the first Congregational society in Medford; one upon leaving the old Church and one at the Dedication of the New. Boston: Printed by I. R. Butts.
- Stetson, Caleb (1834). A discourse on the duty of sustaining the laws occasioned by the burning of the Ursuline Convent: delivered at the First Church in Medford, Sunday, August 24, 1834. Boston: Hilliard, Gray.
- Stetson, Caleb (1825). An oration delivered at Lexington, on the fourth of July, 1825. Cambridge, MA: Printed by Hilliard and Metcalf.
