= North Manitou Island Light =

Lighthouse in Michigan, United States

- Location: Lake Michigan
- Coordinates: 45.063°N 85.964°W

Light
- First lit: 1899

North Manitou Island Light was a Lake Michigan lighthouse and fog signal complex at Dimmick's Point on North Manitou Island in Leelanau County within the U.S. state of Michigan. In operation from 1899 until 1935, the lighthouse helped to mark the Manitou Passage. The lighthouse complex was superseded by the North Manitou Shoal Light in 1935 and was privatized in 1938. While fragments of the light station complex remained as of 2017, the lighthouse tower succumbed to the effects of erosion on its exposed site in 1942. The lightkeeper's dwelling house followed it into oblivion in the early 1970s.

== Specifications ==
The now-vanished lighthouse complex boasted a fourth-order Fresnel lens and an oil-fired foghorn.
