= Unitarian Universalist Church of Medford and the Osgood House =

Historic church in Massachusetts, United States

- Unitarian Universalist Church of Medford and The Osgood House
- U.S. National Register of Historic Places
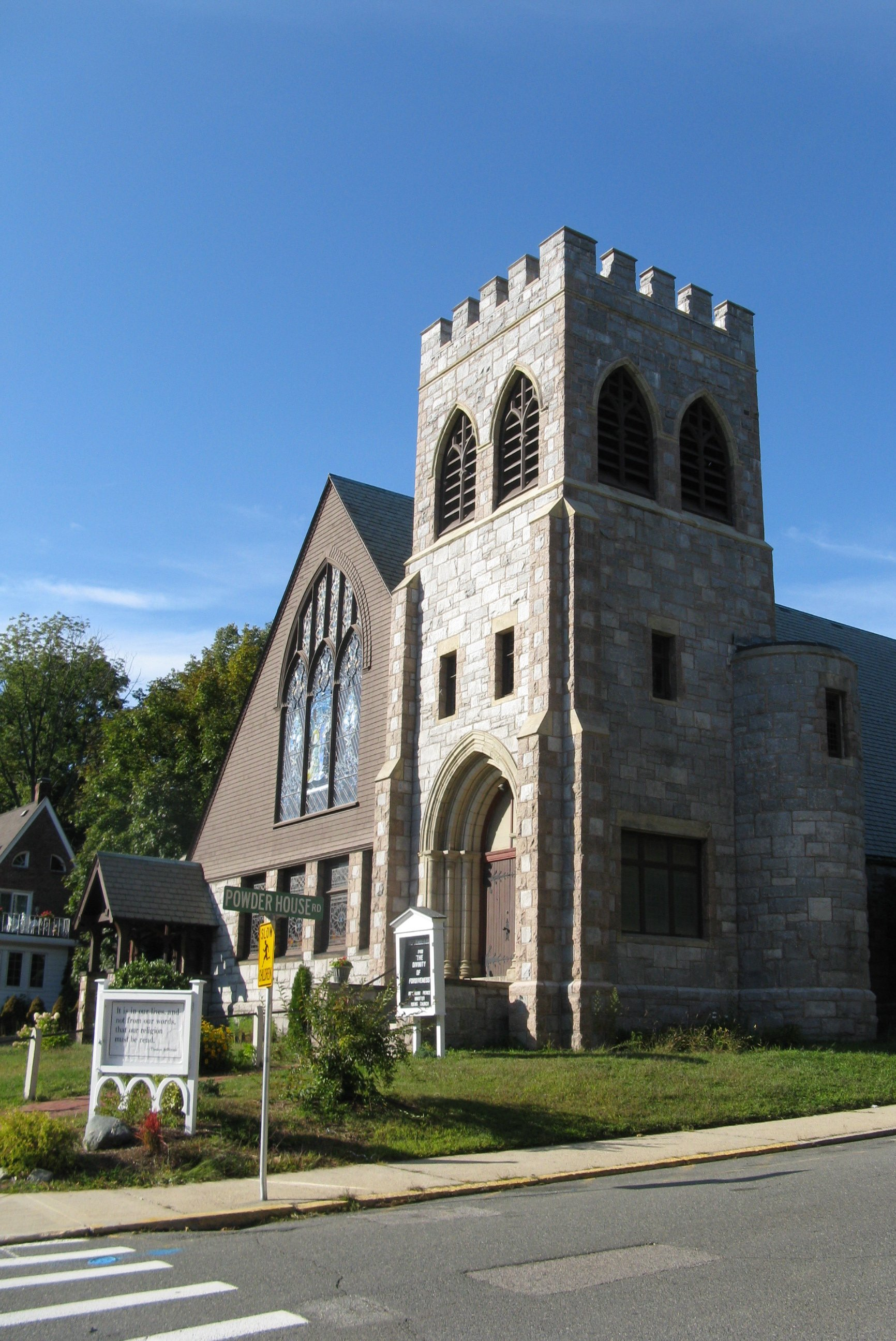

- Location within Massachusetts Location within the United States
- Location: 141 and 147 High St., Medford, Massachusetts
- Coordinates: 42°25′13″N 71°6′55″W
- Area: 1 acre (0.40 ha)
- Built: 1894
- Architect: Brown, J. Merrill; Dodge Bros.
- Architectural style: Gothic, Georgian
- NRHP reference No.: 75000281
- Added to NRHP: April 21, 1975

The Unitarian Universalist Church of Medford and The Osgood House are a historic Unitarian Universalist church building and parsonage house at 141 and 147 High Street in Medford, Massachusetts.

== History ==
The congregation was founded in 1690 as a Puritan parish church that was an official branch of the Massachusetts state church. In 1696 the first meeting house was constructed. In the early 1820s the congregation split and was restructured with the 'orthodox' Trinitarian members leaving to form a separate congregation. The current and fifth building of the congregation was constructed in 1894 and added to the National Register of Historic Places in 1975.

The Rev. William Ellery Channing gave his first sermon at 1st Parish Medford, on August 8, 1802 "Silver and gold have I none, but such I give to you." The Rev. Thomas Starr King did his student ministry under Hosea Ballou II at 1st Universalist before Ballou moved to become the first president of Tufts College in 1852.

The First Universalist Church and the Hillside Universalist consolidated with the First Parish Church (Unitarian) in 1961 to form The Unitarian Universalist Church of Medford (or UU Medford) a member congregation of the Unitarian Universalist Association, and has been a Welcoming Congregation since 1996.

== Architecture ==
The church, built in 1893-94, is one of Medford's finest examples of Late Gothic Revival architecture. It was designed by J. Merrill Brown, a Boston architect who had worked in the practices of H.H. Richardson and Peabody and Stearns. The builders were the Dodge Brothers, a regionally prominent building firm specializing in religious buildings. The former parsonage, now housing other church facilities, was built in 1785 for the Reverend David Osgood, and is a fine example of Federal period architecture.

== Famous members ==
- George Luther Stearns
- Lydia Maria Child
- Fannie Farmer
- Rev. John Pierpont
- James Pierpont
- Robert D. Richardson
- Samuel C. Lawrence
- Gov. John Brooks
- Rev. Hosea Ballou II
- Rev. Clarence Skinner

== List of ministers ==
=== First Parish (Unitarian) ===
- Rev. Aaron Porter 1713-22,
- Rev. Ebenezer Turell 1724-78,
- Rev David Osgood 1747-1822,
- Rev. Andrew Bigelow 1823-27,
- Rev. Caleb Stetson 1827-48,
- Rev. John Pierpont 1849-56,
- Rev. Theo Tibbettes 1857-60,
- Rev. Edward Towne 1861-67,
- Rev. Henry DeLong 1869-1914,
- Rev. Louis Dethlefs 1914-36,
- Rev. Robert Richardson 1936-51,
- Rev. Charles Engvall 1951-61,

=== First Universalist Church ===
- Rev Winslow Wright 1833-35,
- Rev. Joseph Banfield 1835-38,
- Rev. Hosea Ballou 2nd 1838-53,
- Rev Gustavas Maxham 1854-58,
- Rev. Cyrus Lomnard 1859-61,
- Rev. Benjamin Davis 1861-67,
- Rev. Russell Ambler 1869-73,
- Rev. J. H. Farnsworth 1874-75,
- Rev. William. Haskell 1876-78,
- Rev. Richard Eddy* 1878-79,
- Rev. Daniel Libby 1880-82,
- Rev. Russell Ambler 1882-86,
- Rev. John Reardon 1886-88,
- Rev. Charles Leonard* 1888-89,
- Rev. W. Woodbridge 1889-94,
- Rev William Dearborn 1894-98,
- Rev. Clarence Eaton 99-1910,
- Rev. Edward Barney 1911-20,
- Rev. Hendirk Vossema 1921-30,
- Rev. Robert A. Nunn 1930-32,
- Rev. Fred Miller 1931-36,
- Rev. William Abbe 1936-41,
- Rev. Roger F. Etz 1941-50,
- Rev. Eugene Ashton 1950-52,
- Rev. John Ratcliff 1950-52,
- Rev. Grant Haskell 1952-58,
- Rev. Eugene Adams 1958-61,

=== Hillside Universalist ===
- Prof. George Harmon 1896-97,
- Rev. B.F. Eaton 1897-98,
- Rev. Theo. Fischer 1899-1906,
- Rev. Charles. Temple 1906-09,
- Rev. Pliny Allen 1909-11,
- Dr. I.P. Coddington 1911-12,
- Rev. Arthur Wilson 1913-14,
- Rev. Otis Alvord 1915-17,
- Rev Clarence Skinner 1917-20,
- Rev. T.W. Horsfield 1920-22,
- Rev. Charles Clark 1922-26,
- Rev. John Paige 1927-30,
- Rev. Phillip Mayer 1930-32,
- Rev. Emily Mayer 1932-33,
- Rev. Donald Lester 1933-35,
- Rev. Andrew Torsleff 1935-50,
- Rev. Alexander Meek 1950-52,
- Fr. William Wrenn 1952-53,
- Rev. James Hunt 1952-53,
- Rev. John Dahlquist 1953-56,
- Rev. Bruno Visco 1956-58,
- Mr. Leo Dantana 1958-61,

=== The Unitarian Universalist Church of Medford ===
- Rev. Frank Ricker 1962-67,
- Rev. Paul Osborn 1967-69,
- Rev. Dean Starr (interim),
- Rev. Eugene Adams 1970-87,
- Rev. Scott Jones 1987-92,
- Rev. Dorothy Emerson 1992-98,
- Rev. Doris Hunter 1998-99 (interim),
- Rev. Deborah Mero 1999-2000 (interim),
- Rev. Henry I. Peirce 2000-2011,
- Rev. Susan Milnor 2012-2014 (interim),
- Rev. Tess Baumberger 2014–2016
- Rev. Marta Valentín, 2017-2019
- Rev. Bruce Taylor, 2020-

== See also ==
- National Register of Historic Places listings in Medford, Massachusetts
- National Register of Historic Places listings in Middlesex County, Massachusetts
