= Postgraduate Diploma in Education =

One-year qualification for bachelor's degree holders

The Postgraduate Diploma in Education (PGDE), also known as a Graduate Diploma of Education (GradDipEd), is a one-year postgraduate course in several countries including Tanzania, Australia, Ghana, New Zealand, Republic of Ireland, Scotland, Hong Kong, Singapore and Zimbabwe for existing bachelor's degree holders leading to become a qualified teacher.

The qualification is normally taught at a university or other higher education institution, though much of the course time is spent on placements in local schools. For example, in the Hong Kong programmes, most schools will have lesson time for about 20 weeks, and another 14 weeks (usually taken in 6 weeks for the first semester and 8 weeks for the second semester) for placements.

In Ireland, the former Higher Diploma in Education (H.Dip.Ed.) was renamed as the PGDE from 2007 onwards. It has since been superseded by the Professional Master of Education (P.M.E.).

The Postgraduate Certificate in Education (PGCE) is the equivalent of the PGDE in England, Wales and Northern Ireland and historically in Scotland. Some universities, for instance Durham University award PGDE on successful completion of 120 University Credit Units (UCU) of a Master of Arts Education course (i.e., completing two years). The PGCE is awarded after 60UCUs.

== See also ==
- Professional Graduate Diploma in Education
- Postgraduate diploma
- Postgraduate training in education (disambiguation)
