= Postgraduate training in education =

Postgraduate training in education may refer to:

- Postgraduate Certificate in Education (United Kingdom)
- Postgraduate Diploma in Education
- Postgraduate education
- Postgraduate diploma
- School of education
- Teacher education
