= Lexington Academy (Lexington, Massachusetts) =

Former school building in Lexington, Massachusetts, U.S.

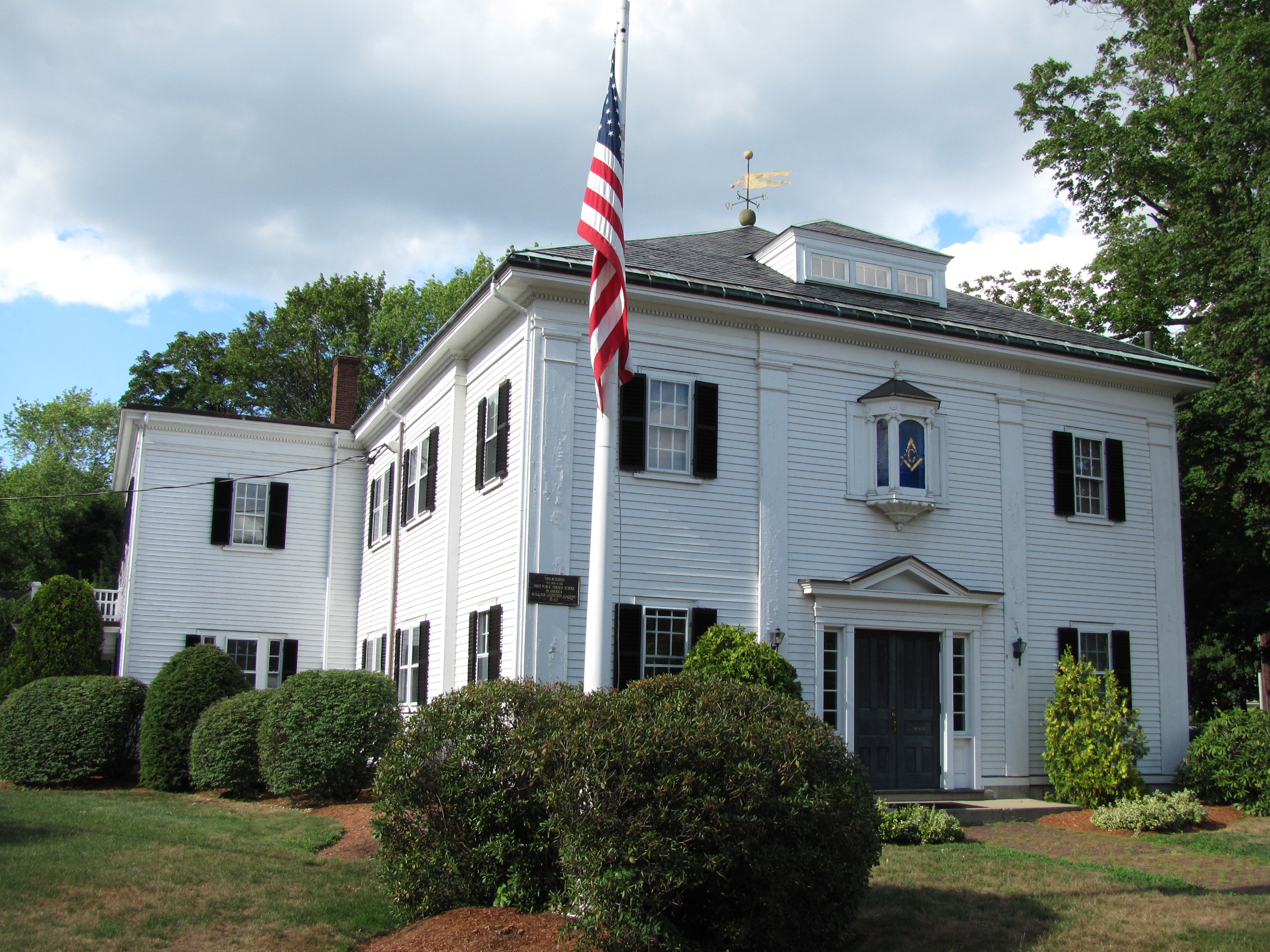
- Pictured in 2010

Location
- 1 Hancock Street; Lexington, Massachusetts 02420; United States
- Coordinates: 42°27′02″N 71°13′49″W

Information
- Established: 1820 (206 years ago)

Lexington Academy was a school in Lexington, Massachusetts. Established in 1820, its former building, at 1 Hancock Street, is now occupied by the Simon W. Robinson Masonic Lodge. The building overlooks Lexington Common from the northeast.

In 1839, after its time as an academy, the building became Lexington Normal School, the first state-supported normal school (or teacher's college) in the United States. Five years later, the school moved to Newton, eventually becoming Framingham State College.
